= Poles in the United Kingdom =

Polacy w Wielkiej Brytanii
- Distribution by regional area at the 2011 census

Total population
- Polish-born residents in the United Kingdom: 840,769 – 1.3% (2021/22 Census) (Note: Does not include ethnic Poles born in the United Kingdom or those who have Polish ancestry); England: 718,251– 1.3% (2021); Scotland: 75,351 – 1.4% (2022); Wales: 24,832 – 0.8% (2021); Northern Ireland: 22,335 – 1.2% (2021); Polish citizens/passports held: 760,146 (England and Wales only, 2021)

Regions with significant populations
- Regions: Greater London; South East of England; East of England; East Midlands; Towns and Cities: Greater London (Ealing; Hounslow; Brent; Barnet; Haringey); Southampton; North Northamptonshire (Corby, Kettering, Wellingborough); Birmingham; Leeds; Kingston Upon Hull; Northampton; Leicester; Slough; Coventry; Luton; Wakefield; Nottingham; Peterborough; Bournemouth; Bristol

Languages
- British English, Polish

Religion
- Predominantly Roman Catholic

Related ethnic groups
- Polish diaspora, Polish American, Polish Brazilian, Polish Argentine, Polish Canadian, Polish Irish, Polish Maltese, Polish Swedes, Polish Norwegians, Polish Icelanders, Polish Dutch, Polish German

British Poles, alternatively known as Polish British people or Polish Britons, are ethnic Poles who are citizens of the United Kingdom. The term includes people born in the UK who are of Polish descent and Polish-born people who reside in the UK. There are approximately 682,000 people born in Poland residing in the UK. Since the late 20th century, they have become one of the largest ethnic minorities in the country alongside Irish, Indians, Pakistanis, Bangladeshis, Germans, and Chinese. The Polish language is the second-most spoken language in England and the third-most spoken in the UK after English and Welsh. About 1% of the UK population speaks Polish (2013). The Polish population in the UK has increased more than tenfold since 2001.

Exchanges between the two countries date to the Middle Ages, when the Kingdom of England and the Polish–Lithuanian Commonwealth were linked by trade and diplomacy. A notable 16th-century Polish resident in England was John Laski, a Protestant convert who influenced the course of the English Reformation and helped in establishing the Church of England. Following the 18th-century dismemberment of the Commonwealth in three successive partitions by Poland's neighbours, the trickle of Polish immigrants to Britain increased in the aftermath of two 19th-century uprisings (1831 and 1863) that forced much of Poland's social and political elite into exile. London became a haven for the burgeoning ideas of Polish socialism as a solution for regaining independence as it sought international support for the forthcoming Polish uprising. A number of Polish exiles fought in the Crimean War on the British side. In the late 19th century governments mounted pogroms against Polish Jews in the Russian (Congress Poland) and Austrian sectors of partitioned Poland (Galicia). Many Polish Jews fled their partitioned homeland, and most emigrated to the United States, but some settled in British cities, especially London, Manchester, Leeds and Kingston upon Hull.

The number of Poles in Britain increased during the Second World War. Most of the Polish people who came to the United Kingdom at that time came as part of military units reconstituted outside Poland after the German-Soviet invasion of Poland in September 1939, which marked the beginning of World War II. On 3 September 1939, Britain and France, which were allied with Poland, declared war on Germany. Poland moved its government abroad, first to France and, after its fall in May 1940, to London. The Poles contributed greatly to the Allied war effort; Polish naval units were the first Polish forces to integrate with the Royal Navy under the Peking Plan. Polish pilots played a conspicuous role in the Battle of Britain and the Polish army formed in Britain later participated in the Allied invasion of Nazi-occupied France. The great majority of Polish military veterans were stranded in Britain after the UK's Prime Minister, Winston Churchill, and the USA's president, first Franklin Delano Roosevelt, and then Harry Truman, allowed the Soviet Union to impose communist control on Poland at the conferences in Tehran and Yalta after the war. This particularly concerned Polish soldiers from eastern areas, which were no longer part of Poland as a result of border changes due to the Potsdam Agreement. The Polish government-in-exile, though denied majority international recognition after 1945, remained at its post in London until it formally dissolved in 1991, after a democratically elected president had taken office in Warsaw.

The European Union's 2004 enlargement and the UK Government's decision to allow immigration from the new accession states, encouraged Polish people to move to Britain rather than to Germany. Additionally, the Polish diaspora in Britain includes descendants of the nearly 200,000 Polish people who had originally settled in Britain after the Second World War. About one-fifth had moved to settle in other parts of the British Empire.

== History ==
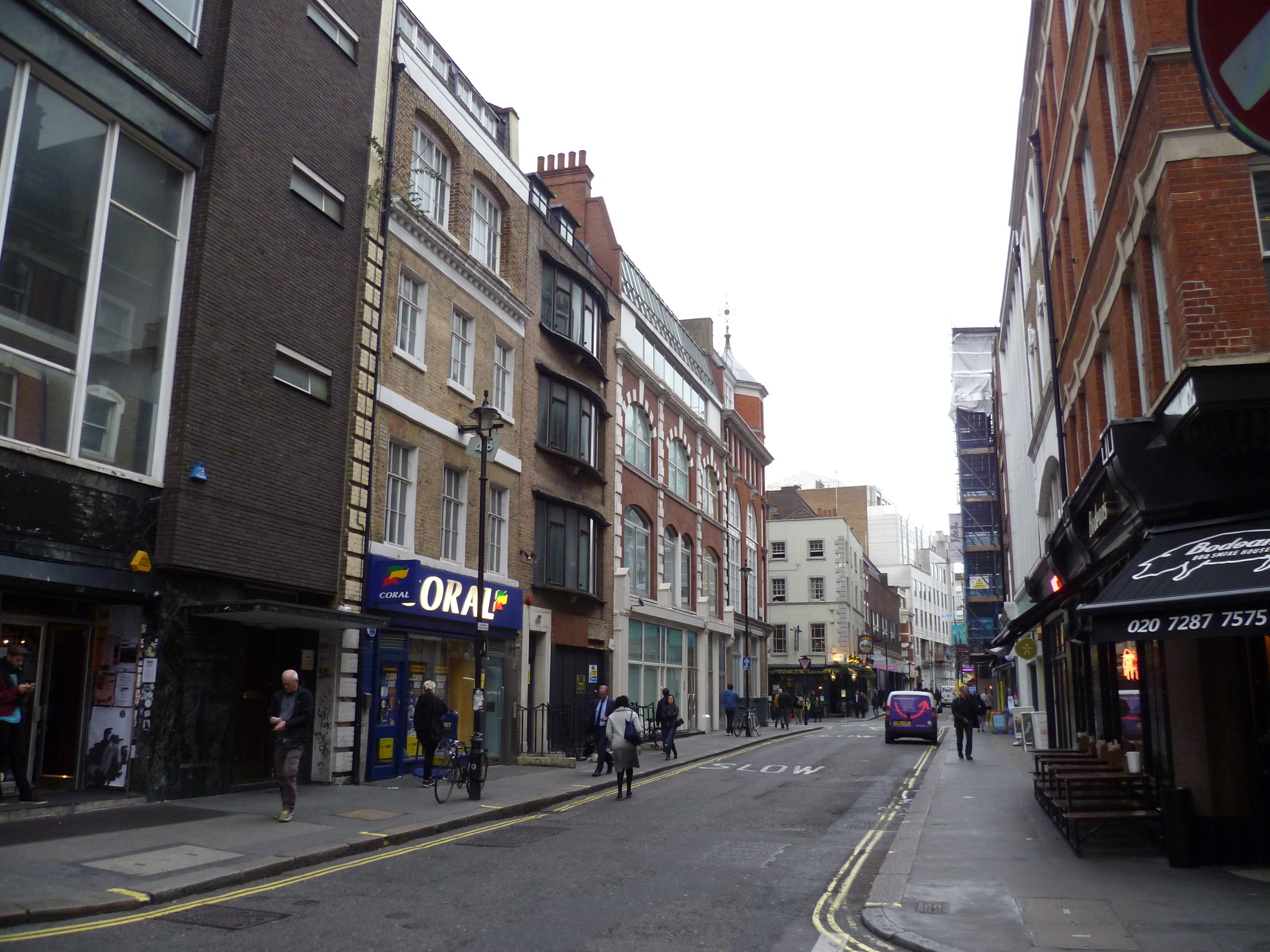
Poland Street in London's Soho district (2015)

A Polish cleric named John Laski (1499–1560), nephew of Jan Łaski (1456–1531), converted to Calvinism while in Basel, Switzerland, where he became an associate of Archbishop Cranmer. After moving to London, in 1550 he was superintendent of the Strangers' Church of London and had some influence on ecclesiastical affairs in the reign of Edward VI. Laski also spent some years working on the establishment of the Church of England. Shortly before his death, he was recalled to Poland's royal court.

In the 16th century, when most grain imports to the British Isles came from Poland, Polish merchants and diplomats regularly travelled there, usually on the Eastland Company trade route from Gdańsk to London. Shakespeare mentions Polish people in his play Hamlet (e.g. "sledded polack"), which Israel Gollancz attributes to influence of the book, De optimo senatore (The Accomplished Senator), by Laurentius Grimaldius Goslicius (Wawrzyniec Grzymała Goślicki, a Polish bishop and noble). Gollancz further speculated that the book inspired Shakespeare to create the character Polonius, which is Latin for "Polish".

After Poland's King John III, at the head of a coalition of European armies, defeated the invading Ottoman forces at the 1683 Ottoman siege of Vienna, a pub in London's Soho district was named "The King of Poland" in his honour, and soon afterwards the street on which it stands was named Poland Street (and continues to be so to this day). In the 18th century, Polish Protestants settled around Poland Street as religious refugees fleeing the Counter-Reformation in Poland.

=== 18th century ===
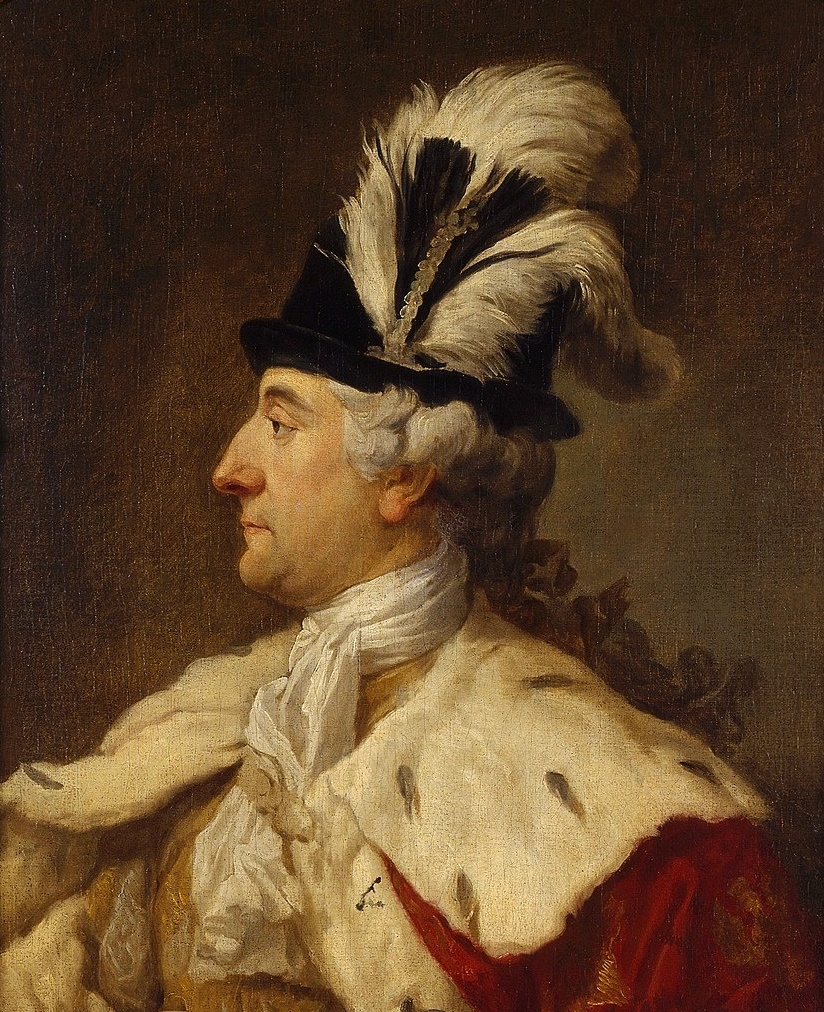
Stanislaus II Augustus, c. 1780 by Marcello Bacciarelli

As a young man of the Enlightenment, and already befriended by a Welsh diplomat, Sir Charles Hanbury Williams, the young Stanislaus Poniatowski, future and last King of Poland, stayed in Britain for some months during 1754. On this trip he also came to know Charles Yorke, the Lord Chancellor of Great Britain.

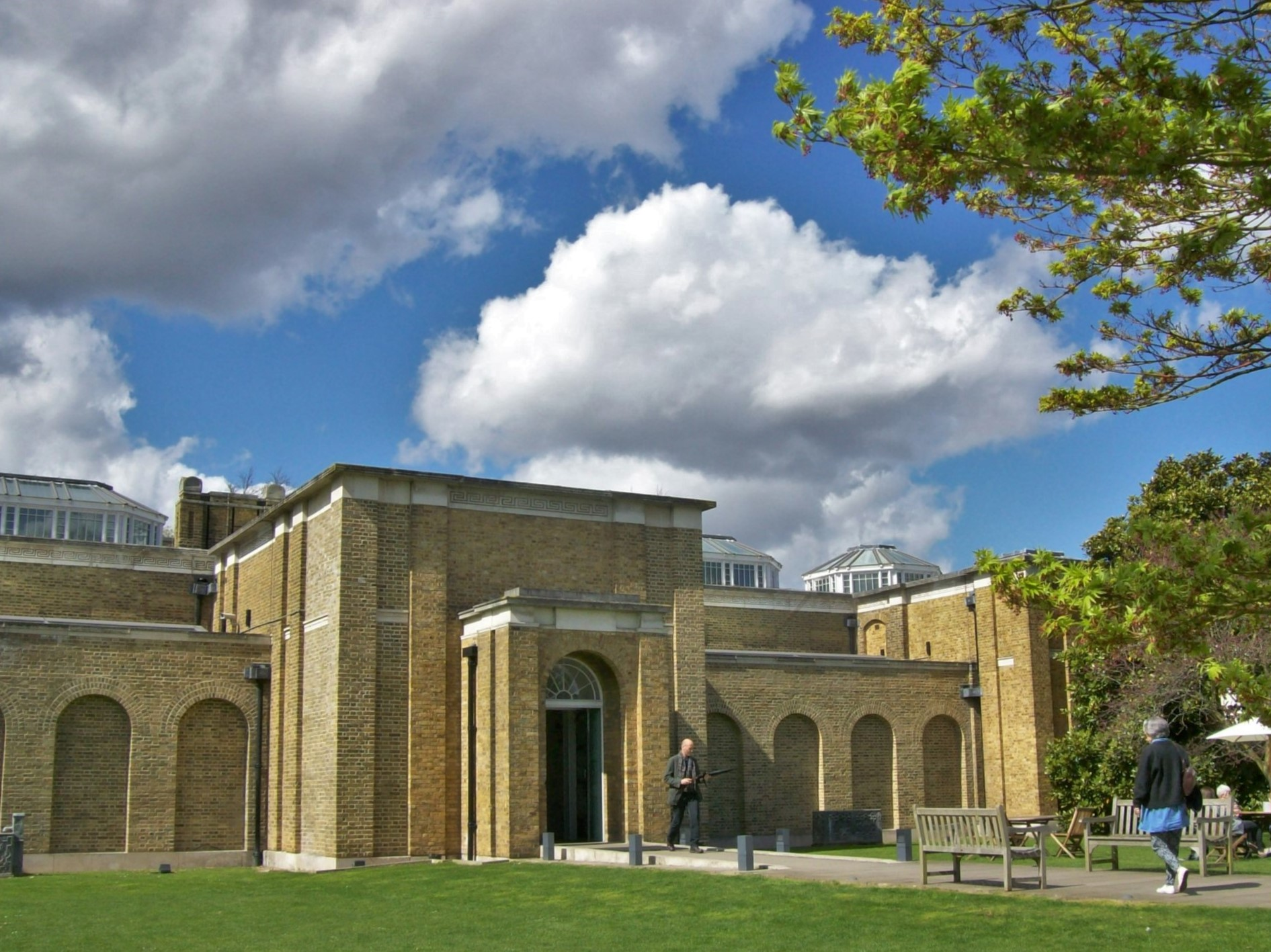
Dulwich Picture Gallery, where the Polish art collection still remains

In 1788, during the closing years of Stanislaus' reign, after the first Partition of Poland in 1772, the Polish called a special assembly, known to history as the Four Years Diet or "Great Sejm" whose great achievement was to be the Constitution of 3 May 1791. In that period Poland sought support from the Kingdom of Great Britain in its negotiations with Prussia in an effort to stave off further threats from Russia and from its own plotting magnates.

In 1790, King Stanislaus Augustus sent Michał Kleofas Ogiński (also a composer and mentor to Frederic Chopin) on an embassy to London to meet with Prime Minister William Pitt the Younger. The British were prepared, along with the Dutch, to propose a favourable commercial treaty for Polish goods, especially flax, if Poland ceded the cities of Gdańsk and Toruń to the Prussians. This condition was unacceptable to Poland.

Stanislaus Augustus also commissioned the London art dealership of Bourgeois and Desenfans to assemble a collection of Old Master paintings for Poland to encourage arts in the Commonwealth. The dealers fulfilled their commission, but five years later Poland as a state ceased to exist following the third and final Partition. The art collection destined for Poland became the nucleus of the Dulwich Picture Gallery in South London.

=== 19th century ===
In the 19th century, Polish-British relations took on a cultural dimension, with musical tours in the United Kingdom by virtuosos and composers including Maria Szymanowska, Frederic Chopin, Maria Kalergis and Henryk Wieniawski.

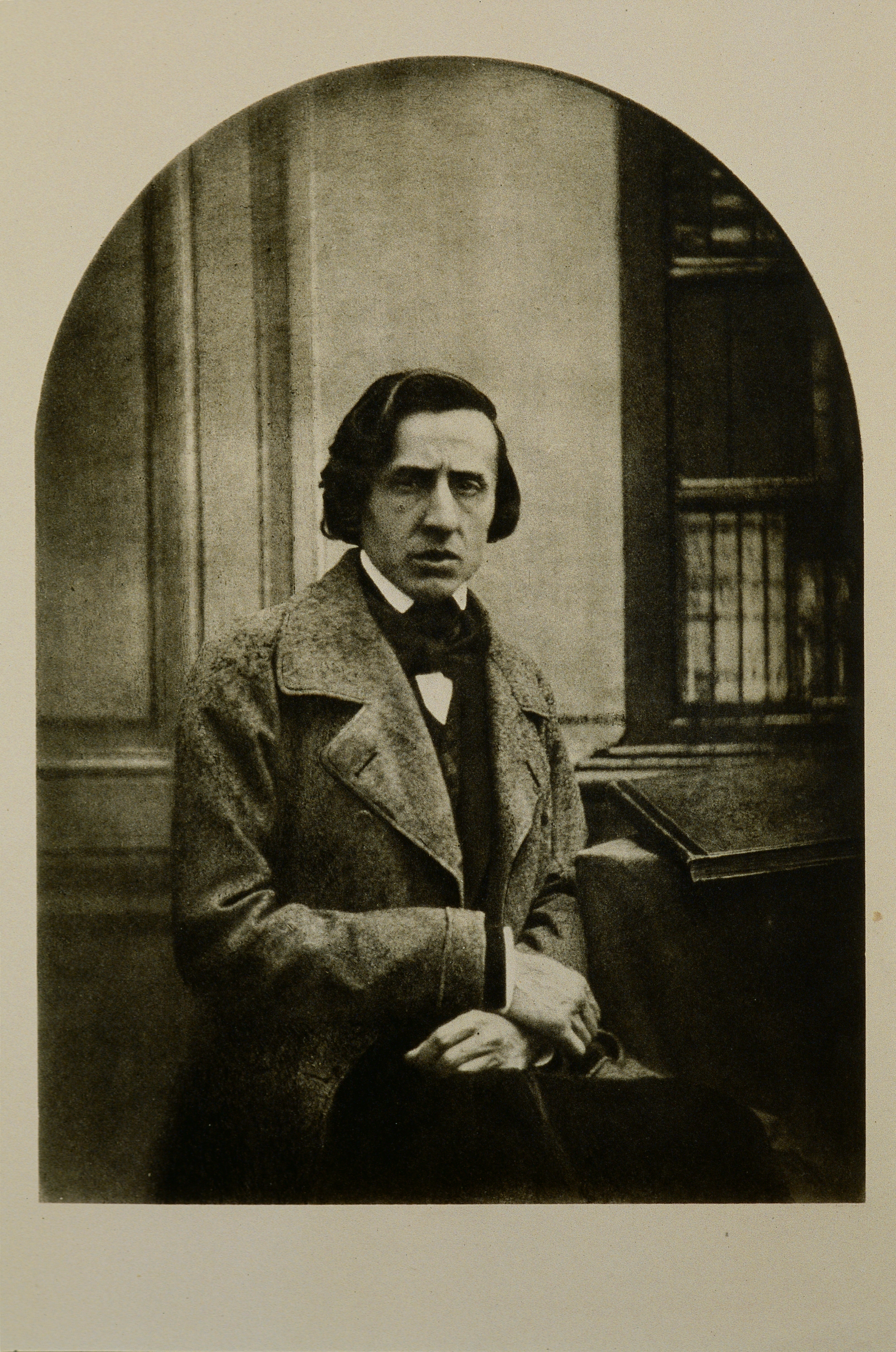
Chopin, soon to die, gave concerts in Britain in 1848.

During the November 1830 Uprising against the Russian Empire, British military equipment and armaments were sent to Poland, facilitated by the presence of Leon Łubieński studying at Edinburgh University at the time and the swift despatch to Britain of his uncle, Józef, to secure the shipment. After the collapse of the rebellion in 1831, many Polish exiles sought sanctuary in Britain. One of them was the veteran and inventor, Edward Jełowicki, who took out a patent in London on his Steam turbine. The fall of Warsaw and the arrival of the Poles on British shores prompted poet Thomas Campbell with others to create in 1832 a Literary Association of the Friends of Poland, with the aim of keeping British public opinion informed of Poland's plight. The Association had several regional centres; one of its meetings was addressed by the Polish statesman, Count Adam Jerzy Czartoryski. Czartoryski's permanent representative at the Court of St James's was General Count Władysław Stanisław Zamoyski, who later led a division in the Crimean War on the British side against Russia. Zamoyski's adjutant was another Polish exile, an officer in the 5th Sultan's Cossacks—a Polish cavalry division—Colonel Stanisław Julian Ostroróg. The last official Polish envoy to Britain was the statesman, writer, and futurologist, Julian Ursyn Niemcewicz (1758–1841).

The 1848 revolutions in Europe gave impetus to a number of Polish socialist activists to settle in London and establish the "Gromada Londyn" between 1855 and 1861. They sought support from other European activists who were in the city forming the First Internationale. The social connections formed between Poland and Britain encouraged the influential Polish Łubieński family to forge further trade links between the two countries. The anglophile banker, Henryk Łubieński prompted his business associate and Polish "King of Zinc", Piotr Steinkeller, to open The London Zinc Works off Wenlock Road in London's Hoxton in 1837, with a view to exporting zinc sheeting to India. Moreover, two of Łubieński's grandsons were sent to board at the Catholic Ushaw College in Durham. Other relatives married into the old recusant Grimshaw and Bodenham de la Barre family of Rotherwas. Subsequently, the Redemptorist Venerable Fr. Bernard Łubieński (1846–1933) spent many years as a Catholic missionary in England. The Polish Catholic Mission in England and Wales began its pastoral work for Polish émigrés in 1853 with church services in Soho's Sutton Street and with the arrival of Sr. Franciszka Siedliska and two other nuns to start a Polish school.

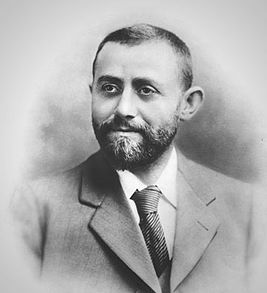
Michael Marks (Polish: Michał Marks), co-founder of Marks & Spencer

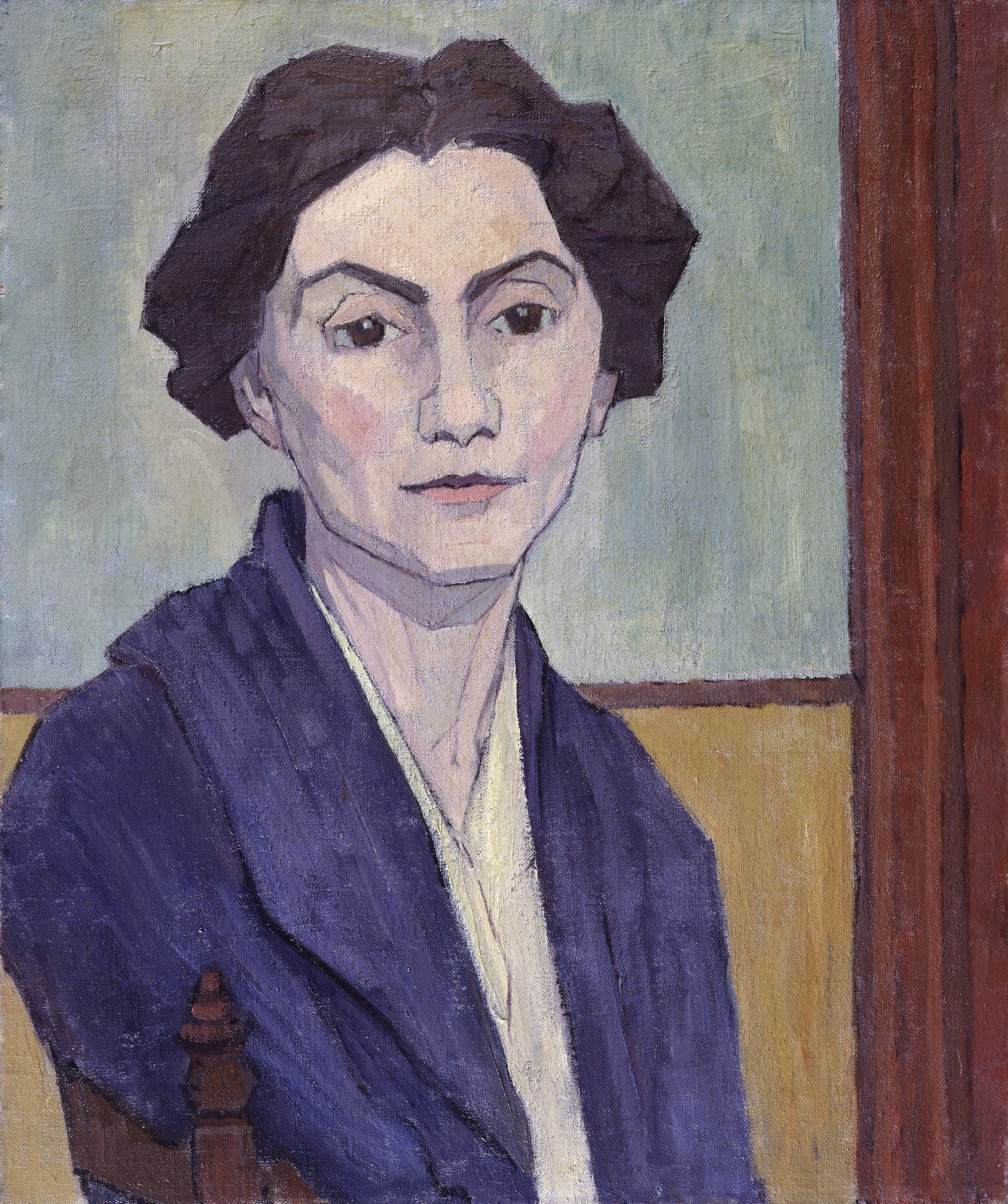
Stanisława de Karłowska by husband, Robert Bevan

The next Polish uprising, the January 1863 Uprising, led to a further influx of Polish political exiles to Britain. Among them were people like Stanisław Julian Ostroróg, Crimean veteran and photographer to Queen Victoria, Walery Wróblewski and the only notable Polish anarchist and follower of Bakunin, Walery Mroczkowski, member of the First Internationale and opponent of Marxist ideology. Polish Jews also fled due to the intensifying anti-Semitic pogroms and better economic opportunities. Among the notable Polish Jews who came to Britain were Henry Lowenfeld theatrical impresario and brewer, Michael Marks (co-founder of Marks & Spencer), Morris Wartski (founder of Wartski antique dealers) and the family of Jack Cohen, the founder of Tesco.

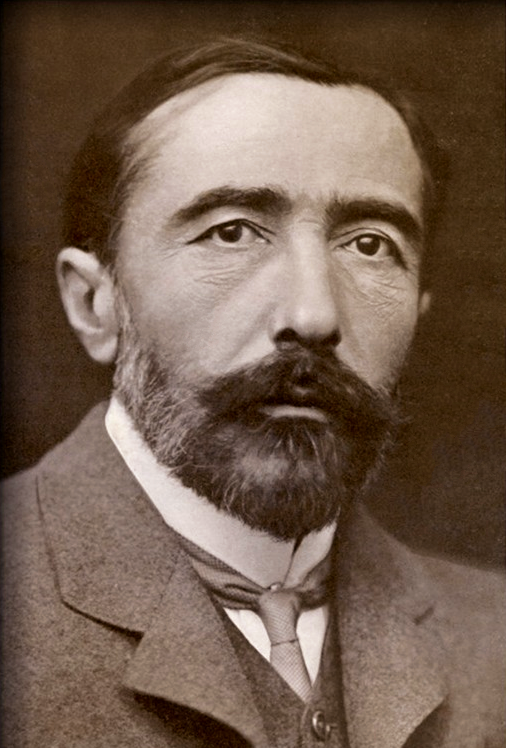
Joseph Conrad (Józef Korzeniowski), renowned English-language novelist

Perhaps the most famous Polish person to settle in Britain at the end of the 19th century, having gained British citizenship in 1886, was the seafarer turned early modernist novelist, Józef Korzeniowski, better known by his pen name, Joseph Conrad. He was the highly influential author of such works as Almayer's Folly, The Nigger of the 'Narcissus', Heart of Darkness, Lord Jim, Nostromo, The Secret Agent, The Duel, Under Western Eyes and Victory, many of which have been turned into films. Another artist to settle in London (1898) was the modernist painter, Stanisława de Karłowska (1876–1952), who married the English artist, Robert Bevan. She helped to found The London Group.

At the end of the 19th-century, along with Zurich and Vienna, London had become one of the centres of Polish political activism, especially of the left. Józef Piłsudski stayed in Leytonstone after his escape from St-Petersburg. The political review, "Przedświt" ("Pre-Dawn") was published in Whitechapel for several years, notably under the editorship of Leon Wasilewski 1898–1903, later to become the first foreign minister of a newly independent Poland in 1918.

Both before and after the First World War, a few Poles settled in London – following the Russian Revolution of 1905 and then in the war, those released from London's prisoner-of-war camps for Germans and Austrians in the Alexandra Palace and at Feltham. In 1910 a sixteen-year old youth from Warsaw settled in London for the sake of his art: he was to be a future ballet master, Stanislas Idzikowski. Polish people living in the Austrian and German partitions had been obliged to serve in their respective national forces and were unable to return.

The resurgence of an independent Poland in 1918, briefly complicated by the Polish–Soviet War from 1918 to 1920, enabled the country to rapidly reorganise its polity, develop its economy, and resume its place in international forums. One of the Polish delegates at the Paris Peace Conference, was a London-based émigré, Count Leon Ostroróg. This two-decade period of advance was disrupted in September 1939 by a coordinated German and Soviet invasion that marked the beginning of World War II.

=== Second World War ===
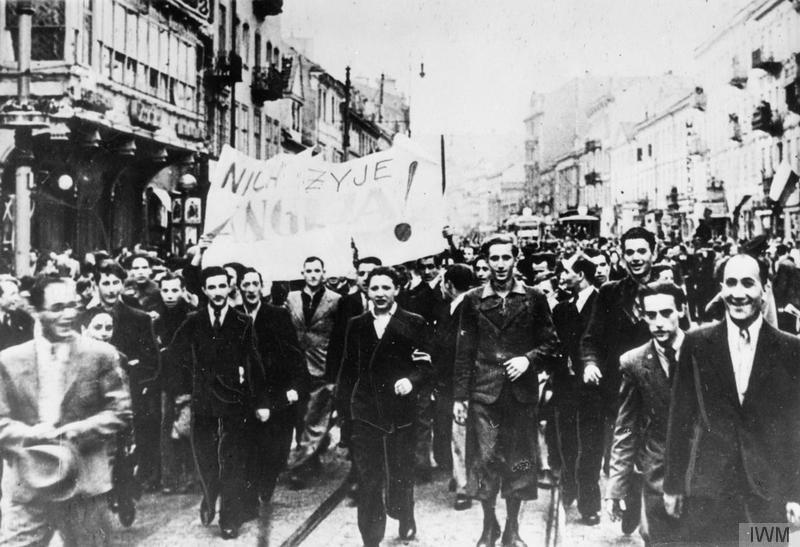
Poles marching in Warsaw, after Britain declared war on Germany, during invasion of Poland. Banner reads "Long Live England".

It was the Polish contribution to the Allied war effort in the United Kingdom that led to the establishment of the postwar Polish community in Britain. During the Second World War, most of the Poles arrived as military or political émigrés as a result of the combined German-Soviet occupation of Poland.

As the invasion of Poland progressed throughout September 1939, the Polish government evacuated into Romania and from there to France. Based at first in Paris, it moved to Angers until June 1940, when France capitulated to the Germans. With the Fall of France, the Polish Government-in-Exile relocated to London, along with a first wave of at least 20,000 soldiers and airmen in 1940. It was recognized by all the Allied governments. Politically, it was a coalition of the Polish Peasant Party, the Polish Socialist Party, the Labour Party, and the National Party. Although these parties maintained only a vestigial existence in the circumstances of the war, the tasks of the Government-in-Exile were immense, requiring open lines of communication with, and control of, the Polish Underground State in situ and the Polish Underground Army in occupied Poland, and the maintenance of international diplomatic relations for the organization of regular Polish military forces in Allied states.

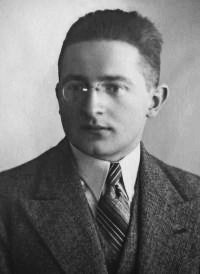
Mathematician Marian Rejewski ca. 1932, when he first "broke" German Enigma cipher

On 4 July 1943 the Polish Prime Minister-in-Exile, General Wladyslaw Sikorski, who was also Commander-in-Chief of the Polish Armed Forces in the West, died in an air crash off Gibraltar as he was returning to Britain from an inspection tour of Polish forces in the Mediterranean theatre. Until the Germans' April 1943 discovery of mass graves of 28,000 executed Polish military reserve officers at Katyn, near Smolensk in Russia, Sikorski had wished to work with the Soviets. After Hitler's invasion of the Soviet Union in June 1941, the Soviets' importance to the Western alliance had grown while British support for Polish aspirations had begun to decline. As the war progressed, Polish plans to more completely incorporate Poland's underground Home Army into the broader strategy of the Western allies—including contingency plans to move Polish Air Force fighter squadrons, and the Polish Parachute Brigade, to Poland—foundered on British and American reluctance to antagonise a vital Soviet ally hostile to Polish autonomy; on the distance from British-controlled bases to occupied Poland, which lay at the extreme flying range of available aircraft; and on the frittering away of the Polish Parachute Brigade in Operation Market Garden.

One of the most important Polish contributions to Allied victory had actually begun in late 1932, nearly seven years before the outbreak of war when the mathematician-cryptologist Marian Rejewski, with limited aid from French military intelligence, constructed a double of the sight-unseen German Enigma cipher machine used by the German civil and military authorities. Five weeks before the outbreak of war, in late July 1939, Rejewski and his fellow cryptologists, Henryk Zygalski and Jerzy Rozycki had disclosed to French and British intelligence in Warsaw the techniques and technologies they had developed for "breaking" German Enigma ciphers. Poland's Biuro Szyfrów (Cipher Bureau, operated by the Polish General Staff) gave the British and French an Enigma double, each. This enabled British cryptographers at Bletchley Park to develop their "Ultra" operation. At war's end, General Dwight Eisenhower characterized Ultra as having been "decisive" to Allied victory. Former Bletchley Park cryptologist Gordon Welchman wrote: "Ultra would never have got off the ground if we had not learned from the Polish, in the nick of time, details both of the German military... the Enigma machine, and of the operating procedures that were in use [by the Germans]."

=== Polish Navy ===
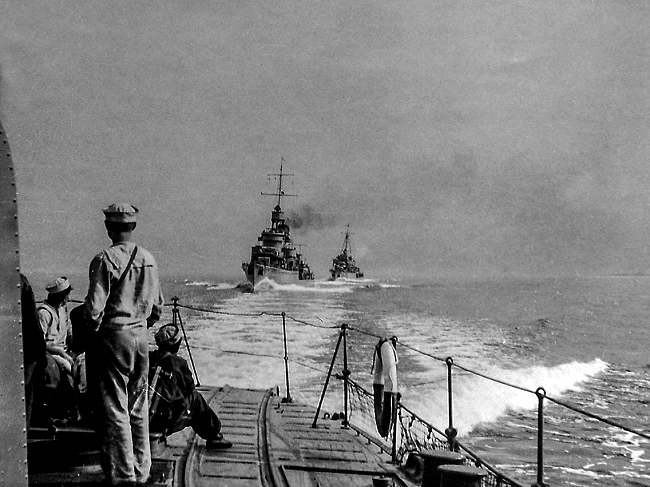
Operation Peking, the evacuation of Polish navy destroyers from Poland to Britain in late August 1939

The first Polish military branch to transfer substantial personnel and equipment to the United Kingdom was the Polish Navy. Shortly before the outbreak of hostilities, the Polish government ordered three destroyers, for their protection and in anticipation of joint operations with the Royal Navy, to sail for Great Britain (Operation Peking). Two submarines also sailed there, the Orzeł (Eagle) arriving unannounced in Scotland after a daring breakout from the Baltic Sea following its illegal internment in Estonia.

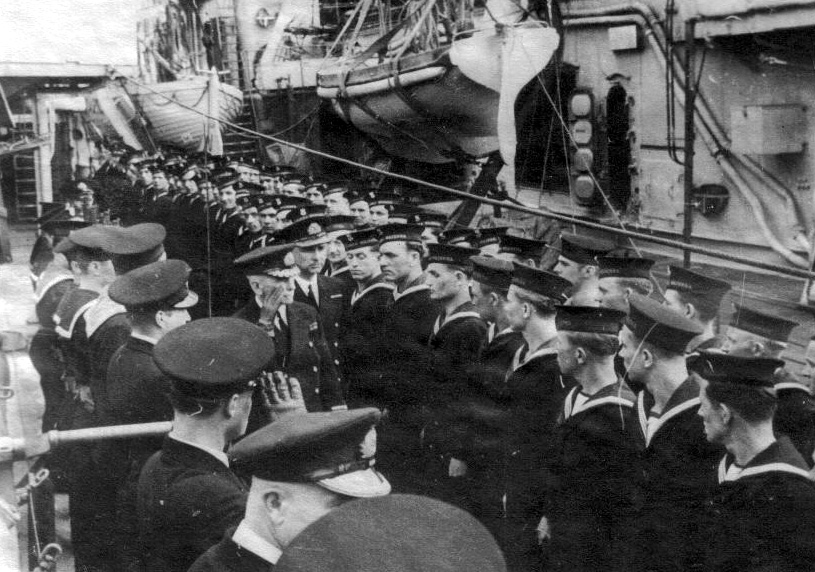
ORP Piorun officers and men on return to Plymouth after fighting the Bismarck

Polish Navy personnel to come under Royal Navy command comprised 1,400 officers and 4,750 sailors. By chance, Poland's only two ocean-going commercial liners, MS Piłsudski and MS Batory were also on the high seas on 1 September 1939 and were both shortly thereafter requisitioned by the British Admiralty for war service. The former was lost in November 1939 when it struck a mine off the Yorkshire coast. Batory, dubbed "the Lucky ship", became a troop and civilian carrier and hospital ship. It effected a major evacuation during the Battle of Narvik and completed hundreds of convoys on the Mediterranean Sea and on the Atlantic, before being surrendered to the control of the communist authorities in Warsaw in 1946.

In May 1941, the Polish destroyer Piorun—Thunderbolt—was able to locate and engage the world's most powerful battleship, Bismarck, drawing its fire for an hour while the Royal Navy caught up in time to destroy the German warship.

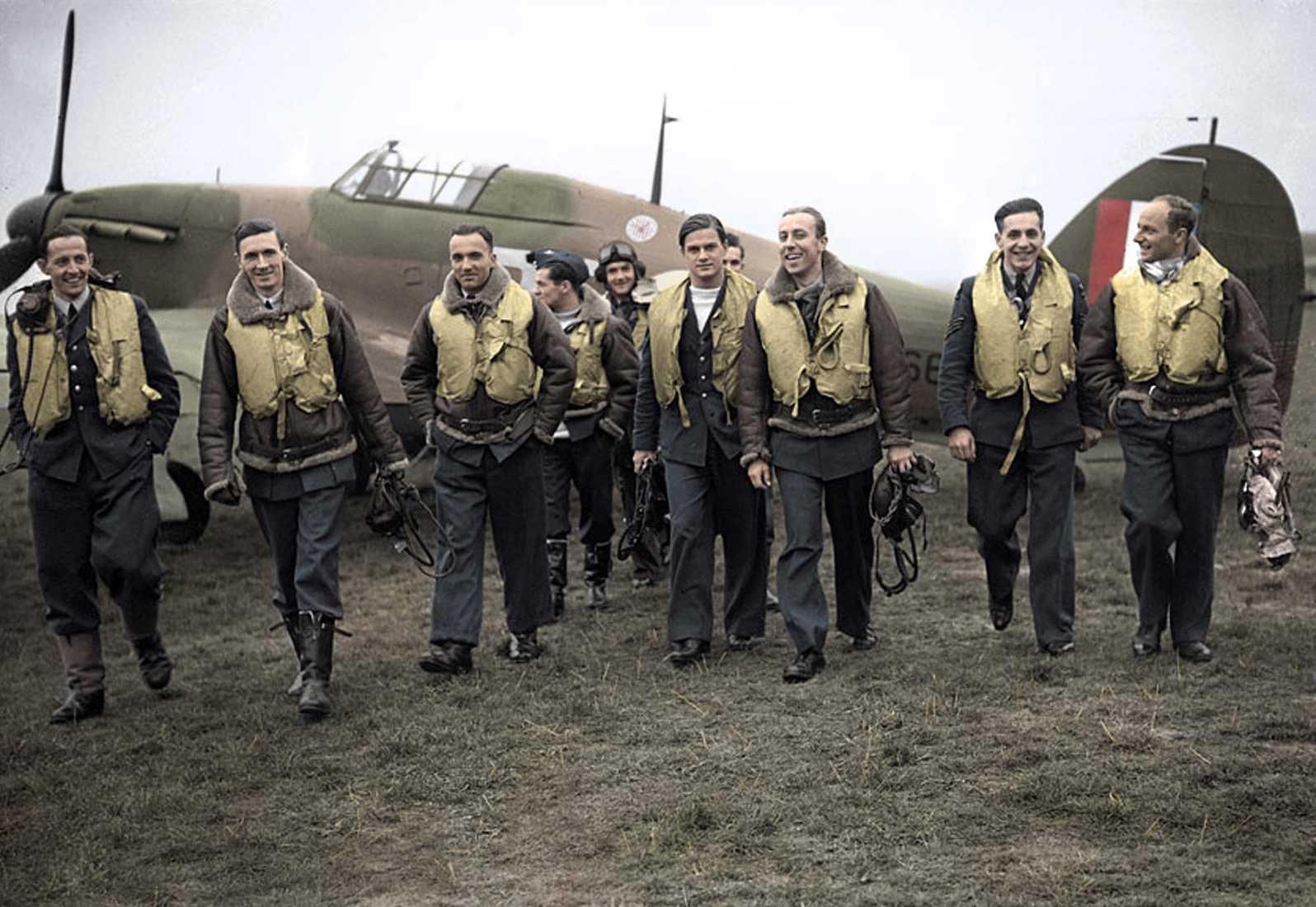
303 Fighter Squadron pilots and Hurricane, October 1940

Poles were the largest group of non-British personnel in the RAF during the Battle of Britain, and the 303 Polish Squadron was the most successful RAF unit in the Battle of Britain. Special Operations Executive had a large section of covert, elite Polish troops who cooperated closely with the Polish underground army.

By July 1945, there were 228,000 troops of the Polish Armed Forces in the West serving under the British. Many of these men and women came from the Kresy region (eastern Poland), including from the major cities of Lwów (now Lviv, Ukraine) and Wilno (now Vilnius, Lithuania). They had been deported by the Soviets from the Kresy to the gulags when Nazi Germany and the Soviet Union occupied Poland in 1939 under the Nazi-Soviet Pact. Two years later, when Churchill and Joseph Stalin formed an alliance against Adolf Hitler, the mostly "Kresy Poles" were released from the Gulags in Siberia to form "Anders' Army" and were made to walk via Kazakhstan, Uzbekistan and Turkmenistan, where thousands perished on the way, to Iran. There the Polish II Corps came into being under British command. They fought in the battles of Monte Cassino, the Falaise Gap, Arnhem, Tobruk, and in the liberation of many European cities, including Bologna and Breda.

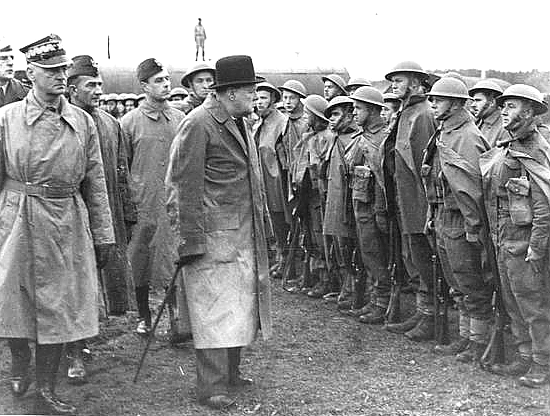
General Sikorski (left) and Winston Churchill review Polish troops in England, 1943.

The Polish troops who contributed to the Allied defeat of the Germans in North Africa and Italy, had expected to be able to return at war's end to their Kresy (eastern Polish) homeland in an independent and democratic Poland. But at Yalta, Roosevelt and Churchill acquiesced in Stalin's Soviet Union annexation of the Kresy lands (roughly half of pre-war Poland's landmass), in accordance with the provisions of the 1939 Nazi-Soviet Pact. This entailed massive postwar Polish population deportations to western so-called "Recovered Territories" assigned from Germany to Poland. The great majority of Polish soldiers, sailors, and airmen in the West would never return to their homeland. In apparent reaction to British acquiescence in Poland's postwar future, thirty officers and men of the Polish II Corps committed suicide.

Churchill explained the government's actions in a three-day Parliamentary debate, begun on 27 February 1945, which ended in a vote of confidence. Many MPs openly criticised Churchill over Yalta and voiced strong loyalty to the UK's Polish allies. Churchill may not have been confident that Poland would be the independent and democratic country to which Polish troops could return; he said: "His Majesty's Government will never forget the debt they owe to the Polish troops... I earnestly hope it will be possible for them to have citizenship and freedom of the British Empire, if they so desire."

During the debate, 25 MPs and Peers risked their future political careers to draft an amendment protesting against the UK's acceptance of a geographically reconfigured Poland's integration into the Soviet sphere of influence, thereby shifting it westwards into the heart of Europe. These members included Arthur Greenwood, Sir Archibald Southby, Alec Douglas-Home, Lord Willoughby de Eresby, and Victor Raikes. After the amendment was defeated, Henry Strauss, MP for Norwich, resigned his seat in protest at the British government's abandonment of Poland.

The Polish Institute and Sikorski Museum in London are the repository for archival material relating to this period.

==== Private Wojtek ====
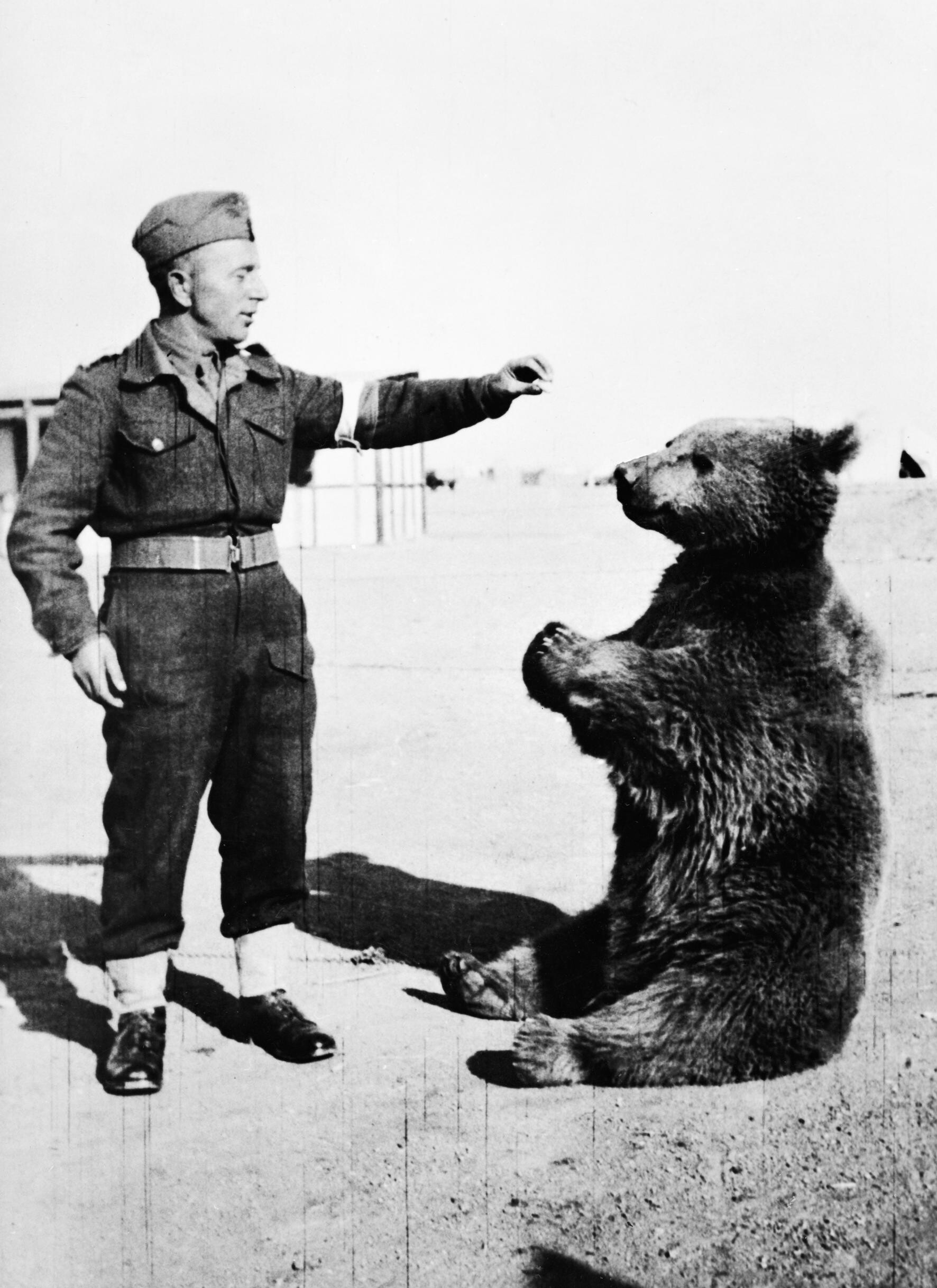
Wojtek (right) and fellow Polish soldier, 1943

During their 1942 evacuation from the Soviet Union to the Near East, soldiers of the Polish Second Corps had, at an Iranian railway station, purchased a Syrian brown bear cub. He travelled with them on the Polish troop-transport ship Kościuszko and subsequently accompanied them to Egypt and to the Italian campaign. In Italy he helped shift ammunition crates and became a celebrity with visiting Allied generals and statesmen.

In order to bring him to Italy, as regimental mascots and pets were not allowed onboard transport ships, the bear was formally enrolled as Private Wojciech Perski (his surname being the Polish adjective meaning "Persian"; Wojtek is the diminutive for Wojciech).

After the war, and mustered out of the Polish Army, Wojtek was billeted and lived out his retirement at the Edinburgh Zoo. He was visited by fellow exiles and former Polish comrades-in-arms and won the affection of the public. Posthumously he has inspired books, films, plaques, and statues in the UK and Poland.

=== Polish Resettlement Corps 1946–1949 ===
Following the invasion of Poland in September 1939, many thousands of Polish servicemen and women made their way via Hungary and Romania (which then had common borders with Poland) to France, where they again fought against the invading Germans; and in 1942 the newly formed Polish Second Corps evacuated from the Soviet Union, via Iran, to the Near East, subsequently fighting in campaigns there and in North Africa, Italy, and northwest Europe. Some Second Corps personnel transferred from the Near East into Polish Armed Services units in the UK.

At war's end, many of the Poles were transported to, and stayed in, camps in the United Kingdom. In order to ease their transition from a military environment to civilian life, a satisfactory means of demobilisation was sought by the British authorities. This took the form of a Polish Resettlement Corps (PRC), as an integral corps of the British Army, into which the Poles who wished to stay in the UK could enlist for the transitional period of their demobilisation.

The PRC was formed in 1946 (Army Order 96 of 1946) and was disbanded after fulfilling its purpose in 1949 (Army Order 2 of 1950).

=== Polish Resettlement Act 1947 ===
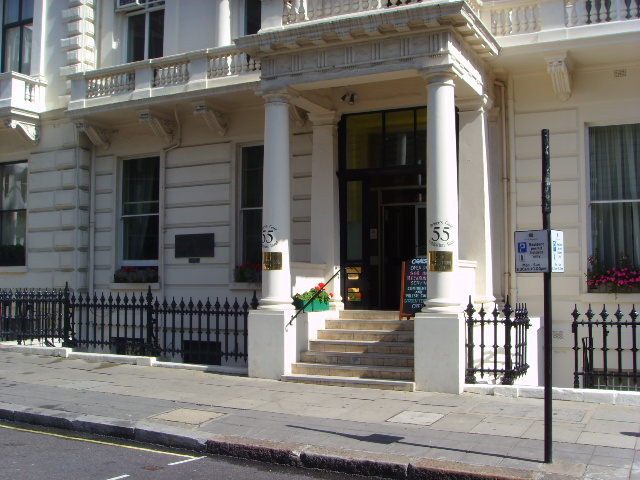
Polish Hearth Club, Exhibition Road, London, a Polish "hub" during and after WW II

When the Second World War ended, a communist government was installed in Poland. Most Poles felt betrayed by their wartime allies and declined to "return to Poland" either because their homeland had become a hostile foreign state or because of Soviet repressions of Poles, Soviet conduct during the Warsaw Uprising of 1944, the trial of the Sixteen, and executions of former members of the Home Army. To accommodate Poles unable to return to their home country, Britain enacted the Polish Resettlement Act 1947, Britain's first mass immigration law. Initially, a very large Polish community was centred around Swindon, where many military personnel had been stationed during the war.

After occupying Polish Resettlement Corps camps, many Poles settled in London and other conurbations, many of them recruited as European Volunteer Workers. Many others settled in the British Empire, forming large Polish Canadian and Polish Australian communities, or in the United States and Argentina.

=== Post-war dispersal and settlement ===
In the 1951 UK Census, some 162,339 residents had listed Poland as their birthplace, up from 44,642 in 1931. Polish arrivals to the UK included survivors of German concentration and POW camps and war wounded needing additional help adapting to civilian life. This help was provided by a range of charitable endeavours, some coordinated by Sue Ryder (1924–2000), a British humanitarian who, as Baroness Ryder of Warsaw, was later raised to the House of Lords and spoke there in the cause of Poland.

An estimated 99,000 Poles who resettled in Great Britain, roughly 60% of the post-war community, had experienced deportation from eastern Poland to the Soviet Union in 1940. Following the Sikorski-Mayski agreement, these Poles were evacuated first to Iran, after which civilian refugees were sent to British Imperial territories in India and East Africa. The patterns of community formation seen in these refugee communities in the British Imperial periphery informed the patterns that emerged in PRC accommodation in post-war Britain.

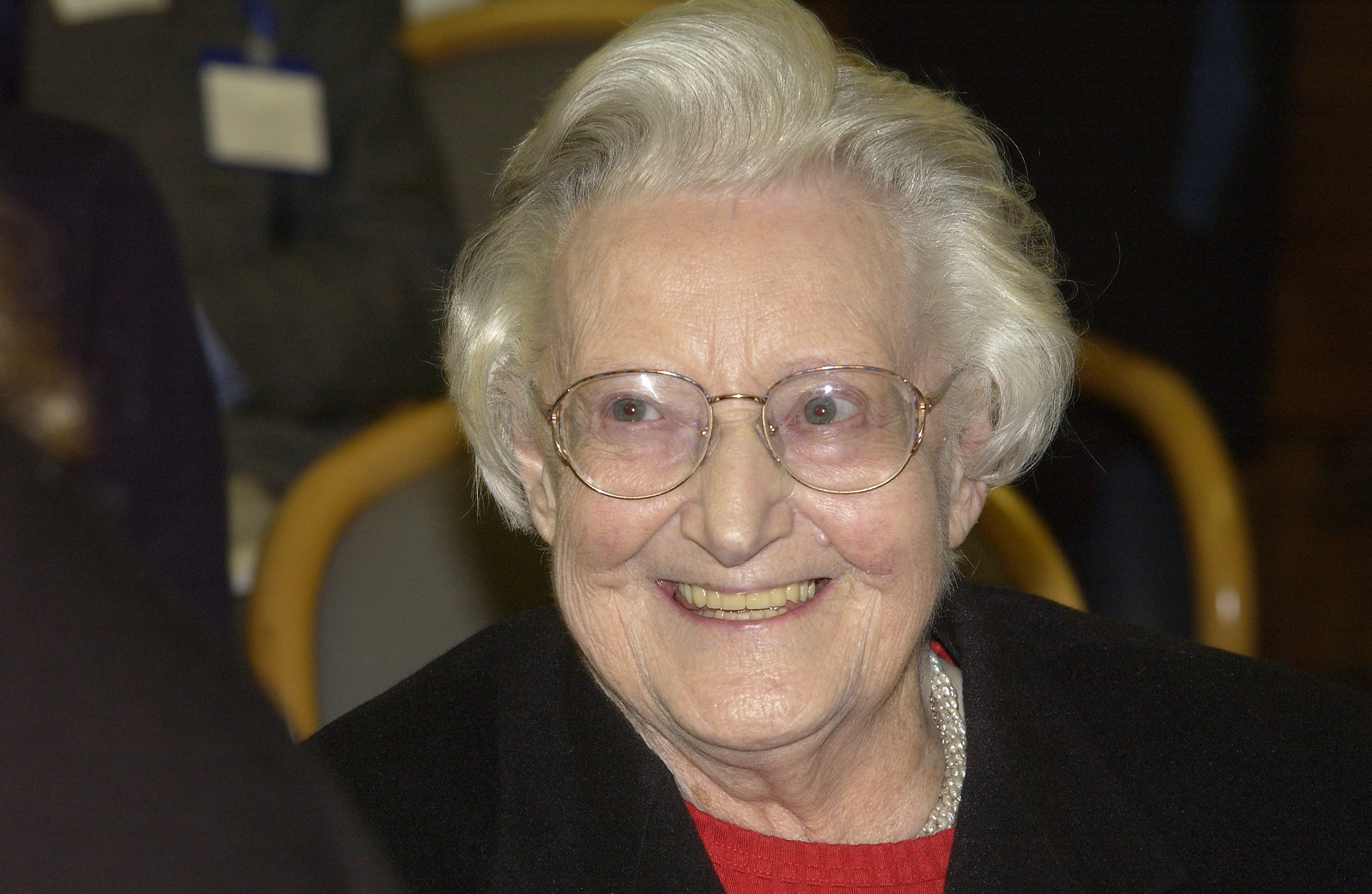
Dame Cicely Saunders, hospice-movement pioneer

Another British woman, Dame Cicely Saunders, was inspired by three displaced Polish men to revolutionise palliative care and care of the dying. She met the first two, David Tasma—who had escaped from the Warsaw Ghetto—and Antoni Michniewicz, as they were dying. The third Pole, Marian Bohusz-Szyszko, a painter and art critic, supported her work and became her husband in old age. Saunders is considered the founder of the hospice movement.

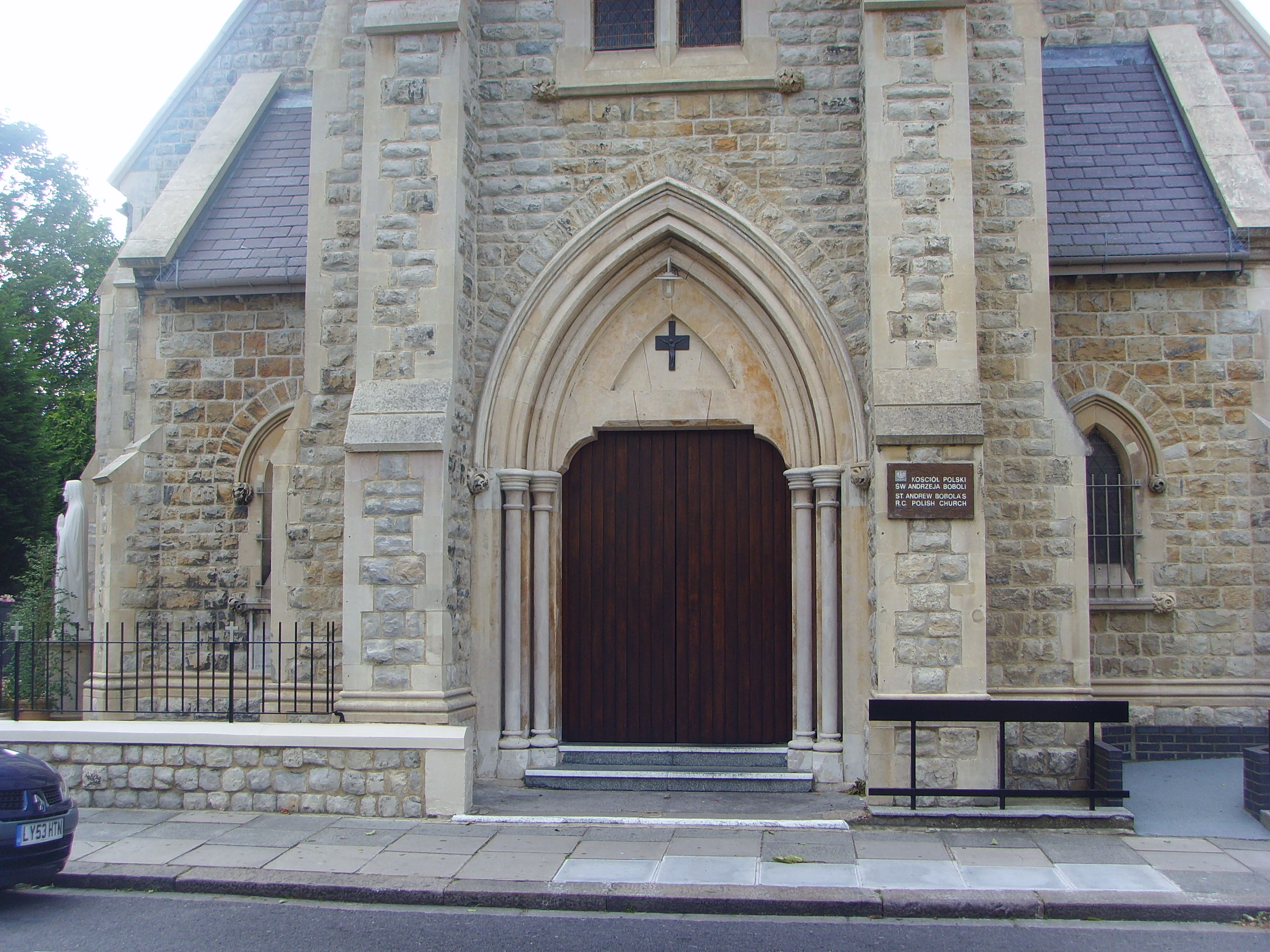
Entrance to St Andrew Bobola Church, Hammersmith

Britain's Polish immigrants tended to settle in areas near Polish churches and food outlets. In West London, they settled in Earl's Court, known in the 1950s as the "Polish Corridor", in reference to the interwar Central European political entity and, as house prices rose, they moved to Hammersmith, then Ealing, and in South London, to Lewisham and Balham. As these communities grew, even if many Poles had integrated with local British educational and religious institutions, the Polish Catholic Mission in England and Wales, in agreement with the English and Scottish hierarchies, considered that Polish priests should minister to Polish parishioners. The original Polish church in London in Devonia Road, Islington was bought in 1928 with much delay, following the First World War. However canonically, subsequent Polish "parishes" are actually branches of the Polish Catholic Mission and not parishes in the conventional sense and are accountable to the episcopate in Poland, through a vicar delegate, although each is located in a British Catholic diocese, to whom it owes the courtesy of being connected. The first post-war Polish "parish" in London was attached to Brompton Oratory in South Kensington, followed by a chapel in Willesden staffed by Polish Jesuits. Brockley-Lewisham was founded in 1951, followed by Clapham, while St Andrew Bobola church in Shepherd's Bush (1962) was regarded as the "Polish garrison" church. Among its many commemorative plaques is one to a clairvoyant and healer housewife and Soviet deportee, Waleria Sikorzyna: she had had a detailed premonitory dream two years before the 1939 invasion of Poland, but was politely dismissed by the Polish military authorities. Currently the Polish Catholic Mission operates around 219 parishes and pastoral centres with 114 priests throughout England and Wales. In 2007 Cardinal Cormac Murphy-O'Connor, primate of England, expressed concern "that Poles are creating a separate Church in Britain", but Polish rector, Mgr Kukla, responded that the Polish Catholic Mission continued to have a "good relationship" with the hierarchy in England and Wales and said that integration was a long process.

=== Cultural and educational ties with Poland ===
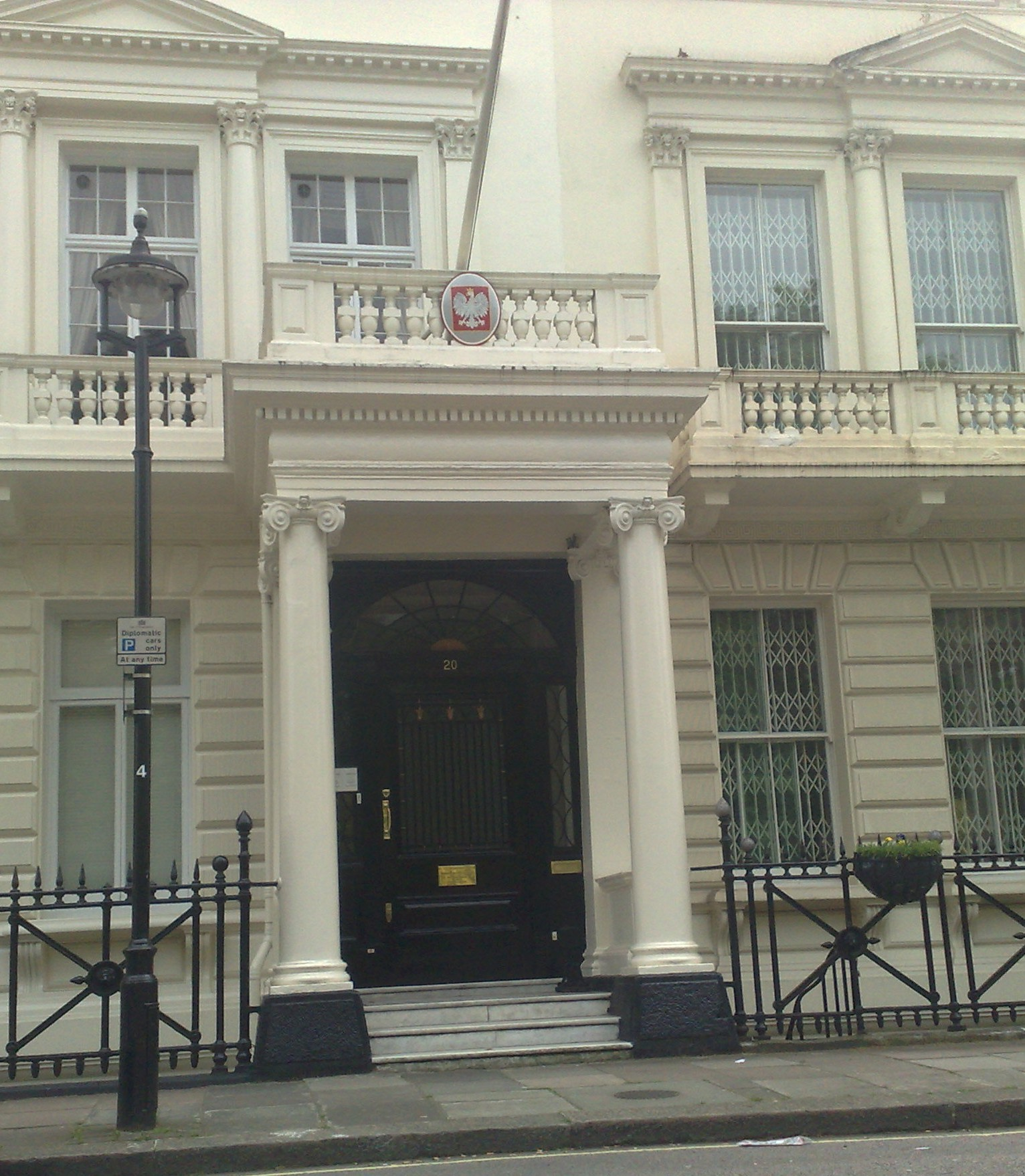
Polish Institute and Sikorski Museum, a leading Polish archive and museum in London founded on 2 May 1945

The social make-up of successive waves of Polish migration to the UK is comparable to 19th- and early-20th-century Polish migrations to France. In both cases, the original mainly political migrants were drawn largely from elite and educated strata and reflected the heterogeneity of their class, and they quickly established cultural institutions such as libraries and learned societies. They included representatives of past Polish minorities such as Jews, Germans, Armenians, Georgians, Ruthenians, and people of Muslim Tatar descent. In both cases, they were followed by waves of more socially-homogeneous economic migrants.

Since the Second World War, Poland has lost much of its earlier ethnic diversity, with the exception of Polska Roma, a distinct ethnolinguistic group and other Polish Roma communities, and this has been reflected in recent Polish migrations to the UK. A recent study of comparative literature by Mieczysŀaw Dąbrowski, of Warsaw University, appears to bear this out.

A key military and latterly, news and cultural role was played by broadcasts in Polish, beamed to Poland, from London by the BBC's Polish section. They began on 7 September 1939 with coded messages among prosaic material for the Polish Underground and after expansion into English by radio ended on 23 December 2005, a victim of budgetary cuts and new priorities.

Across the mainland UK, in the late 1940s and early 1950s, the original Polish communities chiefly comprised former members of the Polish Resettlement Corps. They set up Polish clubs, cultural centres, and adult and youth organisations, e.g., the Polish Youth Group (KSMP). They contributed to, and in turn were supported by, veterans' welfare charities such as veterans' SPK (Stowarzyszenie Polskich Kombatantów), airmen's and naval clubs. These organisations' original aims were to provide venues for socialising and exposure to Polish culture and heritage for children of former Polish Resettlement Corps members. Many of these groups remain active, and steps are being taken to cater to more recent Polish migrants.

The post-war phase saw a continuation of Polish intellectual and political life in microcosm in the UK, with the publication of newspapers and journals such as Dziennik Polski and Wiadomości, the establishment of independent (of the Polish "regime") publishing houses such as "Veritas" and "Odnowa", with a worldwide reach, and professional theatrical productions under the auspices of a dramatic society, "Syrena". Orbis Books (London) was a bookseller, publishing house and for a time a record producer (under the label Polonia UK), founded in Edinburgh in 1944 by Kapt. Józef Olechnowicz, brought to New Oxford Street, London in 1946 and eventually bought by Jerzy Kulczycki in 1972. Poles in London played their part in the blossoming of modern art movements during the Swinging Sixties. Chief among them were two gallery owners, the painter, Halima Nałęcz, at the Drian Gallery in Bayswater and the pharmacist and philanthropist, Mateusz Grabowski with his Grabowski Gallery in Sloane Avenue, Chelsea, London. Grabowski promoted Polish and other diaspora artists, such as Pauline Boty, Frank Bowling, Józef Czapski, Stanisław Frenkiel, Bridget Riley and Aubrey Williams.

Concern for the maintenance of Polish language and culture in the UK was entrusted to the "Polska Macierz Szkolna" – Polish Educational Society, a voluntary organization that operated a network of Saturday schools. Parishes also organized an active Polish scout movement (ZHP pgk). Polish religious orders founded boarding schools in England. In 1947 The Sisters of the Holy Family of Nazareth started a school for girls, The Holy Family of Nazareth Convent School in Pitsford near Northampton. Displaced members of the Polish Marian Fathers opened a first school for boys in Herefordshire. Then with financial help from the Polish diaspora, they acquired a vacant historic property on the river Thames outside Henley-on-Thames which became "Divine Mercy College" and a heritage museum at Fawley Court, a Grade I listed building, which functioned as a college from 1953 to 1986 and as a museum and retreat and conference centre until about 2010, when it was sold off by the Polish order amid controversy. In the grounds of the property is a church building and Columbarium (1071) commissioned by Prince Radziwill in memory of his mother, Anna Lubomirska. The prince was himself laid to rest there in 1976. It is Grade II listed by English Heritage.

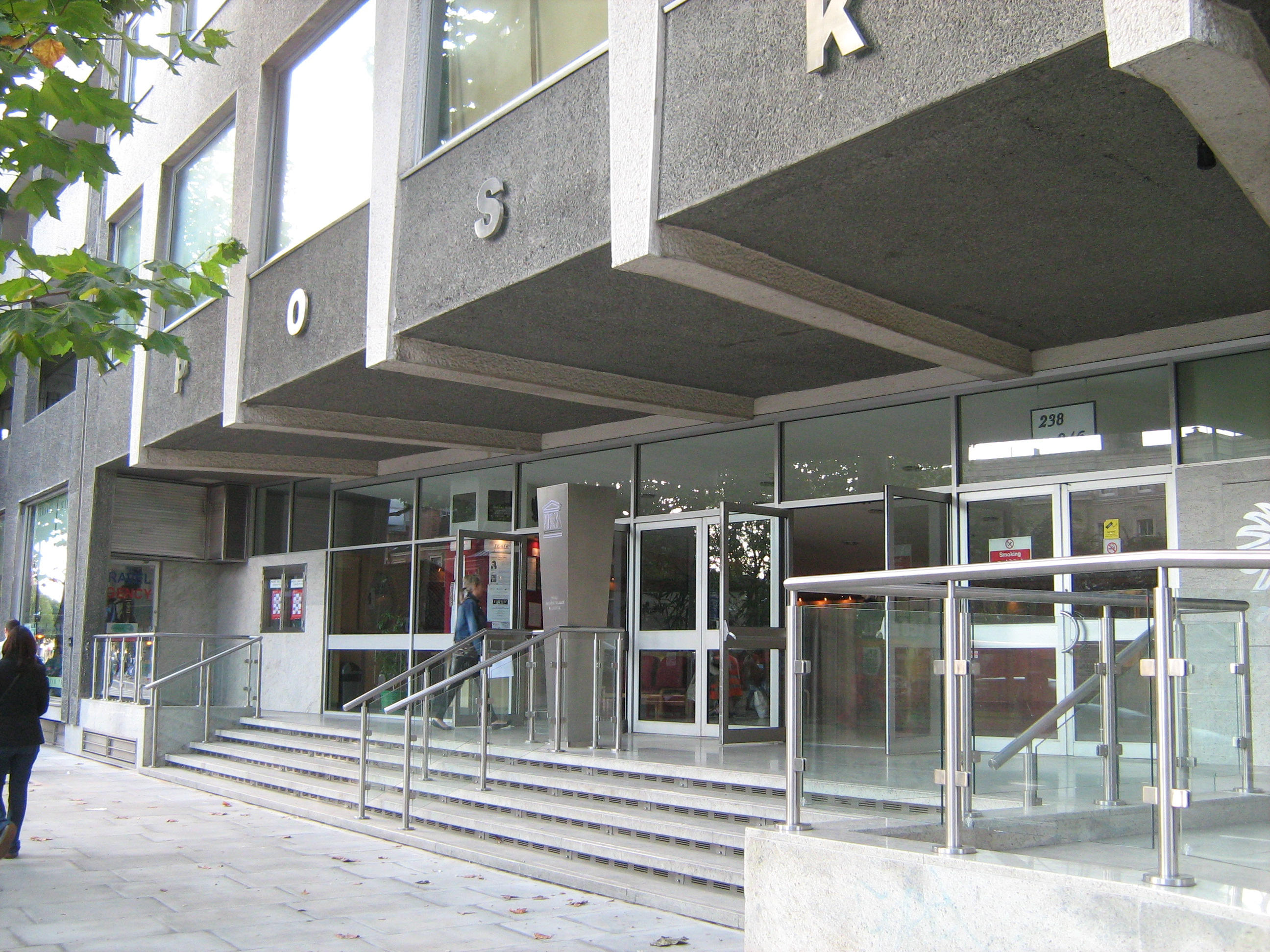
Polish Social and Cultural Centre (POSK) building, Hammersmith

As a result of the 1939 invasion of Poland, the entirety of Polish universities and academic research fell into disarray. Although very reduced tertiary teaching continued underground, many academics perished in Katyn and in Concentration camps or shared the fate of the civilian population. Those who were abroad at the outbreak of war or who managed to escape set about salvaging their heritage outside Poland. During the war several British universities hosted Polish academic departments to enable Polish students to complete their interrupted studies: thus Liverpool offered veterinary science in Polish and Oxford hosted a Polish faculty of law, and Edinburgh had a Polish Medical Faculty, whose alumni fortuitously joined the roll out of the National Health Service in the UK. These arrangements came to an end in the late 1940s and to cater for many demobilized service personnel wishing to resume their studies or research, "PUNO" (Polski Uniwersytet na Obczyznie) – The Polish University Abroad was founded in 1949, offering humanities subjects in Polish. It exists to this day with a London base at the Polish Social and Cultural Centre in Hammersmith and has opened departments in other European countries. During the Cold War, Poles assembled twice in the UK to mark historic national events. The first was in 1966 the Millennium of Poland's baptism as a Christian nation, when among other festivities, a Mass was celebrated in London's White City Stadium, filled to its 45,000 capacity. The second gathering was during the visit by the Polish pontiff, Pope John Paul II, to the United Kingdom in 1982. While the Pope visited nine British cities and was welcomed by two million British Roman Catholics and others, a Mass specifically for 20,000 Polish faithful was held at the Crystal Palace stadium in London on Sunday 30 May.

=== Symbolism of political governance ===
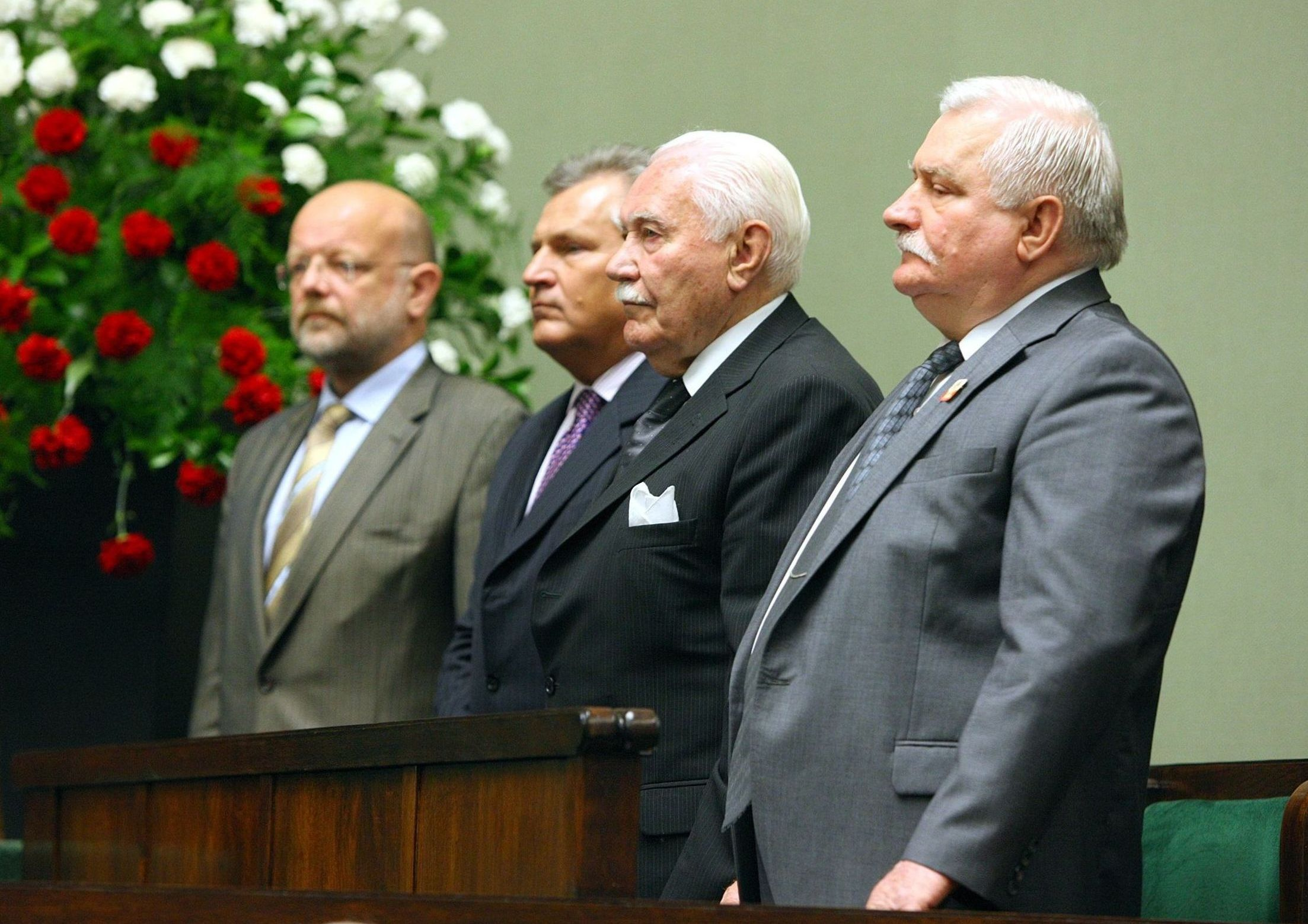
From left: Piotr Kownacki, Aleksander Kwaśniewski, Ryszard Kaczorowski, Lech Wałęsa, on 20th anniversary of re-establishment of Polish Senate in Warsaw

In December 1990, when Lech Wałęsa became the first non-Communist president of Poland since the war, the ceremonial insignia of the Polish Republic, including the original text of the Polish 1935 constitution were handed over to him in Warsaw by the last "President" of the London-based government-in-exile, Ryszard Kaczorowski. This act symbolized the legitimate transfer of independent Poland's seals of office and put an end to the political opposition that, for half a century, had both dogged and been the bedrock of the Polish diaspora in the United Kingdom. Arguably a majority of Polish people had fought hard to combat communism, and for their right to democratic liberties. While an increasingly frail and diminishing group upheld the existence of the "Zamek" – "Citadel" shorthand for the Polish National Council as the "virtual opposition" to the communist regime in Poland it held little sway with the Polish diaspora in the UK. Instead, London came to be seen as an important centre for fostering business and cultural relations with contemporary Poland.

=== Economic activity ===
For the duration of the Cold War and the Iron Curtain, Poles in the UK were engaged in a massive effort of helping economically their relatives and friends in Poland. Initially they sent food parcels and medicines as Poland recovered from the ravages of war then the assistance changed to money transfers, sometimes from their own meagre pensions, in the belief that they were still better off living in freedom. Tazab and Haskoba were the earliest UK-based parcel operations, while Grabowski was a mail order pharmacy. When Poland raised import tariffs, they turned their focus in the mid-1950s to travel, like Fregata Travel, the latter being a brand that had migrated to London from pre-war Lwow. With banking agreements with Poland in place, the travel companies acted as transfer bureaux via the Polish bank PKO.

The relaxation of travel restrictions to and from Poland after October 1956 saw a steady increase in Polish exchanges with the United Kingdom in the 1950s. In the 1960s a purge of communist party members and intellectuals of Jewish descent led to a further influx of Poles into the UK. Only with the accession of Edward Gierek in 1970 as First Secretary of the Polish Workers' Party (PZPR), who himself had spent time as a migrant in France and Belgium, did it become possible for Poles to leave their country with relative ease.

The Polish Trustee Association, founded by the Ex-Combatants (SPK), handled legacies left by Polish DPs for their kin in Poland.

=== Remembrance ===
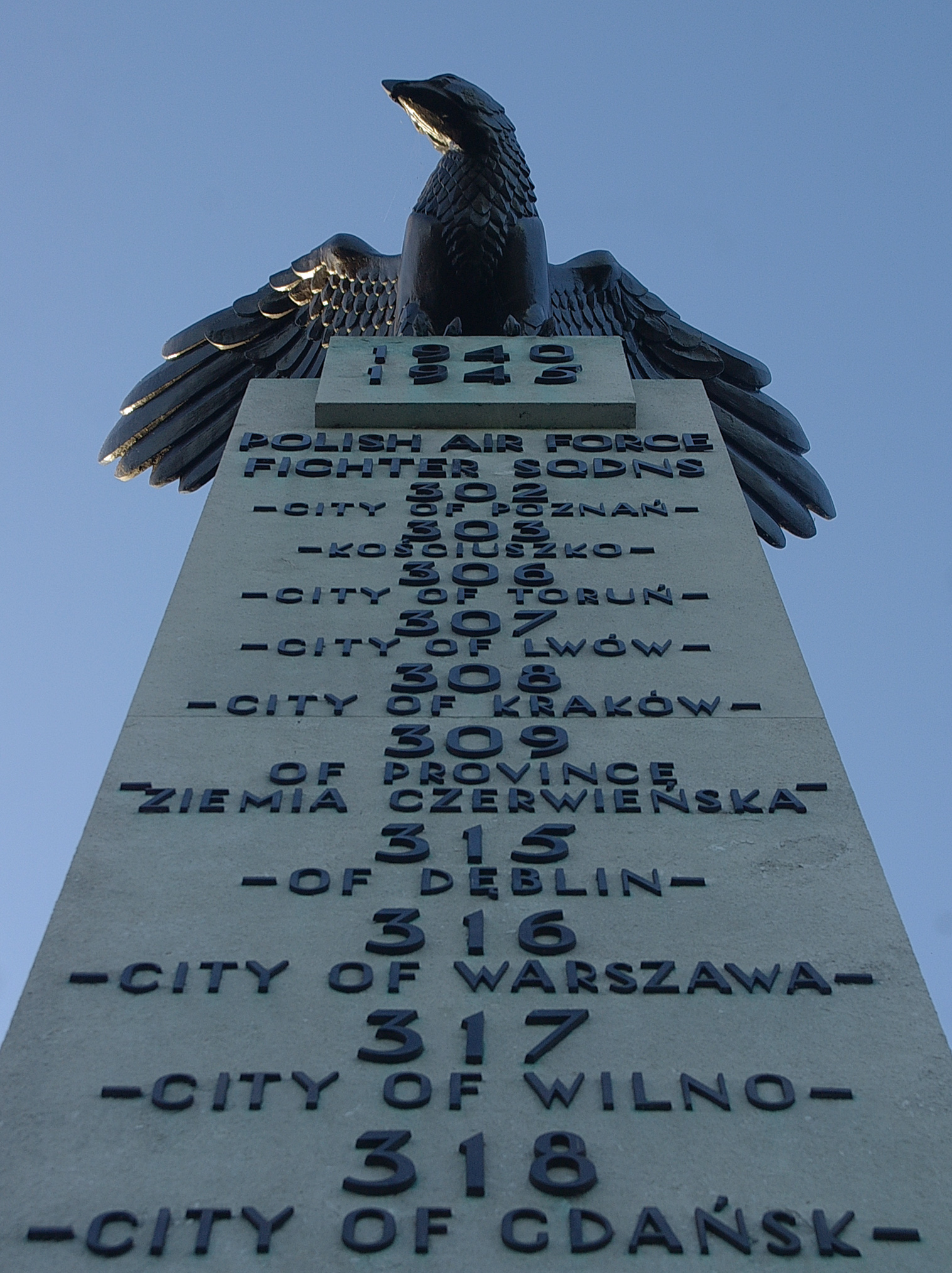
Mieczysław Lubelski's memorial to Polish airmen at Northolt

Polish servicemen who died in the Battle of Britain or subsequently, found their final resting places mainly in six cemeteries across the United Kingdom: Newark-on-Trent, Blackpool, Brookwood Cemetery, Surrey, Yatesbury in Wiltshire, Grangemouth in Scotland, and Wrexham in Wales. Then, as the first generation of émigrés settled in various urban areas, often clustered around Polish clubs and churches, their graves and memorials began to appear in nearby existing cemeteries. Thus in London and its environs there were Polish burials especially in Brompton (Central London), Gunnersbury, Mortlake, Norwood and Putney Vale cemeteries.

The Polish War Memorial, in a prominent position close to RAF Northolt West of London, commemorating the Polish airmen who fought for Great Britain, was erected in two stages. It was initially unveiled in 1948 with the names of 1,243 flyers. In time, a further 659 names were identified and were added during a refurbishment of the monument carried out in 1994-6 funded by a public appeal. It was ceremonially re-opened. In 2015 a memorial garden was added to mark the 75th anniversary of the battle. The monument is Grade II listed by English Heritage. Franciszek Kornicki (1916–2017) is the last Polish fighter pilot to die. His funeral was held in November 2017.

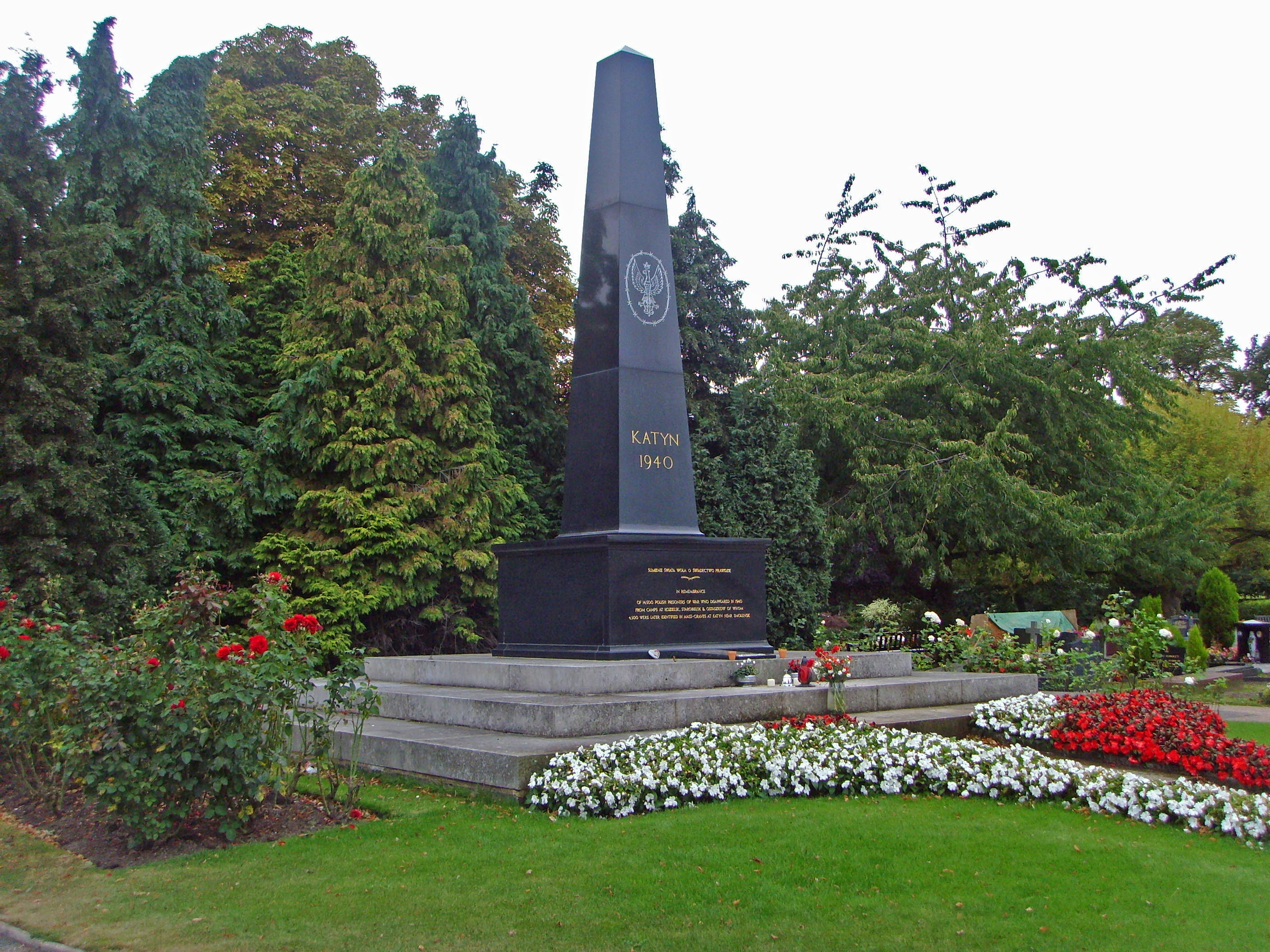
Katyn Monument

By contrast, the wish of the British Polish community to honour its 28,000 fellow countrymen, many of them close relatives, who fell victim of the Katyn massacre with a memorial met with sustained obstruction from the British authorities. This, it appears, was owing to the effective diplomatic pressure exerted by the Soviet Union on Anglo-Soviet relations at the height of the Cold War. Despite public funds having been raised, the project was delayed for many years. A measure of détente in East-West relations in the mid-1970s, allowed a monument to be installed inside Gunnersbury Cemetery. There was no official British attendance at the unveiling in September 1976. Those British officials who came, did so in their private capacity.

There are now over a dozen Polish war memorials across the UK, including in the RAF church, St Clement Danes in the City of London and St Andrew Bobola Church, Hammersmith.

=== 21st-century economic immigration ===
Polish natives employed in UK, 2003–10.

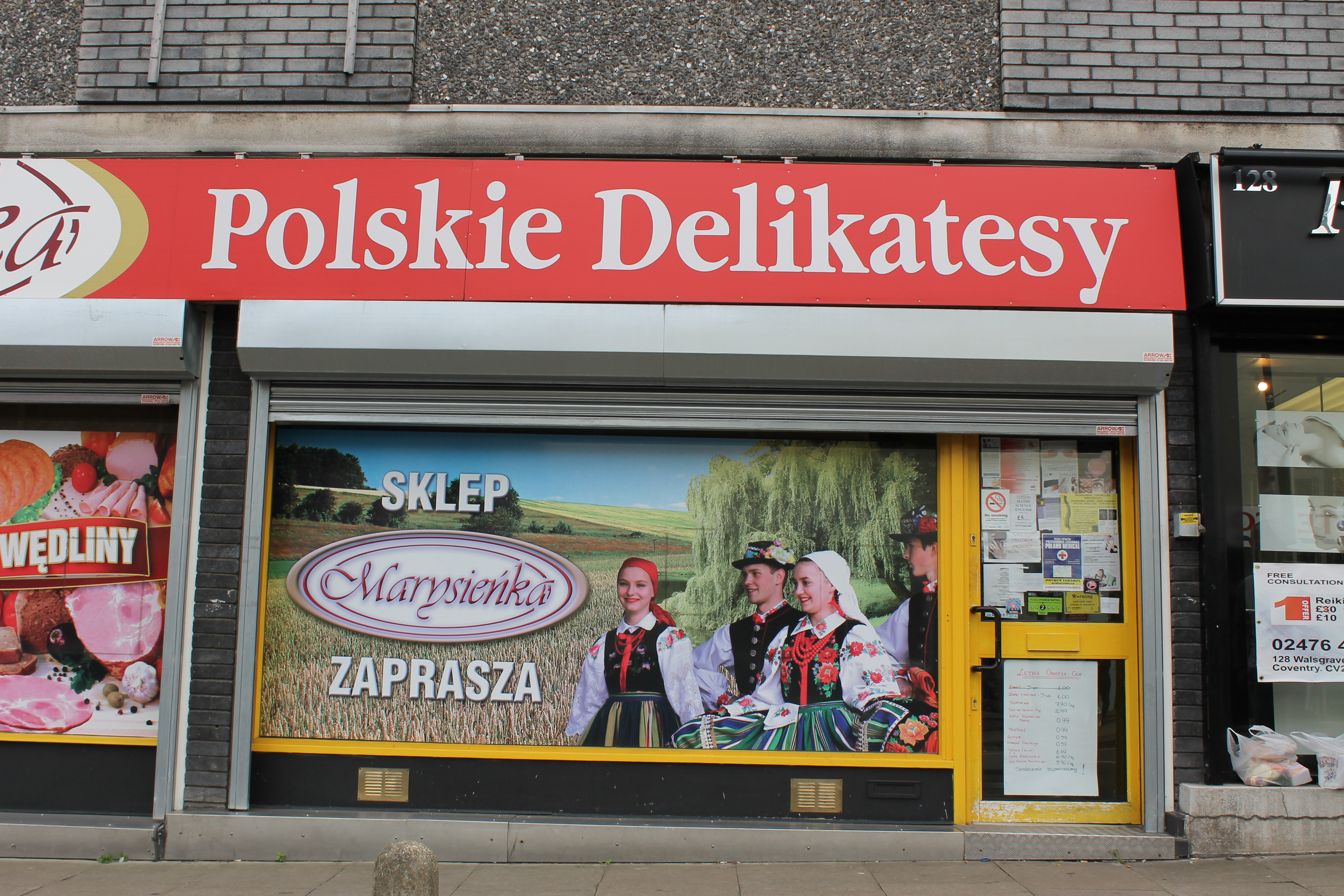
More Polish shops opened up across the UK after Poland joined the EU in 2004, such as this delicatessen in Coventry

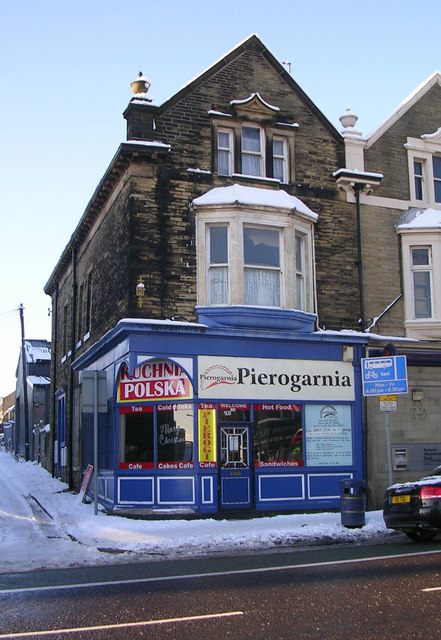
Polish pierogi bar in West Yorkshire

During the twentieth century, world events meant that in Europe, London eclipsed Paris as the traditional destination of choice for Polish dissidents. The establishment of Polish communities across the UK after the Second World War along with supporting institutions cemented links between the UK-Polish community and relatives and friends in Poland. This encouraged a steady flow of migrants from Poland to the UK, which accelerated after the fall of Communism in 1989. Throughout the 1990s, Poles used the eased travel restrictions to move to the UK and work, sometimes in the grey economy.

Poland joined the EU on 1 May 2004 and Poles, as EU citizens, gained the right to freedom of movement and establishment across the European Union. Most member states, though, had negotiated temporary restrictions to their labour markets, up to a maximum of seven years, for citizens from new member states. To the contrary, the UK (as Sweden too) granted immediate full access to its labour market to citizens from the new member states. over entrants from these accession states,

Seven-year temporary restrictions on benefits that EU citizens including Poles could claim, covered by the Worker Registration Scheme, ended in 2011.

The Home Office publishes quarterly statistics on applications to the Worker Registration Scheme. Figures published in August 2007 indicated that some 656,395 persons were accepted on to the scheme between 1 May 2004 and 30 June 2007, of whom 430,395 were Polish nationals. However, as the scheme is voluntary, offers no financial incentive and is not enforced; immigrants are free to choose whether or not to participate. They may work legally in the UK provided they have a Polish identity card or passport and a UK National Insurance number. This has led to some estimates of Polish nationals in the UK being much higher. Department for Work and Pensions (DWP) publishes quarterly reports containing data on National Insurance number (NINo) allocations to adult overseas nationals entering the UK. The number of Polish nationals’ NINo registrations peaked between 2006 and 2008. In the financial year 2006/07 there were 220,430 Polish nationals receiving NINo registration (31% of all NINo registrations to adult overseas nationals entering the UK) and in 2007/2008- 210,660 (29% of all registrations to adult overseas nationals). The number of NINo registrations granted to Polish citizens has been in significant decline since 2016 referendum. In the year to June 2016 Polish born adults received 105 thousand NINo's, 18% less than in the year before a 13% share of all NINo registrations to adult overseas nationals entering the UK. The latest statistical data covering the year to the end of March 2020 shows a further decrease in Polish NINo registrations. During this period 38 thousand Polish citizens received NINos - 13% less than in the previous year and a significantly smaller share of all adult overseas registrations compared with previous years - 5%.

The Polish magazine Polityka launched a 'Stay With Us' scheme offering young academics a £5,000 bonus to encourage them to live and work at home in Poland. Additionally on 20 October 2007, a campaign was launched by the British Polish Chamber of Commerce called "Wracaj do Polski" ('Come Back to Poland') which encouraged Poles living and working in the UK to return home.

By the end of 2007, stronger economic growth in Poland than in the UK, falling unemployment and the rising strength of the Polish złoty had reduced the economic incentive for Poles to migrate to the UK. Poland was one of the few countries to not be badly affected by the Great Recession. Labour shortages in Polish cities and in sectors such as construction, IT and financial services have also played a part in stemming the flow of Poles to the UK. According to the August 2007 Accession Monitoring Report, fewer Poles migrated in the first half of 2007 than in the same period in 2006.

== Demographics ==
Historical population
Year	Pop.	±%
2001	66,000	—
2002	68,000	+3.0%
2003	75,000	+10.3%
2004	94,000	+25.3%
2005	162,000	+72.3%
2006	265,000	+63.6%
2007	411,000	+55.1%
2008	504,000	+22.6%
2009	529,000	+5.0%
2010	540,000	+2.1%
2011	654,000	+21.1%
2012	658,000	+0.6%
2013	688,000	+4.6%
2014	790,000	+14.8%
2015	831,000	+5.2%
2016	911,000	+9.6%
2017	922,000	+1.2%
2018	832,000	−9.8%
2019	695,000	−16.5%
2020	691,000	−0.6%
2021	682,000	−1.3%
Note: Apart from the actual 2001 and 2011 Census figures, the numbers in the central column are ONS estimates of the number of Polish-born residents. See source for 95 per cent confidence intervals. Source:

=== Population size ===
Polish born residents in the 20th century peaked in Britain at around 162,339 at the 1951 census, having risen from 44,462 at the 1931 census. The overwhelming majority in 1931 were Jewish and for specifically Polish born Christians the figure was 4,500. Following on from 1951 saw a steady decline to 127,246 in 1961, 110,925 in 1971, 93,721 in 1981 and 73,951 in 1991.

The 2001 UK Census recorded 60,711 Polish-born UK residents; 60,680 of these resided in Great Britain (not including Northern Ireland), compared to 73,951 in 1991. Following immigration after Poland's accession to the EU, the Office for National Statistics estimated that 832,000 Polish-born residents lived in the UK by 2018, making Poles the largest overseas-born group, having outgrown the Indian-born population. Unofficial estimates from 2007 had put the number of Poles living in the UK higher, at up to one million.

The 2011 UK Census recorded 579,121 Polish-born residing in England, 18,023 in Wales, 55,231 in Scotland, and 19,658 in Northern Ireland.

The Office for National Statistics estimates that the Polish-born population of the UK was 691,000 in 2020. The 2021 census recorded 743,083 Polish-born residents in England and Wales, 75,351 in Scotland, and 22,335 in Northern Ireland.

=== Geographic distribution ===
Distribution of Polish-born people by ward in London. 0.0%-1.99% 2%-2.99% 3%-4.99% 5%-6.99% 7%-8.99% 9% and greater

Polish-born population by region and country
Region / Country	Population	%	Largest community
England	718,251	???%	—N/a
Greater London	149,397	???%	Ealing – 18,816 (???%)
South East	112,415	???%	Southampton – 11,803 (???%)
East of England	81,049	???%	Luton – 8,779 (???%)
East Midlands	79,843	???%	North Northamptonshire – 10,234 (???%)
North West	76,688	???%	Manchester – 7,804 (???%)
West Midlands	72,749	???%	Birmingham – 9,965 (???%)
Yorkshire and The Humber	70,820	???%	Leeds – 9,824 (???%)
South West	63,159	???%	Bristol – 8,770 (???%)
North East	12,131	???%	Newcastle – 2,206 (???%)
Scotland	75,351	???%	Edinburgh – 13,842 (???%)
Wales	24,832	???%	Wrexham – 3,516 (???%)
Northern Ireland	22,335	???%	??? – ??? (???%)
Figures based on the 2021 United Kingdom Census

Polish-speakers in England and Wales

According to the 2011 UK Census in England and Wales, there are 0.5 million residents whose main language is Polish; which amounts to 1% of the whole population aged three years and over. In London, there were 147,816 Polish speakers. The main concentration of Polish people in London is in Ealing, in West London (21,507; 6.4% of all usual residents). Elsewhere in the capital, the biggest Polish communities are in the outer Boroughs of: Haringey, Brent, Hounslow, Waltham Forest, Barnet. Outside London, the largest Polish communities are in: Birmingham, Southampton, Slough (8,341; 5.9%), Luton, Leeds, Peterborough, Nottingham, Manchester, Leicester, Coventry and the Borough of Boston in Lincolnshire (2,975; 4.6%).

Scotland has seen a significant influx of Polish immigrants. Estimates of the number of Poles living in Scotland in 2007 ranged from 40,000 (General Register Office for Scotland) to 50,000 (the Polish Council). The 2011 UK Census recorded 11,651 people in Edinburgh born in Poland, which is 2.4% of the city's population – a higher proportion than anywhere else in Scotland apart from Aberdeen, where 2.7% were born in Poland.

In Northern Ireland, the number of people reporting in the 2011 census that they were born in Poland was 19,658, and the number stating that they spoke Polish as a first language was 17,700. Despite a Police Service of Northern Ireland (PSNI) recruitment drive in November 2006 that attracted 968 applications from Poles, with language exams being held both in Northern Ireland and in Warsaw, as of 2008, none had entered the PSNI's ranks. The first Polish national to join the PSNI started working in August 2010.

=== Employment and social activities ===
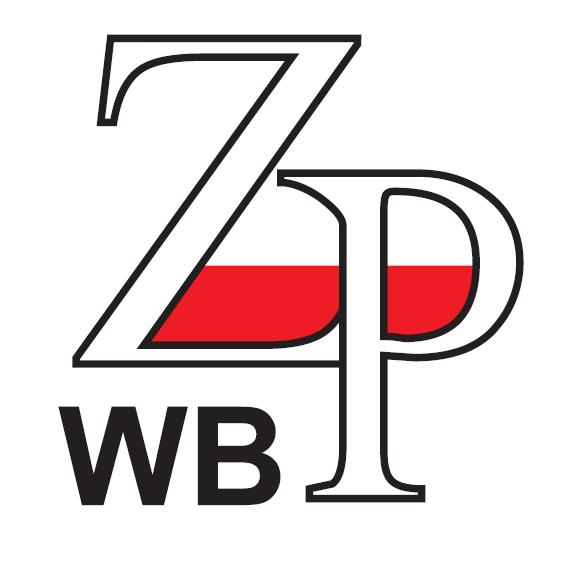
Federation of Poles in Great Britain logo

In London and various other major cities, Poles are employed across virtually all sectors from care work, construction, hospitality sector to education, NHS, banking and financial services. There is a significant group of people involved in the arts, in writing, journalism and photography. In rural areas of low-population density, such as East Anglia and the East Midlands; Polish workers tend to be employed in agriculture and light industry.

The Polish Social and Cultural Centre in Hammersmith which houses a number of organisations, an exhibition space, a theatre and several restaurants, is a popular venue. The Federation of Poles in Great Britain (ZPWB) which was set up to promote the interests of Poles in Great Britain acts as an umbrella for more than seventy organisations throughout the UK. Both these institutions also aim to promote awareness of Polish history and culture among British people.

Since Poland's accession to the European Union in 2004, Polish delicatessens, with regular deliveries of fresh produce from Poland, are an increasingly familiar feature along British streets and foodstuffs from Poland are supplied to most of the supermarket chains. New publications in Polish have joined the pre-existing titles, including several free magazines carrying news and features and filled with advertising are booming. A local newspaper in Blackpool is one of a handful of British newspapers to have its own online edition in Polish called Witryna Polska.

== Social questions ==
=== Education ===
Many Poles who have migrated to the UK since the enlargement of the EU have brought children with them. The young families have created some pressure on schools and English-language support services. Despite language difficulties, research shows these pupils perform well in British schools, and the presence of Polish pupils in schools has appeared to improve the performance of other pupils in those schools. The Coalition Government planned to abolish exams in Polish by 2018, among other languages, at GCSE and A-Level, on the grounds that they were no longer cost-effective due to "falling popularity"; but these plans were scrapped in the wake of protests in Parliament and a petition co-ordinated by the Polish Educational Society.

=== Integration and intermarriage ===
Polish newcomers to the United Kingdom follow previous patterns of ethnic integration, depending on where they can afford to live, on their educational and employment status, and on the presence of other ethnicities. In 2012 most of the 21,000 children born to Polish mothers had Polish fathers; the remainder had fathers of other backgrounds. In 2014 there were 16,656 children born with Polish mothers and fathers from European backgrounds (Other white and white British). Some 702 children were recorded as born to Polish mothers and fathers from African backgrounds, and 749 children born to Polish mothers and fathers from Asian and Middle Eastern backgrounds.

=== Discrimination ===
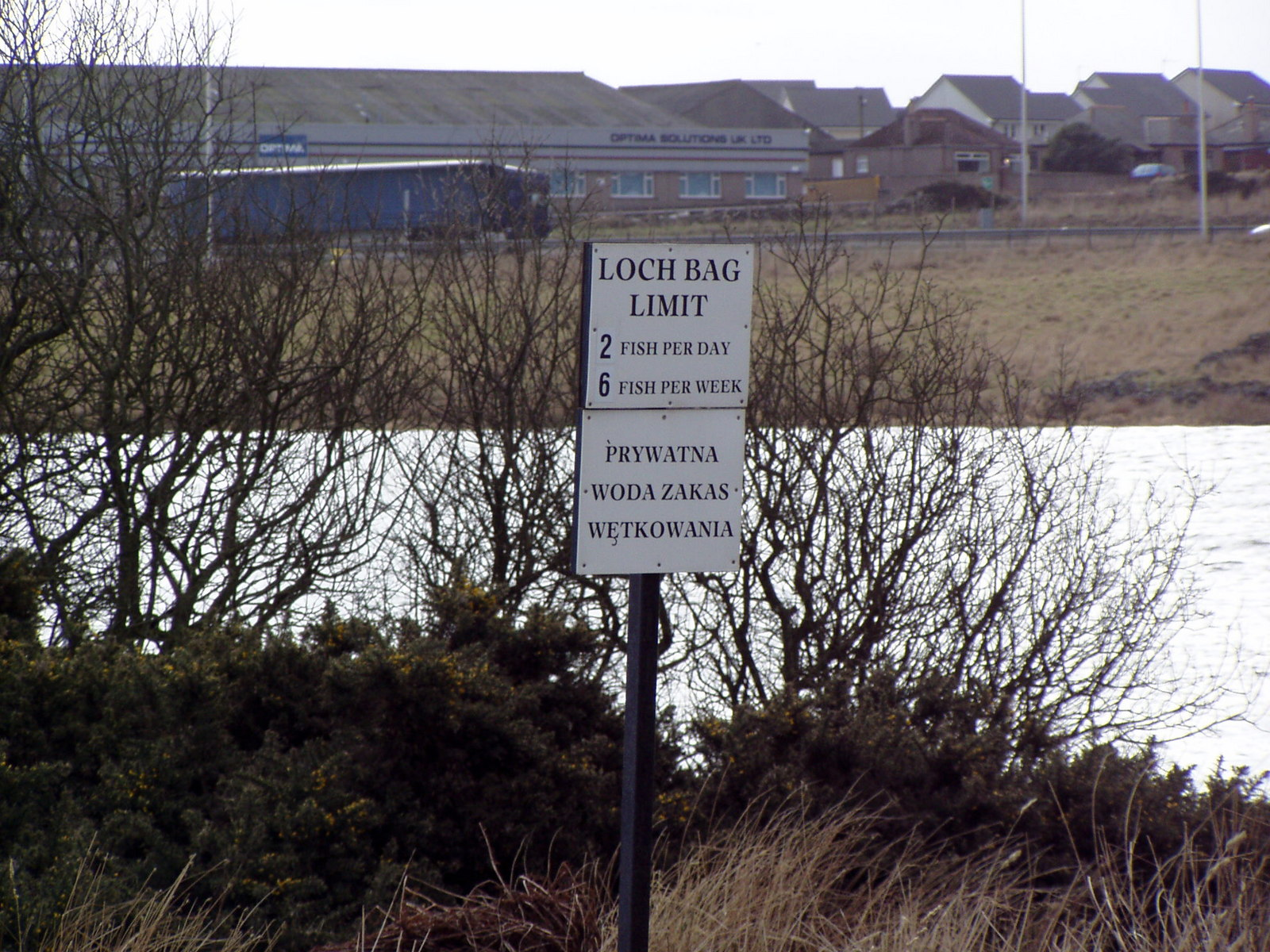
Bilingual sign in Scotland: the English text tells fishers of limits, while the Polish text says "Private water, no fishing."

As noted, there was an increase in Polish workers in Britain in the early twenty-first century. There were incidents of resistance or ethnic discrimination. In 2007, Polish people living in Britain reported 42 "racially motivated violent attacks" against them, compared with 28 in 2004. On 11 July 2012, the Polish Association of Northern Ireland called for action after Polish flags were burned on Eleventh Night bonfires in several locations across Belfast.

On 26 July 2008, The Times published a comment piece by restaurant reviewer Giles Coren, who expressed negative sentiments towards Poles, in part due to his belief that Christian Poles had forced his Jewish ancestors to flee Poland because of anti-Semitic attacks on them after the Holocaust and the Second World War. Coren used the term "Polack" to refer to the Polish diaspora in Britain, arguing that "if England is not the land of milk and honey it appeared to them three or four years ago, then, frankly, they can clear off out of it".

The far-right British National Party (BNP) have expressed anti-Polish sentiments in their political campaigns, and campaigned for a ban on all Polish migrant workers to Britain. The party used an image of a Second World War Spitfire fighter plane, under the slogan "Battle for Britain", during the party's 2009 European Elections campaign. However, the photograph was of a Spitfire belonging to the Polish No.303 Squadron of the Royal Air Force. John Hemming, Liberal Democrat MP for Yardley, Birmingham, ridiculed the BNP for accidentally using an image of Polish aeroplanes in their campaign: "[t]hey have a policy to send Polish people back to Poland – yet they are fronting their latest campaign using this plane."

In January 2014, a Polish man, whose helmet was emblazoned with the flag of Poland, claimed he was attacked by a group of fifteen men outside a pub in Dagenham, London. The victim blamed speeches of then-Conservative Prime Minister David Cameron for causing the attack. During the same month in Belfast, there were seven attacks on Polish homes within ten days; stones and bricks were thrown at the windows.

== Notable people ==
The following people are notable Poles who have lived in the United Kingdom, or notable Britons of Polish descent.

=== Science and technology ===
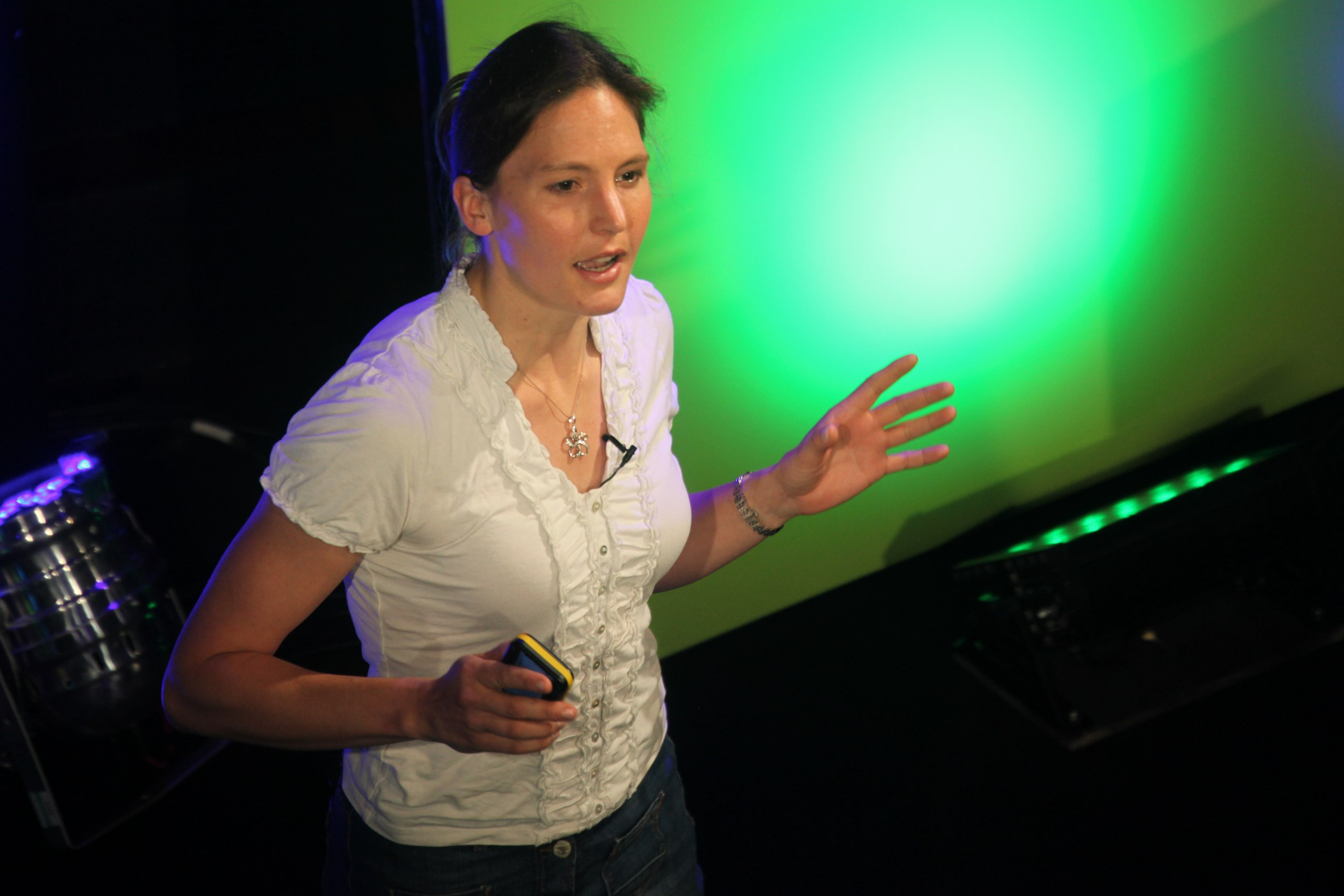
Helen Czerski at Thinking Digital 2012

- Magdalena Zernicka-Goetz – Polish-British developmental biologist. Professor of Mammalian Development and Stem Cell Biology at Cambridge University.
- Zygmunt Bauman (1925–2017) – sociologist
- Sir Leszek Borysiewicz (born 1951) – physician, immunologist and scientific administrator, the 345th Vice-Chancellor of the University of Cambridge.
- Jacob Bronowski (1908–1974) – Polish-Jewish British mathematician, biologist, historian of science, theatre author, poet and inventor. Presenter and writer of the 1973 BBC television documentary series, The Ascent of Man
- Stefan Buczacki (born 1945) – botanist, horticulturalist, broadcaster and writer
- Maria Czaplicka (1884–1921) – cultural anthropologist who is best known for her ethnography of Siberian shamanism.
- Helen Czerski, (born 1978) – physicist and oceanographer
- Eva Frommer (1927–2004) – pioneering child psychiatrist
- Waclaw Korabiewicz (1903–1994) – physician, ethnographer, prolific writer and administrator
- Józef Kosacki (1909–1990) – inventor of the Polish mine detector, first used in Second Battle of El Alamein
- Jerzy Kulczycki (1931–2013) – civil engineer and activist publisher and bookseller in London
- Margaret Lowenfeld (1890–1973) – physician and pioneer of Play therapy
- Bronisław Malinowski (1884–1942) – one of the most important 20th-century anthropologists
- Mark Miodownik (born 1969) – materials scientist, engineer and populariser of science
- Sir Joseph Rotblat (1908–2005) – physicist, participant in the Manhattan Project and Pugwash Conferences on Science and World Affairs, Nobel Peace Prize 1995
- Tomasz Schafernaker – meteorologist and broadcaster
- Hanna Segal (1918–2011) – Kleinian psychoanalyst
- Karol Sikora (born 1948) – oncologist
- Krystyna Skarbek (1908–1952) – SOE agent
- Władysław Świątecki (1895–1944) – invented a bomb-release system, the most successful to be used in the Second World War.
- Paweł Strzelecki (1797–1873) – explorer and geologist who in 1845 also became a British subject.
- Zbigniew Szydlo, (born 1949) – chemist and specialist in alchemy
- Stefan Tyszkiewicz (1894–1976) – automotive pioneer, engineer and inventor
- Halszka Wasilewska (1899–1961) – London-born military officer who developed women's army training in Interbellum Poland
- Helena Rosa Wright (1887–1982) – physician, missionary and pioneer of Contraception
- John Zarnecki (born 1949) – astronomer, past President of the Royal Astronomical Society

=== Written word ===
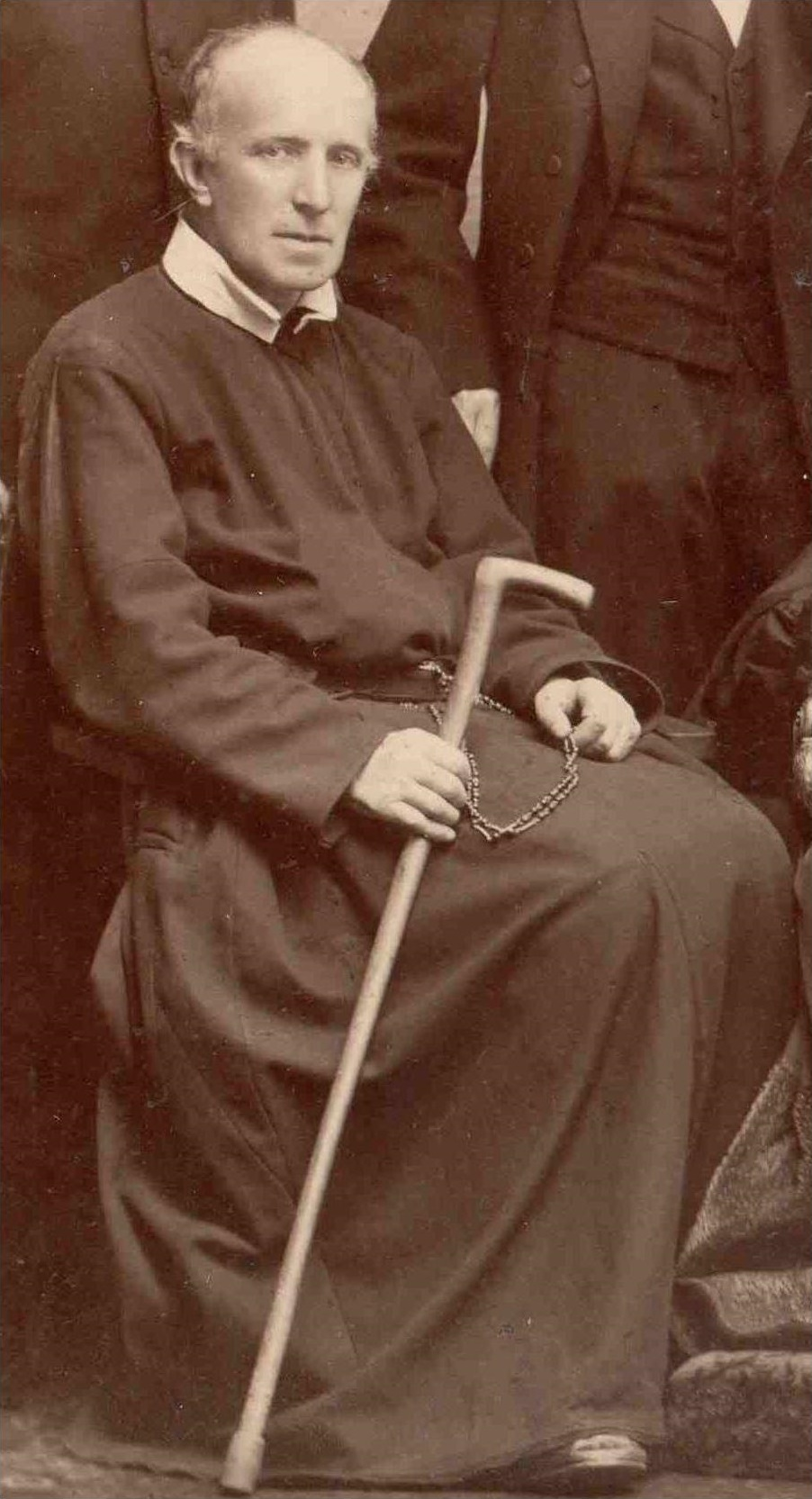
ven. Bernard Łubieński C.Ss.R

Maria Pawlikowska-Jasnorzewska, by Witkacy

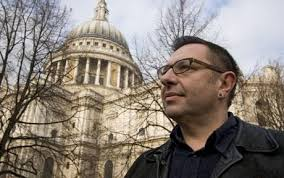
Waldemar Januszczak

- Sebastian Baczkiewicz (born 1962) – playwright
- Janina Bauman (1926–2009) – journalist and writer
- Sophie Brzeska (1873–1925) – writer and muse of Henri Gaudier-Brzeska
- Joseph Conrad (1857–1924) – novelist
- Tony Greenstein, anti-Zionist, anti-Fascist Socialist author and pro-Palestinian activist.
- Jo Hamya – novelist and journalist
- Marian Hemar – songwriter, poet and comedy sketch writer
- Eva Hoffman (born 1945) – writer and psychotherapist
- Józef Jarzębowski (1897–1964) – educationalist, antiquarian and priest, founder of Divine Mercy College, Fawley Court
- Michał Kalecki (1899–1970) – economist and mathematician, 1970 Nobel Prize nominee
- Leszek Kołakowski (1927–2009) – philosopher and historian of ideas, senior research fellow at All Souls College, Oxford, the first winner of the John W. Kluge Prize for Lifetime Achievement in the Humanities
- Stefania Kossowska (1909–2003) – Polish-born journalist, writer, editor and broadcaster.
- Bernard Łubieński (1846–1933) – English-educated Redemptorist priest, archivist, preacher and missionary, (venerable of the Catholic Church)
- Mary Lyschinska (1849–1937) – Kindergarten teacher and writer
- Jozef Mackiewicz (1902–1985) – novelist, younger brother of Stanisław Mackiewicz
- Chris Maslanka (born 1954) – writer, broadcaster specialising in puzzles and problem-solving
- Juliusz Mieroszewski – publicist, translator of Orwell's 1984 into Polish
- Zdzisław Najder (born 1930) – Conrad scholar
- Beata Obertyńska (1898–1980) – poet and writer
- Maria Pawlikowska-Jasnorzewska (1891–1945) – poet and dramatist
- Zbigniew Pelczynski (1925–2021) – political scientist, fellow of Pembroke College, Oxford, founder of School for Leaders in Poland
- Jerzy Peterkiewicz (1916–2007) – writer and academic
- Count Geoffrey Potocki de Montalk (1903–1997) – poet, polemicist and eccentric
- Adam Pragier (1886–1976) – jurist, author, Minister of Information Polish government-in-exile
- Sir Leon Radzinowicz (1906–1999) – academic and criminologist
- Jozef Retinger (1888–1960) – writer, founder of the European Movement and of the Bilderberg Group, friend of Conrad, political adviser, spy
- W. S. Lach-Szyrma (1841–1915) – curate, historian, Science fiction writer and first to coin the word Martian
- Bolesław Taborski (1927–2010) – veteran of Warsaw Uprising, poet, translator into English of John Paul II's dramatic works, literary critic, BBC Polish Section editor
- Adam Zamoyski (born 1949) – historian, ecology campaigner

=== Visual arts ===
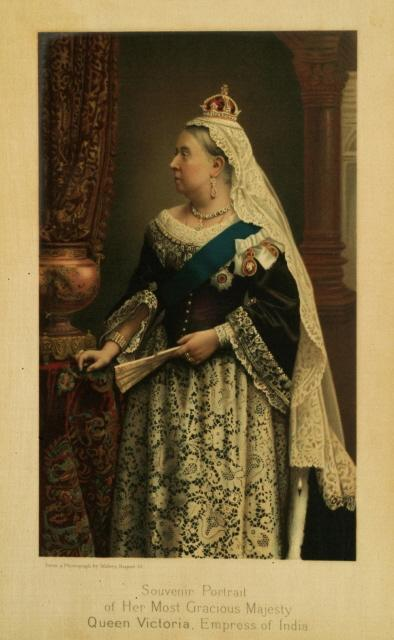
Walery's 1887 photo portrait of Victoria, Empress of India, NPG

- Iwona Blazwick (born 1955) – gallery director and art critic
- Andrzej Ciechanowiecki (1924–2015) – art historian, antiquary, Jermyn Street gallery owner and philanthropist
- Stanisław Frenkiel (1918–2001) – expressionist painter, art historian and academic teacher
- Henryk Gotlib (1890–1966) – painter
- Mateusz Grabowski (1904–1976) – pharmacist, owner of Grabowski Gallery, patron and philanthropist who fostered and donated art to public collections
- Waldemar Januszczak (born 1954) – architecture and art critic
- Stanislawa de Karlowska (1876–1952) – painter and member of the Camden Town Group
- Robert Koenig (1951–2023) – sculptor
- Adam Kossowski (1905–1986) – painter
- Stefan Knapp (1921–1996) – painter, sculptor and multi-media artist
- Andrzej Krauze (born 1947) – cartoonist, illustrator, painter and poster designer
- Mieczysław Lubelski (1886–1965) – sculptor, ceramicist, designer, author of Polish War Memorial, RAF Northolt
- Stanisław Julian Ostroróg (1834–90) – Photographer to the Queen. (He and his son, below, were both known as Walery.) Sitters included Victor Hugo and Queen Victoria.
- Stanisław Julian Ignacy Ostroróg (1863–1935) – son of Stanisław Julian Ostroróg, also a portrait photographer. Sitters included Oscar Wilde.
- Aniela Pawlikowska (1901–1980) – artist, book illustrator and society painter in Britain
- Jan Pieńkowski (born 1936) – children's book illustrator
- Janina Ramirez (born 1980) – art and cultural historian and TV presenter
- Jasia Reichardt (born 1933) – art curator, critic, gallery director and historian
- Franciszka Themerson (1907–1988) – painter, filmmaker, book illustrator and stage designer
- Feliks Topolski (1907–1989) – draughtsman, cartoonist, illustrator and designer, expressionist painter
- Jerzy Zarnecki CBE, FBA, FSA(1915–2008) - Professor of the History of Art
- Marek Zulawski (1908–1985) – painter and art theorist

=== Music ===
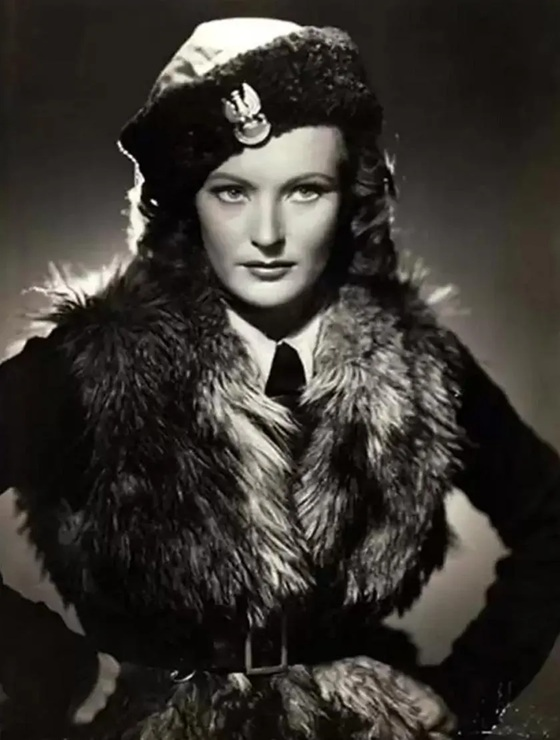
Irena Anders, as Renata Bogdanska, 1940s

- Irena Anders (aka Renata Bogdańska) – singer, actress, Poland's "answer to Vera Lynn", and wife of General Anders
- Mark Brzezicki – drummer, longstanding member of Big Country
- Katy Carr – musician, songwriter and aviator
- Frédéric Chopin – virtuoso pianist and composer a year before his death, toured England and Scotland in 1848, inspired by his Scottish pupil, Jane Stirling
- Simon Cowell – English television personality, entrepreneur, music producer and record executive
- Chris Dreja – guitarist with The Yardbirds
- Janick Gers – guitarist in Iron Maiden
- Ida Haendel (1928–2020) – virtuoso violinist awarded CBE
- Josef Hassid – violin prodigy who came to study in England
- J. J. Jeczalik – musician
- Paul Kletzki (1900–1973) – Polish-born international conductor associated with the Liverpool Philharmonic Orchestra
- Alfred Orda – operatic baritone
- Andrzej Panufnik – orchestral conductor and composer
- Roxanna Panufnik – composer daughter of Andrzej
- Marjan Rawicz – virtuoso pianist, half of the popular Piano duo, Rawicz and Landauer
- Arthur Rubinstein (1887–1982) – pianist and honorary KBE
- Janek Schaefer – sound artist
- Halina Czerny-Stefańska – pianist, juror of the Leeds International Piano Competition, emerged as the real pianist of the EMI Dinu Lipatti recording mix-up
- Leopold Stokowski – orchestral conductor
- Maria Szymanowska – virtuoso pianist and composer, gave concerts in England in 1818
- André Tchaikowsky (1935–1982) – pianist, composer. He left his skull to the Royal Shakespeare Company
- Chris Urbanowicz – guitar player in Editors
- Tracey Ullman – comedian, actor and singer
- Henryk Wieniawski – violinist and composer played with the Beethoven Quartet Society in London

=== Performing arts ===
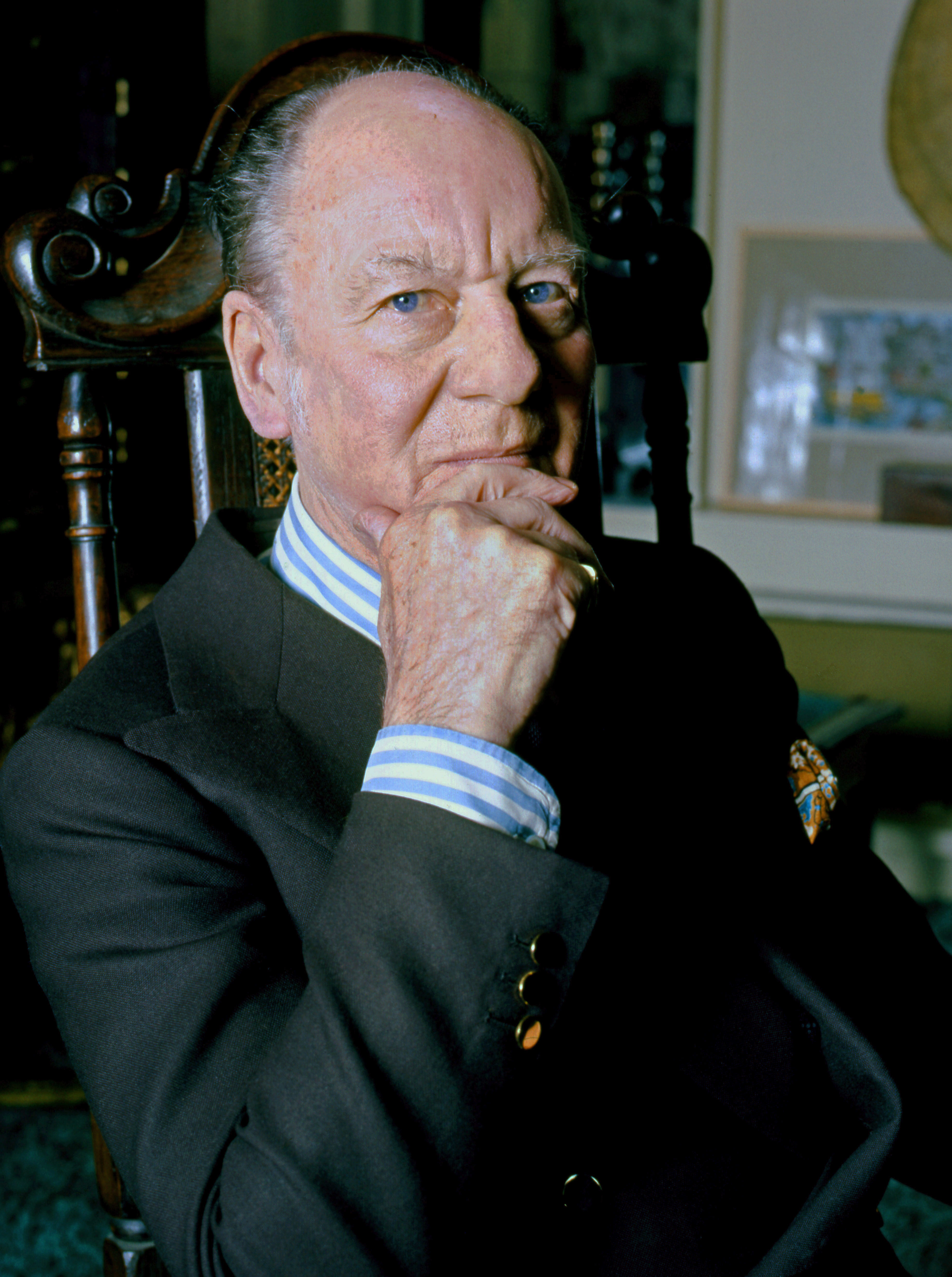
Sir John Gielgud, 1973, by Allan Warren

- Kathryn Apanowicz – actor
- Ella Balinska – actress
- Jan Herman Cukiertort (1842–1888) – chess grandmaster
- Daniela Denby-Ashe (born Pszkit) – actor
- Robert Donat – actor
- Anulka Dziubinska – actor, model
- Coky Giedroyc – director
- Mel Giedroyc – actor, comedian, one half of 'Mel and Sue'
- Sir John Gielgud – actor, director
- Maina Gielgud – ballet dancer
- Val Gielgud – pioneer of radio drama
- Stefan Golaszewski – comedian
- Ziggy Heath – actor
- Paul Heiney (born Wisniewski) – son of a Polish serviceman) journalist, TV personality and farmer
- Stanislas Idzikowski (1894–1977) – Ballet dancer, with Anna Pavlova and the Ballets Russes and esteemed ballet master
- Marek Kanievska – director
- Mark Kielesz-Levine – television journalist and presenter
- Richard Kwietniowski – director, screenwriter
- Rula Lenska – actor
- Kasia Madera – newsreader
- Paweł Pawlikowski – Polish filmmaker
- Ingrid Pitt- actress, daughter of a Polish mother
- Anna Ptaszynski – comedian, host of No Such Thing as a Fish education/comedy podcast
- Ida Schuster – actor
- Vladek Sheybal (1923–1992) – film and TV actor and director
- Peter Serafinowicz – comedian
- Michael Winner (1935–2013) – son of a Polish mother, film director, producer, food critic

=== Politics ===
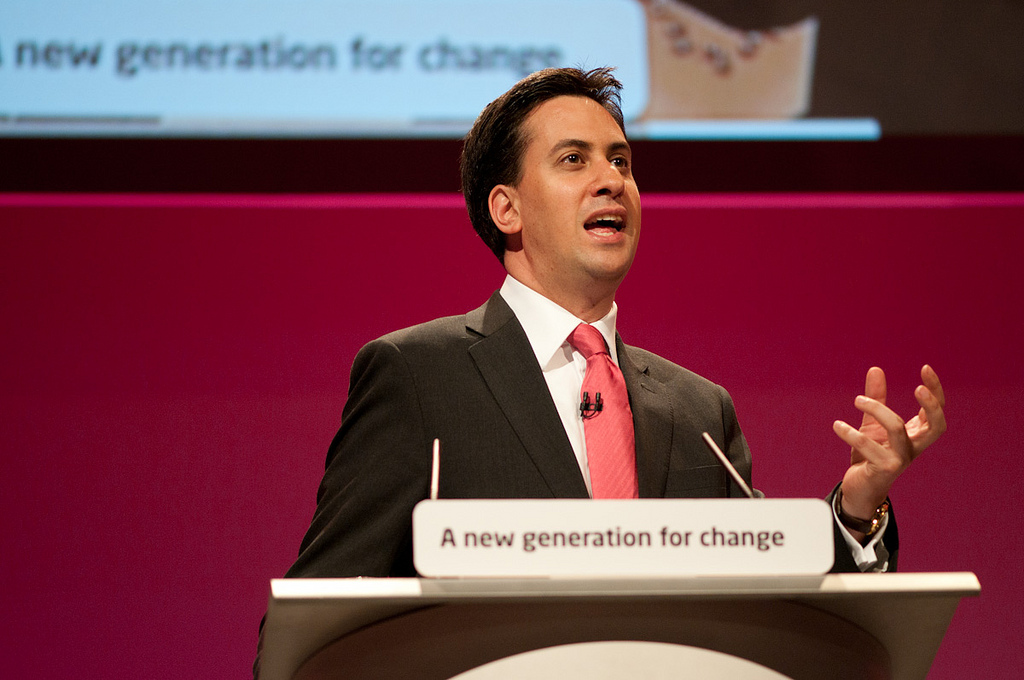
Ed Miliband as leader at Labour Party conference, 2010

- Cnut – (also known as Cnut the Great and Canute) the maternal grandson of Mieszko I, was King of England from 1016, King of Denmark from 1018, and King of Norway from 1028 until his death in 1035
- Simon Danczuk – ex Labour MP for Rochdale
- Tomasz Arciszewski – third Prime Minister of Polish government-in-exile and the last to have international recognition
- Adam Ciołkosz – with wife, Lidia, leading light of the Polish Socialist Party for several decades in Poland and in UK exile
- Daniel Kawczynski – Conservative MP for Shrewsbury and Atcham, came to the UK in 1978
- Stanisław Mackiewicz (1896–1966) (older brother of Jozef Mackiewicz) – foremost political journalist who served as exiled Prime Minister (1955–56) before returning to Poland
- Stanislaw Mikolajczyk – second Prime Minister of Polish government-in-exile
- David Miliband – former Foreign Secretary, whose mother was born in Poland
- Ed Miliband – former leader of the Labour Party, whose mother was born in Poland
- Rosena Allin-Khan (born 1977) – medical practitioner and Labour Party MP for Tooting in London
- Walery Mroczkowski (1840–1889) – anarchist follower of Mikhail Bakunin
- Julian Ursyn Niemcewicz – political theorist, diplomat, prolific writer
- Leon Walerian Ostroróg (1867–1932) – international jurist, specialising in Islamic Law, delegate to Paris Peace Conference, 1919
- Józef Piłsudski – statesman and marshal of Polish Armed Forces stayed in London as an independence activist early in his career
- Adam Pragier – leading socialist and political writer, Information minister in the Polish government-in-exile
- Wladyslaw Raczkiewicz – Polish Head of State-in-exile (President) 1939–1947
- Edward Bernard Raczyński – aristocrat, diplomat, writer, politician and President of Poland in exile (between 1979 and 1986)
- Jozef Retinger (1888–1960) – Chief political adviser to the Polish government-in-exile, co-founder of the Bilderberg Group and of the European Movement
- Jacek Rostowski – economist and politician who served as Minister of Finance and Deputy Prime Minister of the Republic of Poland
- Wladyslaw Sikorski – first Prime Minister of Polish government-in-exile who died in mysterious circumstances in an air crash off Gibraltar
- Radosław Sikorski (born 1963) – temporary UK citizen, Polish minister of Foreign Affairs
- Felicjan Sławoj Składkowski – physician, Divisional general and last Prime Minister of the Second Republic of Poland
- Edward Szczepanik (1915–2005) – economist and final prime minister of the Polish government-in-exile
- Stefan Terlezki (1927–2006) – former Cardiff City Councillor, and Conservative MP for Cardiff West from 1983 to 1987 (born in Oleshiw: then in Poland; after 1945 in Western Ukraine)
- Walery Antoni Wróblewski (1836–1908) – politician, January Uprising commander and Communard
- Władysław Zamoyski (1803–1868) – Czartoryski's diplomat in London and general in the Crimean War
- Szmul Zygielbojm – Jewish-Polish socialist politician, Bund leader, and member of the National Council of the Polish Government in Exile. He committed suicide to protest the indifference of the Allied governments in the face of the Holocaust.

=== Business ===
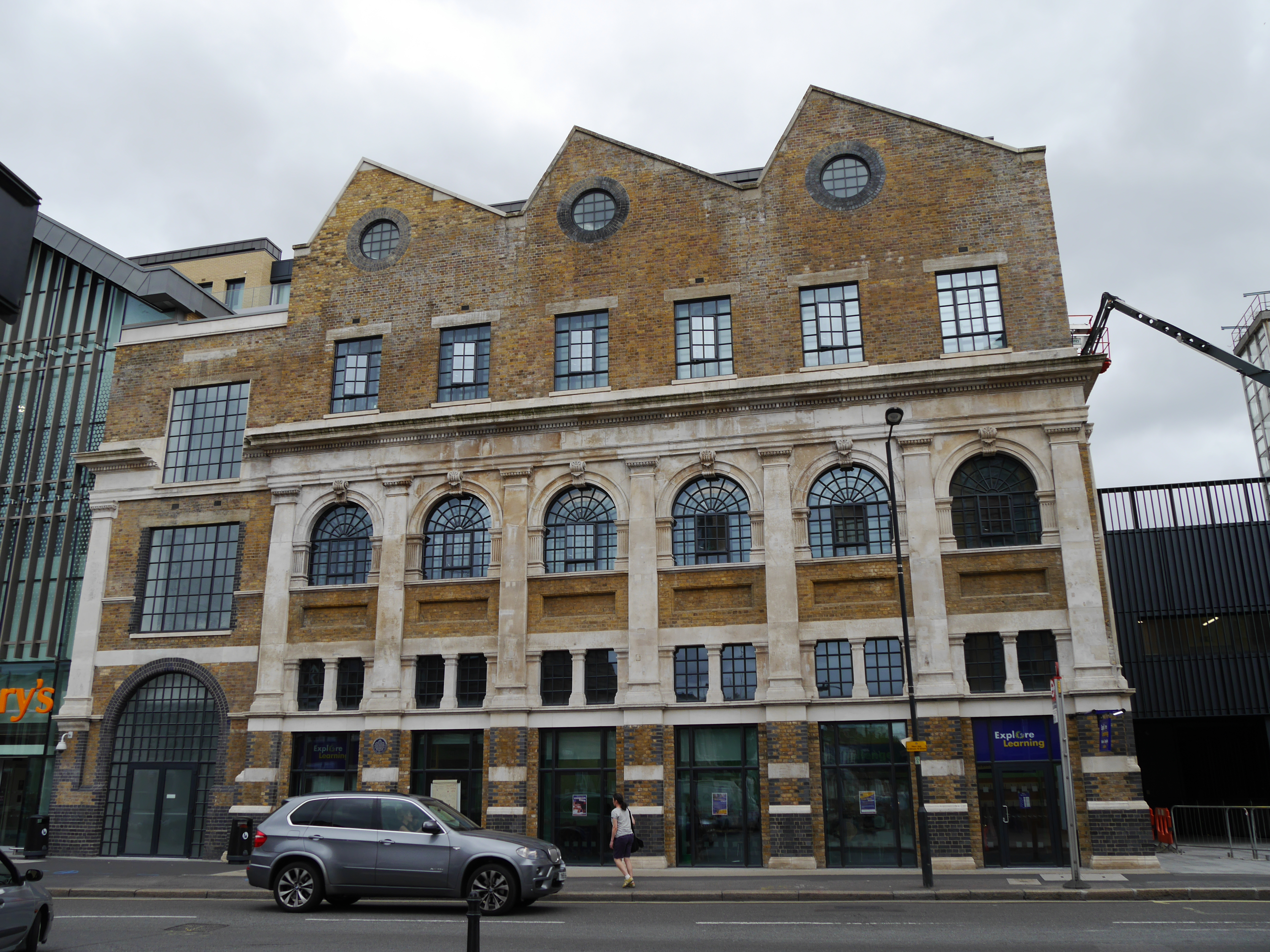
Lowenfeld's Kops Brewery, Fulham

- Jack Cohen (1898–1979) – founder of Tesco, was the son of Polish Jewish immigrants.
- Mateusz Bronisław Grabowski (1904–1976) – pharmacist from Wilno, who became a philanthropist to the arts and academic research
- Nicola Horlick (born 1960) – investment fund manager dubbed 'Superwoman', is half Polish.
- Henry Lowenfeld (1859–1931) – entrepreneur and theatrical impresario who introduced non-alcoholic beer to Fulham
- Michael Marks (Michał Marks) (c. 1859–1907) – one of two co-founders of the retail chain, Marks & Spencer
- Peter Rachman (1919–1962) – notorious landlord whose malpractice gained an entry in the Oxford English Dictionary
- John J. Studzinski (born 1956) – American-British banker and philanthropist of Polish descent

=== Sport ===
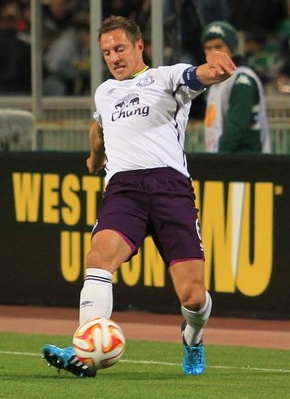
Phil Jagielka playing for Everton, 2014

- Paweł Abbott – former Poland under-21 international footballer, born and raised in York
- Konrad Bartelski – Alpine ski racer
- Michael Bisping – mixed martial artist
- Matty Cash – Poland international footballer
- Andy Drzewiecki – former weightlifter
- Carl Froch – professional boxer and two-time former WBC Super Middleweight Champion
- Lisa Dobriskey – British middle distance athlete
- Mickey Duff – Polish-born boxer and promoter
- Divina Galica – skier and racing driver
- Robert Grabarz – high-jumper
- Phil Jagielka – England international footballer
- Andrew Johnson – former England international footballer
- Lukas Jutkiewicz – footballer
- Paul Konchesky – former England international footballer
- Craig Kopczak – rugby league player
- Dick Krzywicki – former Wales international footballer
- Anthony Malarczyk – former cyclist
- Eddie Niedzwiecki – former Wales international footballer
- Mikołaj Olędzki – England international rugby league player
- Anton Otulakowski – former footballer
- Maxi Oyedele – professional footballer
- Kris Radlinski – former Wigan Warriors and Great Britain rugby league player
- Kevin Rutkiewicz – footballer
- Kevin Spiolek – former darts player
- Alex Szostak – rugby league player
- James Tarkowski – footballer
- Daniel Topolski – Oxford University rowing coach and TV pundit

=== Scottish connection ===
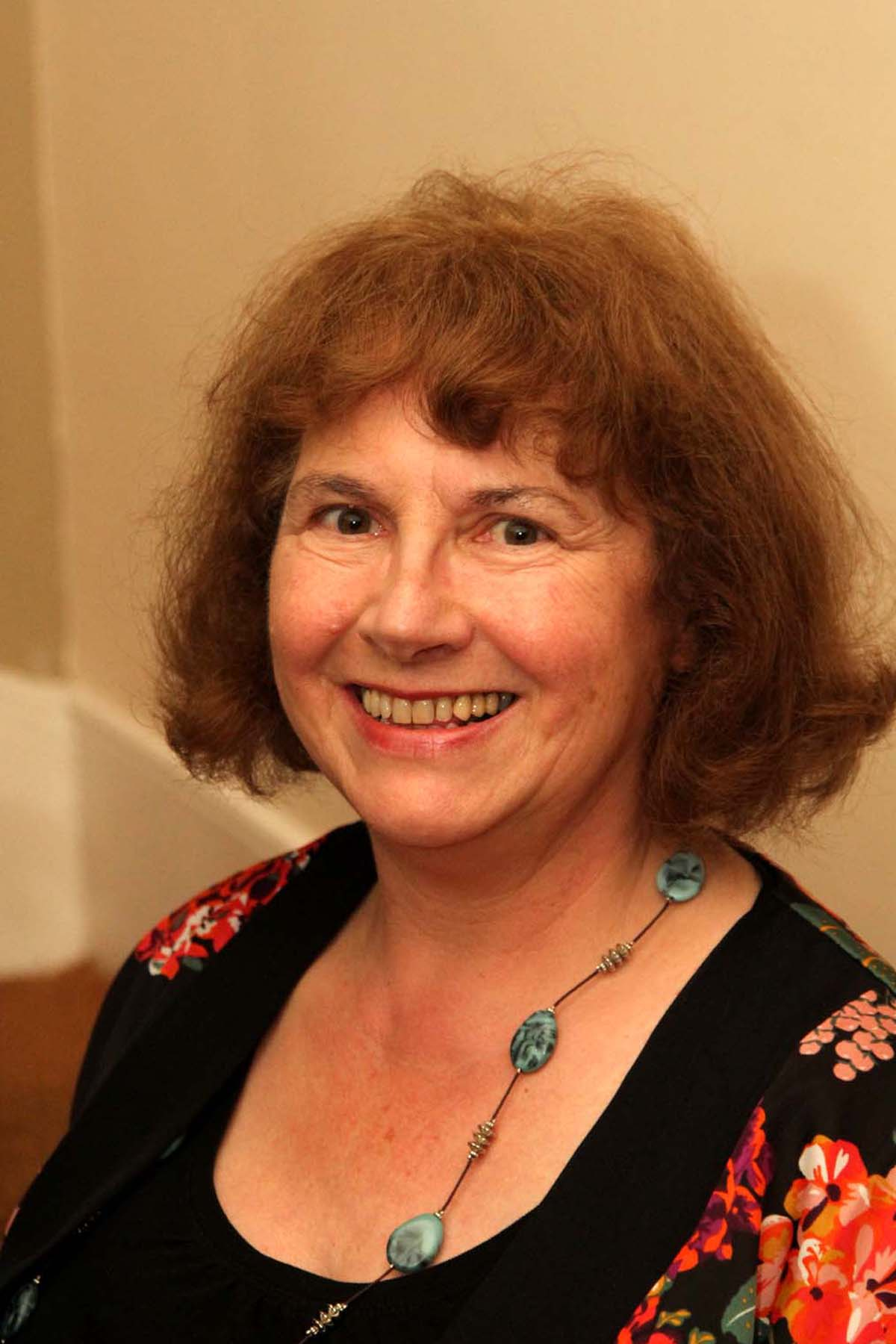
Czerkawska

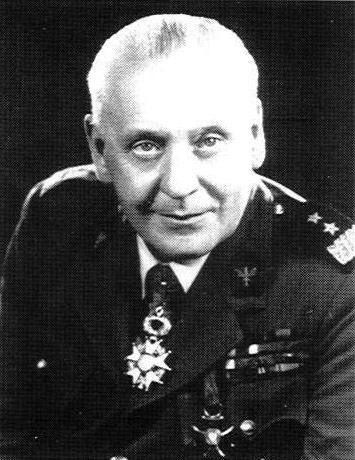
Gen. Maczek

- Catherine Czerkawska (born 1950) – poet, novelist, playwright
- Anna Dominiczak DBE FRCP FRSE FAHA FMedSci - professor of Medicine
- James Gimzewski – professor of chemistry, UCLA
- Janusz Jankowski – physician, scientist and academic administrator
- Mark Lazarowicz – Labour and Co-operative MP for Edinburgh North and Leith, whose father was Polish
- Gerald Lepkowski – actor, his father was Polish.
- Denis MacShane (né Matyjaszek) – former Minister for Europe, whose father was Polish
- Stanisław Maczek (1892–1994) – tank commander, much-decorated lieutenant-general
- Marianna Palka – screenwriter
- Witold Rybczynski (born 1943) – Canadian architect
- Charles Edward Stuart – "Bonny Prince Charlie", Jacobite pretender to thrones of England, Scotland, and Ireland (half-Polish great-grandson of Polish King John III Sobieski)
- Richard Wawro – landscape painter

== See also ==
- Poland–United Kingdom relations
- Great Polish Map of Scotland
- Polish diaspora
- Scottish migration to Poland, 15th–18th centuries
- Polish Institute and Sikorski Museum
- World War II Behind Closed Doors: Stalin, the Nazis and the West
