= Walery (name) =

- Gender: Male

Origin
- Origin: Latin nomen Valerius
- Region of origin: Italy

Walery is a Polish given name.

== People with the name ==
- Walery Rzewuski (1837-1888), Polish portrait photographer and alderman of Kraków
- Walery Mroczkowski (1840-1889), insurgent, anarcho-activist and photographer aka "Valerien Ostroga"
- Walery Cyryl Amrogowicz (1863–1931), Polish numismatist and philanthropist
- Walery Eljasz-Radzikowski (1841–1905), Polish painter and photographer
- Walery Jaworski (1849–1924), Polish pioneer of gastroenterology
- Walery Roman (1877–1952), Polish lawyer and politician
- Walery Sławek (1879–1939), Polish politician and activist
- Stanisław Julian Ostroróg (1830–1890), an expatriate Polish photographer who used "Walery" as a business name
- Stanisław Julian Ignacy Ostroróg (1863–1929), Ostoróg's son, also known as "Walery", himself a photographer, who used his father's professional name and other pseudonyms based on "Walery"

== See also ==
- Walery, Masovian Voivodeship, a village in Poland
