= Stanisław Julian Ignacy Ostroróg =

Polish photographer (1863–1929)

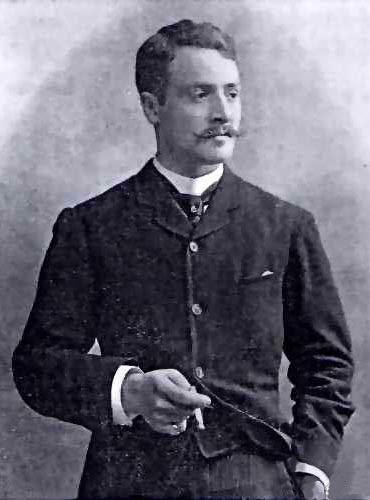
- Stanisław Ostroróg, the younger, circa 1890
- Born: 12 September 1863; London, England, United Kingdom of Great Britain and Ireland
- Died: 24 February 1929 (aged 65); Paris, French Third Republic
- Other names: Walery, Lucien Waléry, Laryew, Lucien, Stanislas Valery
- Occupation: Photographer
- Years active: 1890–1929
- Era: Belle Époque and 1920s
- Known for: Pioneer in photography
- Spouse: Audrey Fowke
- Parent(s): Count Stanisław Julian Ostroróg and Teodozja Waleria Gwozdecka
- Relatives: Leon Walerian Ostroróg, Stanislas Ostroróg, Gustaw Gwozdecki

Stanisław Julian Ignacy Ostroróg (also known as Walery, Stanislas Waléry, Lucien Waléry, and Laryew, born 12 September 1863 – 24 February 1929) was a Polish photographer active in London and Paris between 1890 and 1929. After inheriting his father's name and photographic studio in London, he continued with portraiture for about a decade until the turn of the century when he moved definitively to Paris. There he achieved celebrity as an innovator and accomplished photographer of cabaret stars and of the female form.

== Background ==
He was born on 12 September 1863 in London into a family of political emigrants of Polish noble descent. He was the eldest child of Count Stanisław Julian Ostroróg, a British subject and his Polish wife, Teodozja Waleria, née Gwozdecka. His father was born in the Russian Partition of what had once been the Polish–Lithuanian Commonwealth, not long after the November uprising of 1830 which led to severe repression of the insurgents, of which the family had been part. While Ostroróg senior served as an officer in the Imperial Guard in the Crimean War, he came into contact with a British General and decided to switch sides, but after a failed attempt to join the British forces, apparently on health grounds, he was directed to the Polish cavalry division of the Ottoman Army, headed by General Zamoyski, whose adjutant he became in the rank of colonel. After the war he settled in London and was granted citizenship in 1862 and married. After the birth of Stanisław junior, the family headed to Marseille to set up a photographic studio. In 1866 the family were back in Warsaw, but the following year after the death of the second son, they left for Paris in time for the birth of the third son, Leon, and where Ostroróg senior resumed his successful photographic career until 1878 when his creditor's financial difficulties forced him to give up trading and the family moved back to London in 1880. He opened a Regent Street studio where Stanisław junior was eventually to join his father.

== Early years ==
Although born in England, Stanisław junior was sent to Poland, presumably to relatives, to learn Polish while his parents returned to France where his father developed his photographic career. In 1871, during the Paris Commune, he was sent there for his schooling. In that period, his parents divorced and his father remarried. At around 18 years of age and following family tradition, he obtained a commission in the army, only this time in the Royal Artillery at Woolwich. This was short-lived as he evinced an interest in his father's business and resigned from the army. At his father's insistence, he went to Paris for two years to study the techniques of photography, including portraiture. He returned to England to rejoin his father, who by then was enjoying great success and found he was not needed in the studio and so accepted a proposal to go to Mexico for a year helping in the construction of a railway and opening up a colony. He spent the next few years travelling with a camera and survey instruments in Africa, to places like Natal and Zululand. The sudden death of his father from an aneurism brought him back to London, where he took over the management of his father's studio.

== Photographic career ==
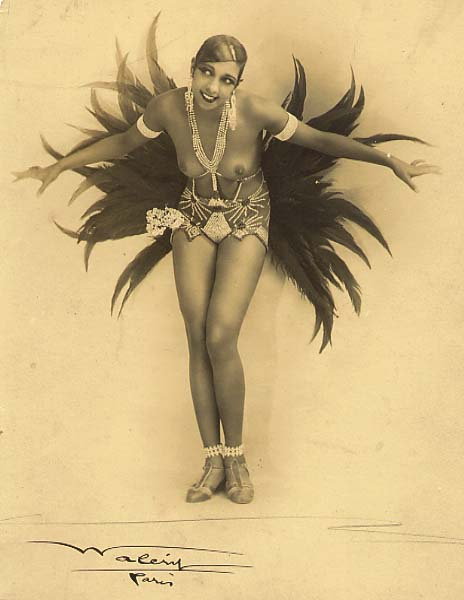
Josephine Baker

Ostroróg junior was inspired to learn photographic techniques by his photographer father. He had worked briefly alongside him in the London studio named after his mother, Walery Ltd. After his father's death, however, he found the business side a struggle and soon went into partnership with the ambitious young English theatrical photographer, Alfred Ellis (1854–1930) and began trading as Ellis & Walery from new premises in Baker Street until 1908. For four years between 1890 and 1894 he worked on developing a Heliogravure process for the reproduction of art, although that did not produce the results he desired until much later in Paris. In the meantime he continued with portraits of society people including royalty as his father had done earlier. The NPG records that Walery, father and son, is associated with 197 portraits, including Dan Leno and King George V, while Ellis has 180 portraits to his name, mainly of "theatrical royalty". They appear to have kept their authorship and sitters separate, while sharing studio facilities.

Around 1900, Stanisław Ostroróg opened a Paris studio on his own account, in his father's former premises, at 9bis rue de Londres, where initially he specialized in theatre and cabaret artists including Mata Hari, and produced Cabinet cards. As his French business prospered he gave up his London interest. In the 1920s he focused on Art Photography and experimented with the figure of the model, entirely eschewing aspects of background and other perquisites. During this period he used the pseudonym "Laryew" and under that name produced a book of 100 heliogravures, entitled Nus – Cent Photographies Originales. He achieved greatest acclaim with his series of photographs of Josephine Baker, published in 1926. He also produced studies of the female nude destined for anatomy and art students.

== Confusions arising from the name "Walery" ==
There are probably three areas of confusion as to the name "Walery". The first is because there was another Polish photographer with the given name "Walery", the quite distinct Walery Mroczkowski working under the pseudonym "Walery Ostroga" in Menton and in Trouville-sur-Mer, where Parisians and other wealthy people went on holiday, so could be forgiven for mixing up the names. Secondly, the confusion has grown further because the younger Ostroróg used several pseudonyms, among them, "Lucien Waléry" or "Stanislas Walery", "Laryew" or "Yrelaw" to produce "erotica" in Paris in the period 1900–1929. Thirdly, there is thematic confusion in the French national library in that subjects under "Walery" comprise portraits for the Société de géographie, the Geographical Society of France as well as playbills for the Folies Bergère, while the Bibliothèque interuniversitaire de santé—French Inter-university Library for health—contains 64 portraits of eminent medical doctors, also catalogued under "Waléry".

It is assumed by some that Lucien Waléry was not the younger Count Ostroróg, but a different photographer altogether. Others, like the photographic historian, Zygmunt Wielowiejski, and the French national library, regard "Lucien" as the younger Count Ostroróg working under yet another pseudonym, probably to distance himself from his more mainstream work.

=== False Walery ===
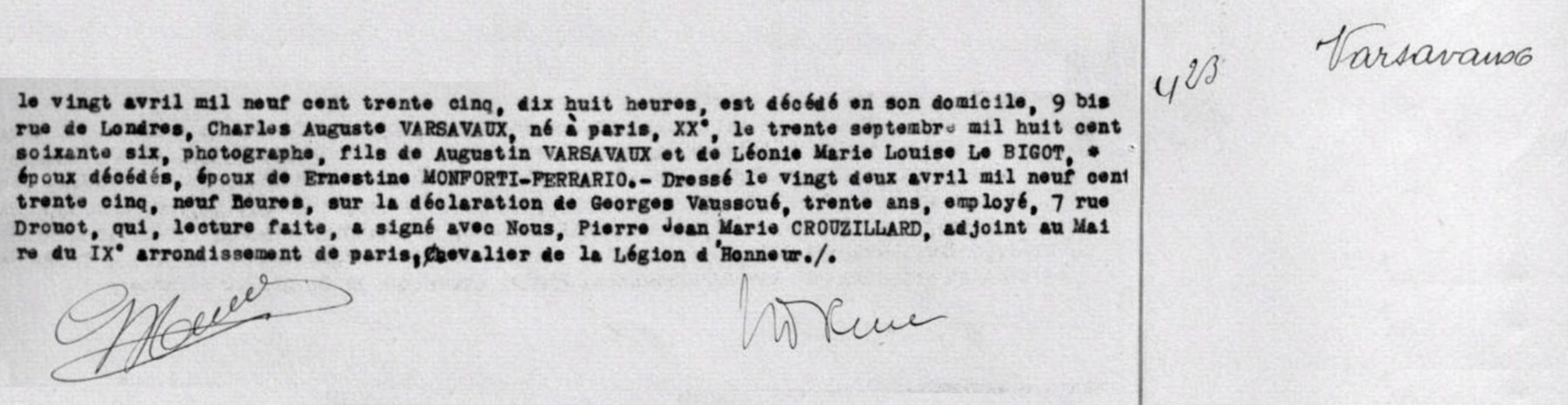
Death certificate of Charles Auguste Varsavaux, photographer at 9bis rue de Londres in the 9th arrondissement of Paris, who died at the address on 20 April 1935, (Paris Archives). This address happens to be the original photographic studio of Count Stanisław Julian Ostroróg, senior (1830–1890) and later the studio of his son.

Finally, the "Lucien" and "Waléry" pseudonyms became associated with the name of "Charles Auguste Varsavaux" (1866–1935), another French photographer, who took over the former Walery premises in rue de Londres after Ostroróg died in 1929. There is no suggestion that the two men ever cooperated. The Bibliothèque nationale de France cautions against confusing Ostroróg junior with Lucien Varsavaux, dit Walery. Warsavaux also produced erotica, presumably to cash in on the notoriety of the address and himself died on 20 April 1935, but there remains the outside possibility that his was yet another pseudonym of Ostroróg junior, playing on the last name's association with "Warsaw". The insinuation by Varsavaux has led some to believe that Ostroróg himself died in 1935. However, an alleged Varsavaux descendant, among others, dispute this theory, as does the Varsavaux death certificate, pictured here.

== Private life ==
He married Joyce Audrey Rede Fowke (1877–1930), a granddaughter of Sir Henry Cole, in 1897 in Chelsea. They had four children, Francis who died in infancy, Stanislaus John, Joyce and Sally. Stanisław Julian Ignacy Ostroróg died in Paris on 22 February 1929. His nephew (younger brother Leon's son) and namesake, Stanislas Ostroróg, became a French diplomat and ambassador to Dublin and India among other postings.

== Museum and private collections ==
In 2005, the National Portrait Gallery, London, mounted an exhibition entitled "Victorian Women", featuring the work of Walery, father and son. In Paris the Musée d'Orsay holds 72 items by "Walery", mostly children, family groups and politicians and artists.

== Gallery ==
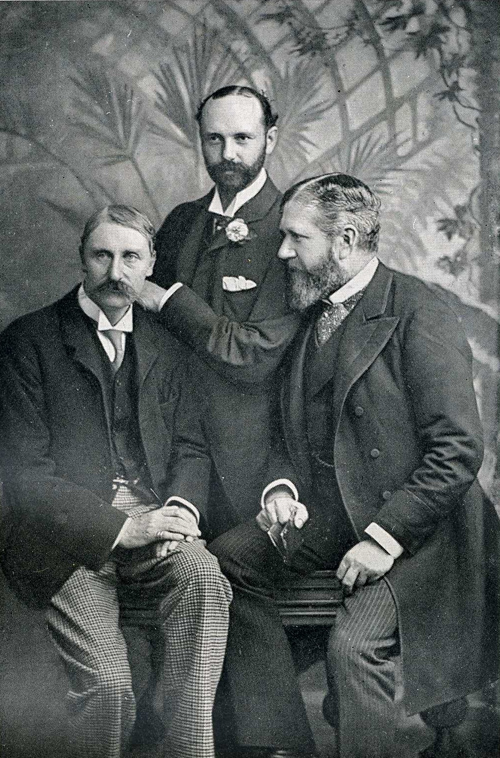
Alfred Cellier, H J Leslie, B C Stephenson

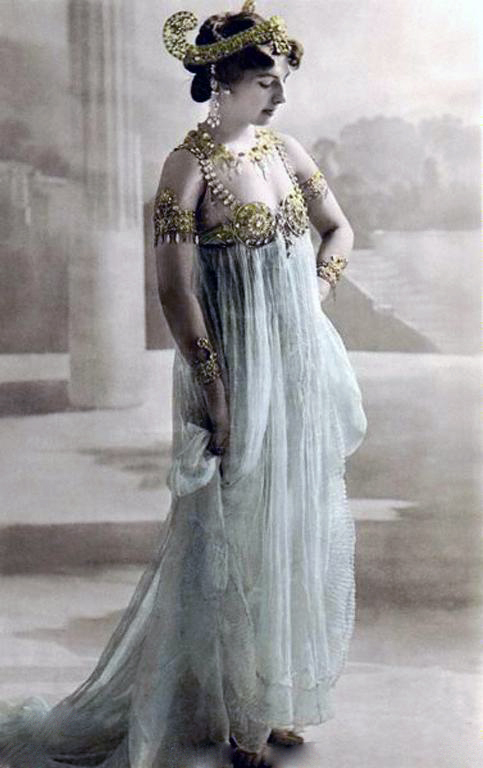
Mata Hari

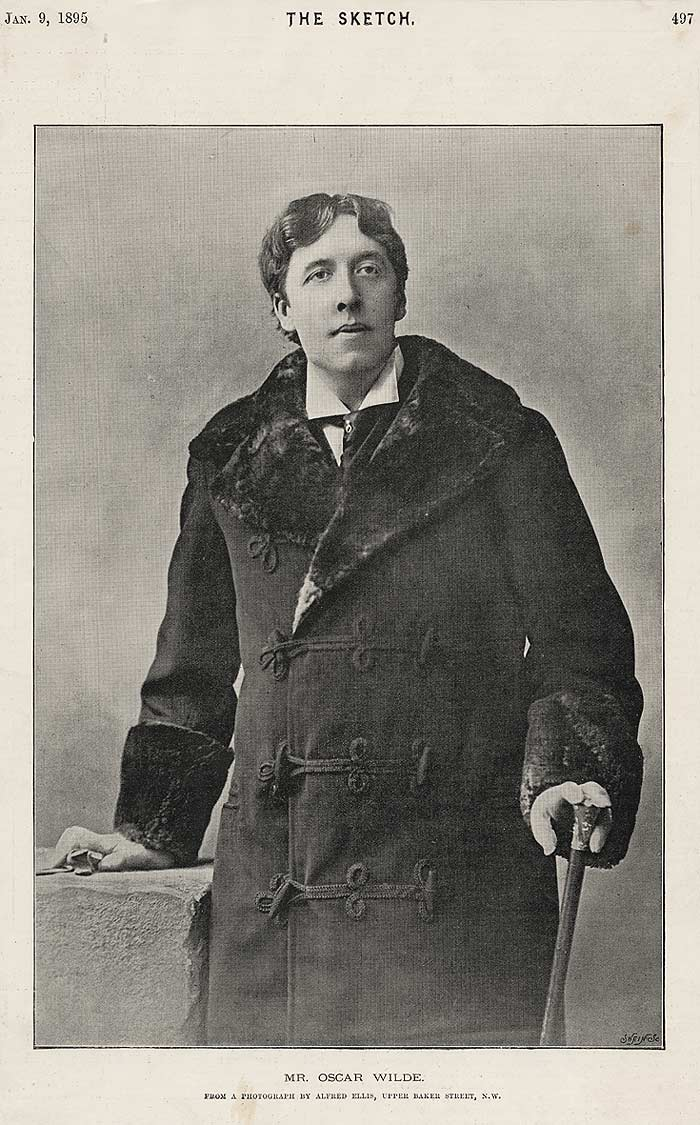
Oscar Wilde in 1892

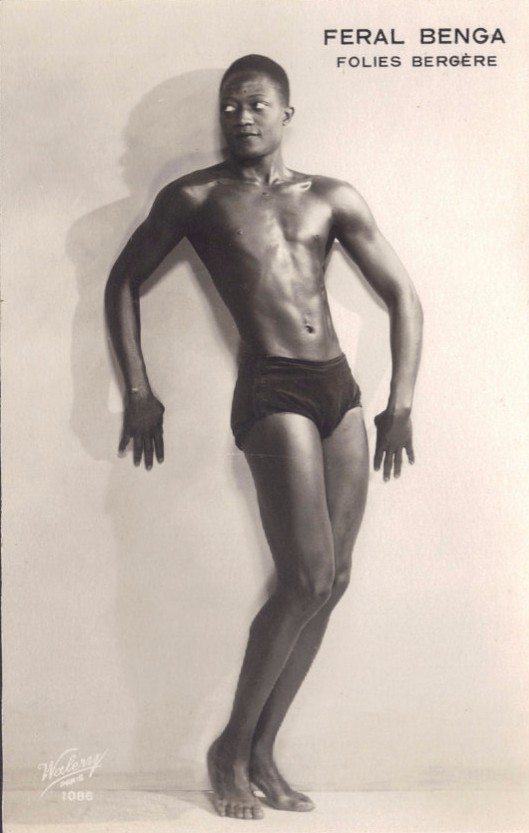
Postcard of Féral Benga at the Folies Bergère

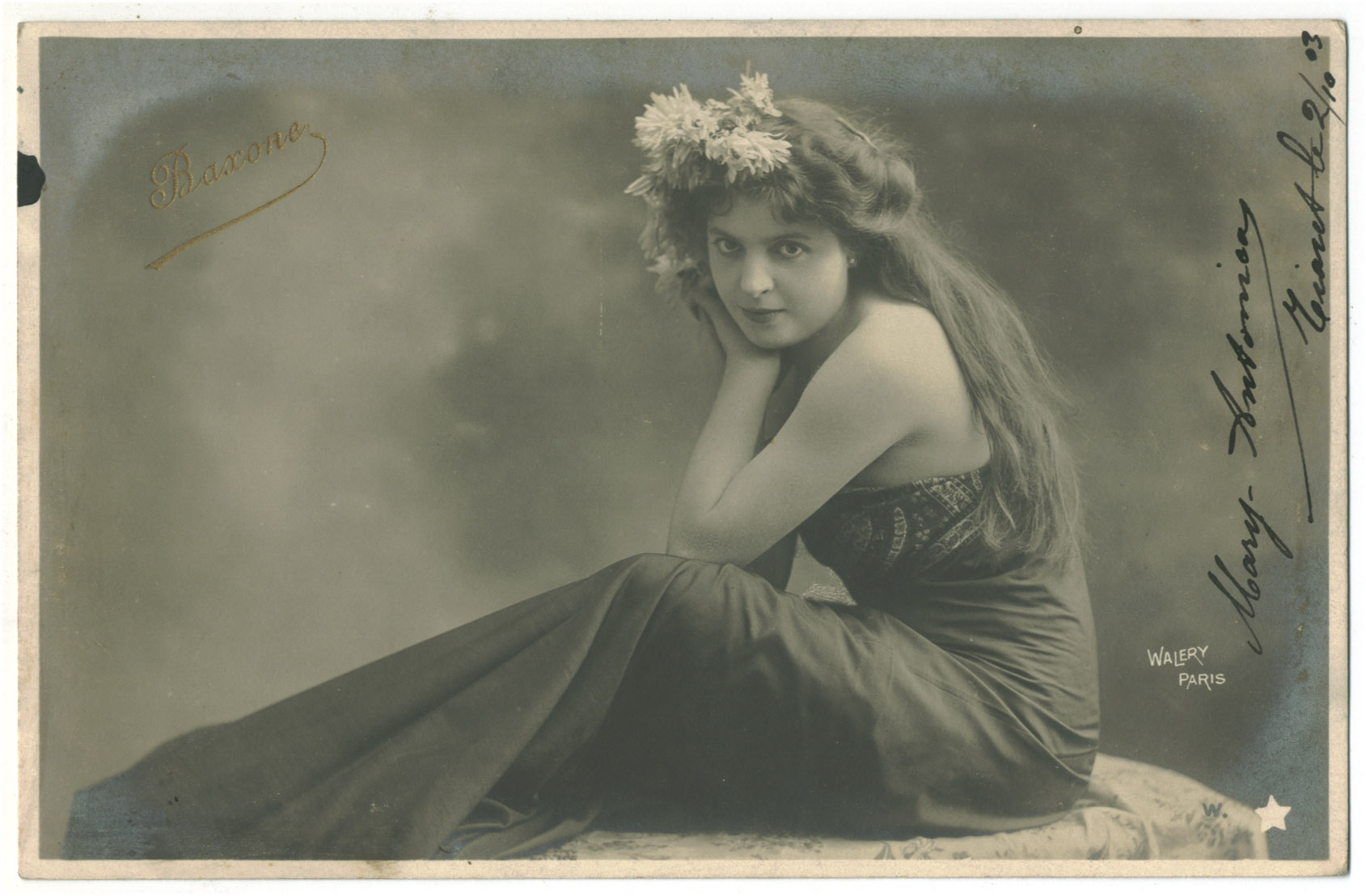
BAXONE, Ellen W Étoile

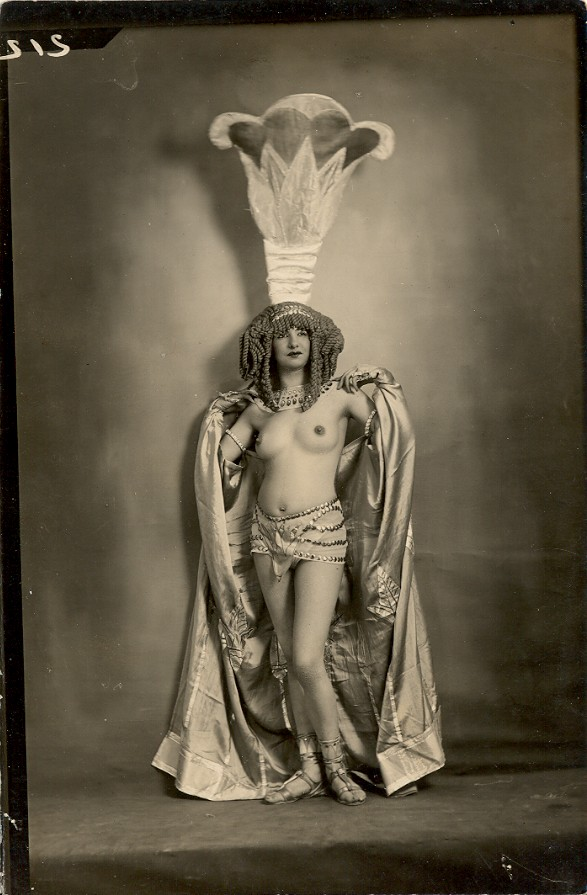
Woman with headdress,
circa 1928

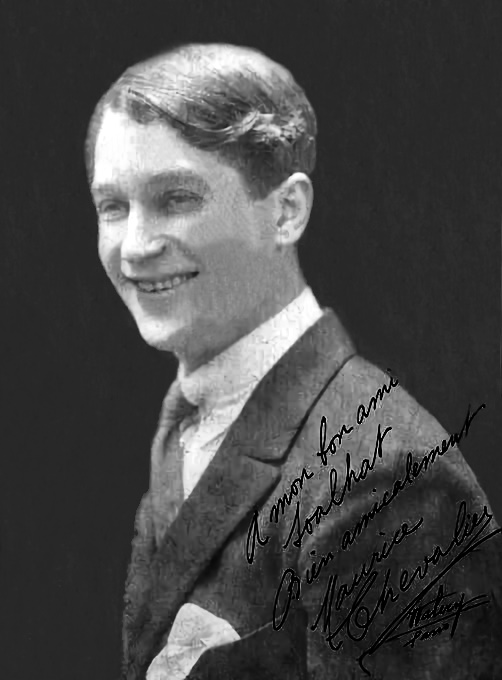
Maurice Chevalier 1920s

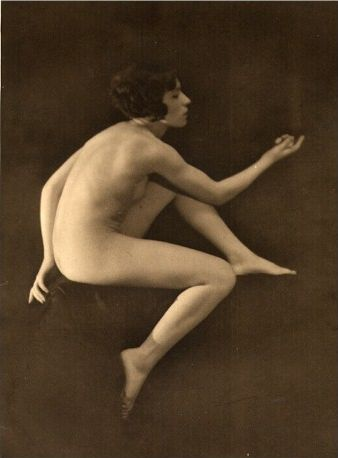
A woman from the Folies Bergère, 1920

== See also ==
- List of Poles

== Bibliography ==
- Aneta Ostroróg, "Znany – nieznany – zapomniany. Nieco informacji o Stanisławie Julianie Ostrorogu", Dagerotyp 2005, nr 14, s. 5–13.
- Walery, Stanislas. (1923) (ur. Stanisław Julian Ignacy, Count Ostroróg – 1863–1929)Nus. Cent photographies Originales de Laryew. Published Paris: Librairie des Arts Décoratifs, A. Calavas.
- Wielowiejski, Zygmunt (29 June 2011). "Słynne akty z lat 20-tych" (in Polish). Wirtualna Polska Kultura.
- Zygmunt Wielowiejski, "Raport w sprawie Ostrorogów – aneks fotograficzny", Dagerotyp 2008, nr 17, pp. 31–47. (in Polish)
