= Stanisław Julian Ostroróg =

Polish colonel and royal photographer

Count Stanisław Julian Ostroróg
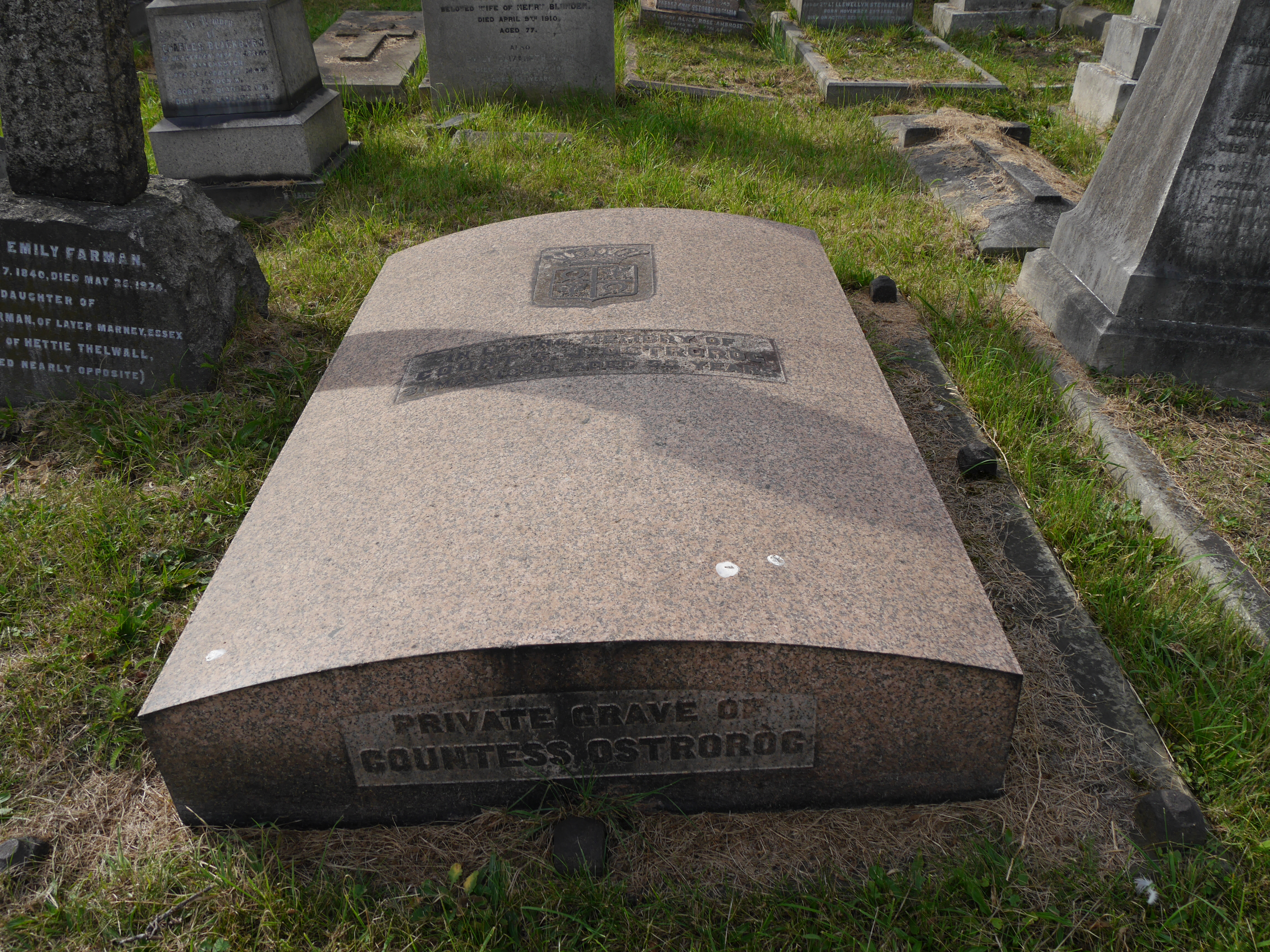
- Ostroróg's grave in Brompton Cemetery
- Born: January 1836; Mohylew, Russian Empire
- Died: 31 May 1890 (aged 54); London, England
- Burial place: Brompton Cemetery, London
- Relatives: Stanisław, his photographer son, Leon, his jurist son and Stanislas his French ambassador grandson
- Military career
- Allegiance: The Russian Empire, the United Kingdom, Poland and the Ottoman Empire
- Branch: British Army
- Service years: 1852–1857
- Rank: Colonel in the Ottoman military
- Nickname: Walery
- Unit: Polish cavalry division of the Ottoman Army
- Commands: Adjutant to gen. Władysław Zamoyski
- Conflicts: Crimean War
- Awards: Gold Medal for photography, Paris 1878, 1889 and others
- Other work: Portrait photographer known as "Walery"

Count Stanisław Julian Ostroróg (January 1836 – 31 May 1890) was an exiled Polish nobleman and Crimean War veteran. He later became known as an early professional portrait photographer who created photogravures, under the professional name of Walery, of many notable contemporaries, including Alexandra of Denmark, Queen Victoria, Victor Hugo, and Sarah Bernhardt.

After his death, his brand, "Walery", was continued by his eldest son, Stanisław Julian Ignacy Ostroróg in London and Paris, sometimes also as "Lucien Walery" and a range of other related pseudonyms.

== Early life ==
Count Stanisław Julian Ostroróg was born in Mohylew, Russian Empire (now Mogilev, Belarus) into the Polish nobility. There is uncertainty about his birth date that ranges between 1830 and 1836. The registration of his death at Brompton Cemetery records him as aged 54 years at time of death whereas his gravestone indicates he was 55 years old when he died on 31 May 1890. His family were involved in the 1830-31 November Uprising against the Russian Empire. The repression against insurgents that followed forced the Ostrorógs eventually to seek asylum abroad, and they may have temporarily joined the Great Emigration to France.

Young Stanisław decided upon a military career and was sent to train at the élite Page Corps academy in Saint Petersburg, Russia. From there he enlisted in the Imperial Guard, where he reached the rank of captain, serving in the Crimean War. During the war, he switched sides and joined the British army under General Storks. Eventually he found his way into the 5th Sultan's Cossacks—a Polish cavalry division—and became adjutant to the exiled General Władysław Zamoyski fighting alongside the British and Ottoman armies. He was made a colonel of the Ottoman army. There is a suggestion in Nadar's mémoire that Ostroróg began taking photographs during his time in the Crimean War, and he is said to have taken a Daguerreotype of Adam Mickiewicz on his deathbed in Istanbul in 1855.

After hostilities ended, Ostroróg settled for a while in London in 1856, and in 1862 he became a British citizen. He appears to have worked on improvements to a musical instrument, that he patented (or bought the patent from J-L Napoléon Fourneaux), called the "melodina", a hybrid piano and organ, which met with little success. His partner in the project, Szumlański, lost all his investment and the patent was sold on to Chappell & Co. That same year, he married the seventeen-year-old Teodozja Waleria Gwozdecka, from a landed Lithuanian family, with whom he had three surviving sons, the eldest of whom, born in 1863, was later to follow in his father's photographic footsteps. After the death in Warsaw of his infant son, Julian Alfred Stanisław (1865-1867), his next surviving son, Leon (1867-1932), who was born in Paris, became a doctor of Islamic jurisprudence and adviser to the Turkish government.

== Photographic career ==
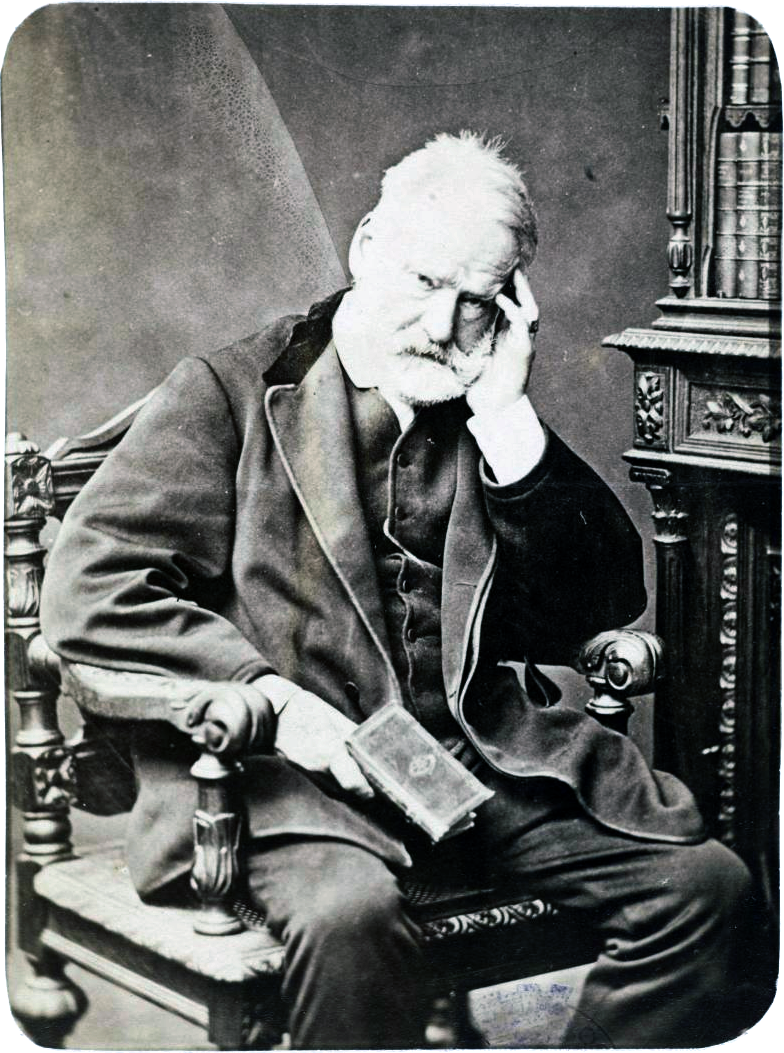
Victor Hugo by Ostroróg. aka Walery, Paris, 1875

As a nine-year-old boy in Paris, Ostroróg is said to have met the distinguished physicist, astronomer and politician, François Arago (1786-1853), of the French Academie des Sciences who not only fired up his interest in optics and the new possibilities of photography, but whose request to the French government had resulted in its purchase of the discoveries of Jacques Daguerre (1787-1851) and Joseph Niepce (1765-1833) for public benefit and donated them to the "Grande Nation", thereby opening the technology to the wider world.

In the illustrated monthly photographic review, "Paris-Photographie", its founder-editor, Nadar, described Ostroróg senior thus:

A clever personality, an energetic, indefatigable business man, perpetually in motion, and most of all, appreciated for his cordiality and kindness. He has several talents, but it is photography that holds the greatest fascination for him.

He settled in Paris around 1857, after his stay in London, and tried his hand at poetry and publishing. When this met with scant success, he was back in London where he met and married his first wife and started a family. In 1864, adopting the sobriquet, "Walery" from his wife's name, "Waleria", Ostroróg set up his first photographic studio in Marseille, on the boulevard du Musée, that lasted till around 1870. He was a member of the Société française de photographie, the French photographic society, between 1867 and 1885. In 1871 after the Franco-Prussian War, he opened a studio in Paris in the rue de Londres. He immortalized such figures as, Gustave Eiffel, Ferdinand Lesseps, Louis Pasteur and Victor Hugo. The collapse of the Société de l'Union Générale, his creditors, put him in financial difficulties and he was forced to rent out his atelier in rue de Londres from 1878. He moved to Nice in 1879 where he started a new business. He is sometimes confused with another Polish exiled photographer, Walery Mroczkowski who called himself, "Ostroga" professionally and also worked at that time on the Cote d'Azur in Menton. He often travelled between Poland (Russian Empire), France and England and contributed to the magazine, Monde Illustré. Not until 1884/5 did he open a studio in London, first in Conduit Street and subsequently in the fashionable Regent Street. During his time in Regent Street, he had his work published by Sampson Low & Co. which helped to spread the fame. His royal, literary and theatrical connections made in Europe, enabled him to gain access to court circles in London.

== Favoured by the Queen ==
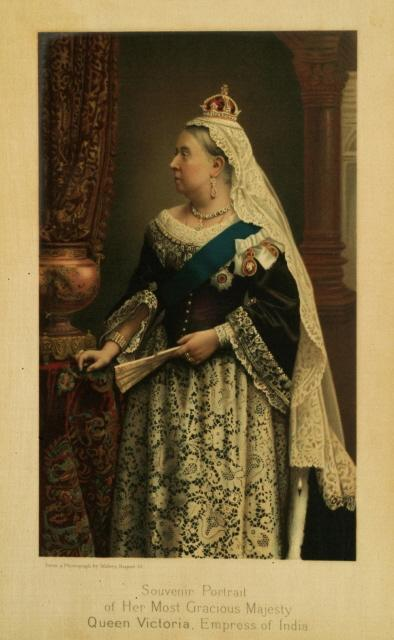
Empress of India, based on a Walery original in the NPG

His first sitting with Queen Victoria was at Windsor in 1884. She took to this charming Polish nobleman for there were further sittings and members of her family and circle were also photographed by him. She especially favoured his innovation - oval brooches where her likeness was printed onto enamel and mounted in brass, which made a useful personalized gift from the monarch. He took numerous portraits of the Queen, especially in her role of Empress of India, which was printed onto silk and widely distributed. This connection enabled him to display the "royal warrant", "Photographer to the Queen" on all his studio work. The warrant can be seen on many original prints of the time, such as that of Arthur Sullivan, the composer.

== Personal life ==
Stanisław Ostroróg was twice married, firstly in 1862 which bore five children. He divorced in 1878 and married Maria Lacroix in December 1889 in London. He died suddenly of an aneurysm in London early on May 31, 1890 and is buried in the central catacomb roundel of Brompton Cemetery. His grandson, Stanislas, by his son Leon became a French diplomat and the country's ambassador to India.

== Awards ==
On the back of some of his extant Cabinet cards, Ostroróg's awards are listed as follows:

- 1873 Vienna "Médaille de Bon Goût"
- 1876 Philadelphia "Médaille de Mérite"
- 1878 Paris Gold Medal
- 1883 Amsterdam Gold Medal
- 1884 Nice "Récompense Unique"
- 1889 Paris Gold Medal

The Royal Commonwealth Society possesses a sizable collection of Walery photographs stored in the Cambridge University Library and records that Ostroróg won a Gold Medal at the Paris Photographic exhibition in 1878.

== Legacy and return to Paris ==
Nałęcz crest of the Ostroróg family

After his death his son, Stanisław Julian Ignacy Ostroróg (1863–1929) continued his father's work in London, collaborating between 1890 and 1908 with Alfred Ellis as Ellis and Walery in Baker Street, before leaving permanently for Paris. There his career prospered, branching out into portraits of stars of the Folies Bergère, especially of Josephine Baker (some of which, by today's standards, may be adjudged as racist or exploitative) and Mata Hari. He also produced studies of the female nude destined for anatomy and art students, often using the Walery anagram of "Laryew".

Given the celebrity of many of the sitters, Walery portraits are held in several major collections in France, the United Kingdom, and the United States. These include the Bibliothèque nationale de France, the Victoria and Albert Museum, the National Portrait Gallery, London, Getty Images, and private collections.

In 2005, the National Portrait Gallery, London, mounted an exhibition entitled "Victorian Women", featuring the work of Walery, father and son.

== Gallery ==
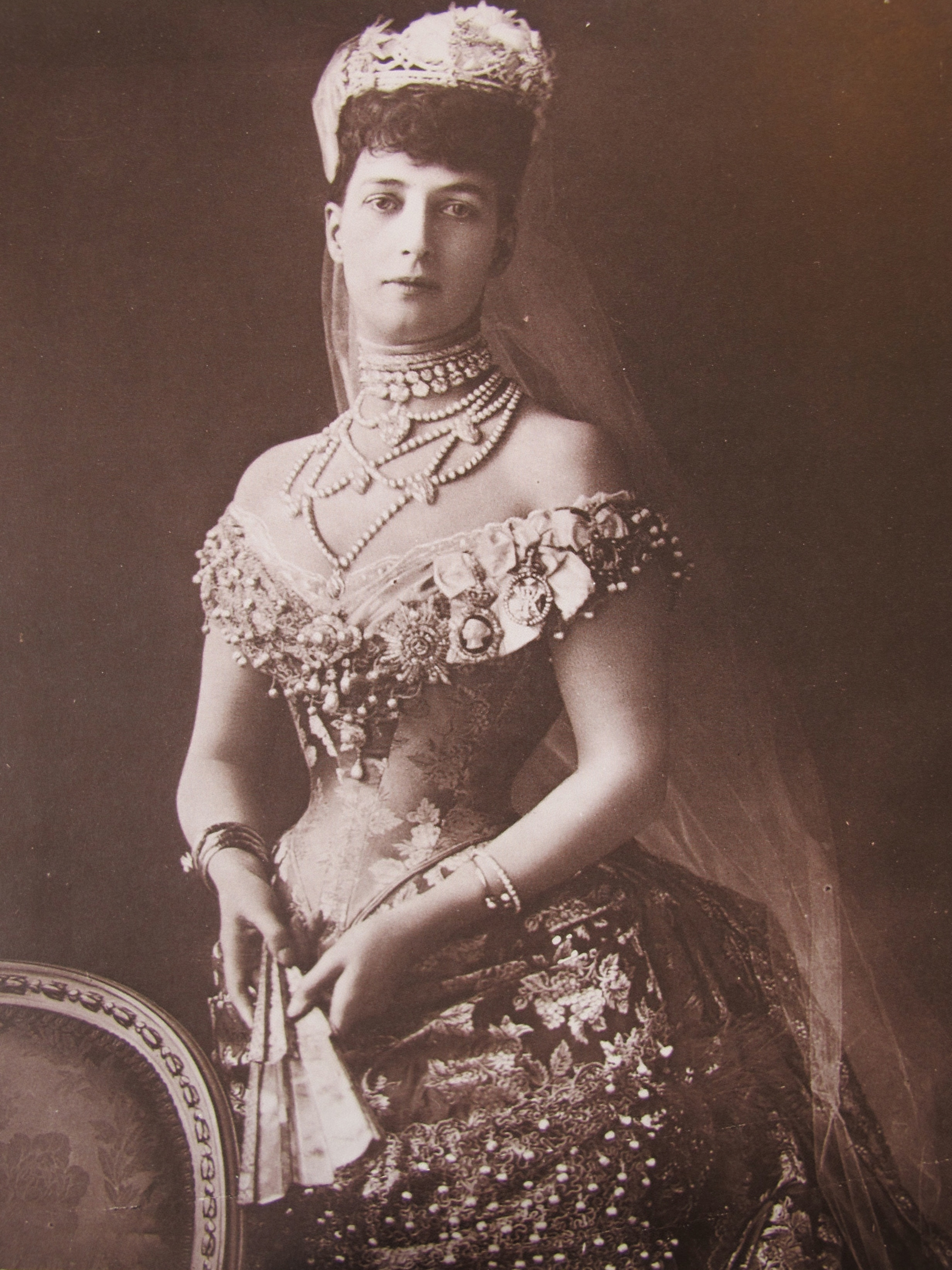
Queen Alexandra in choker

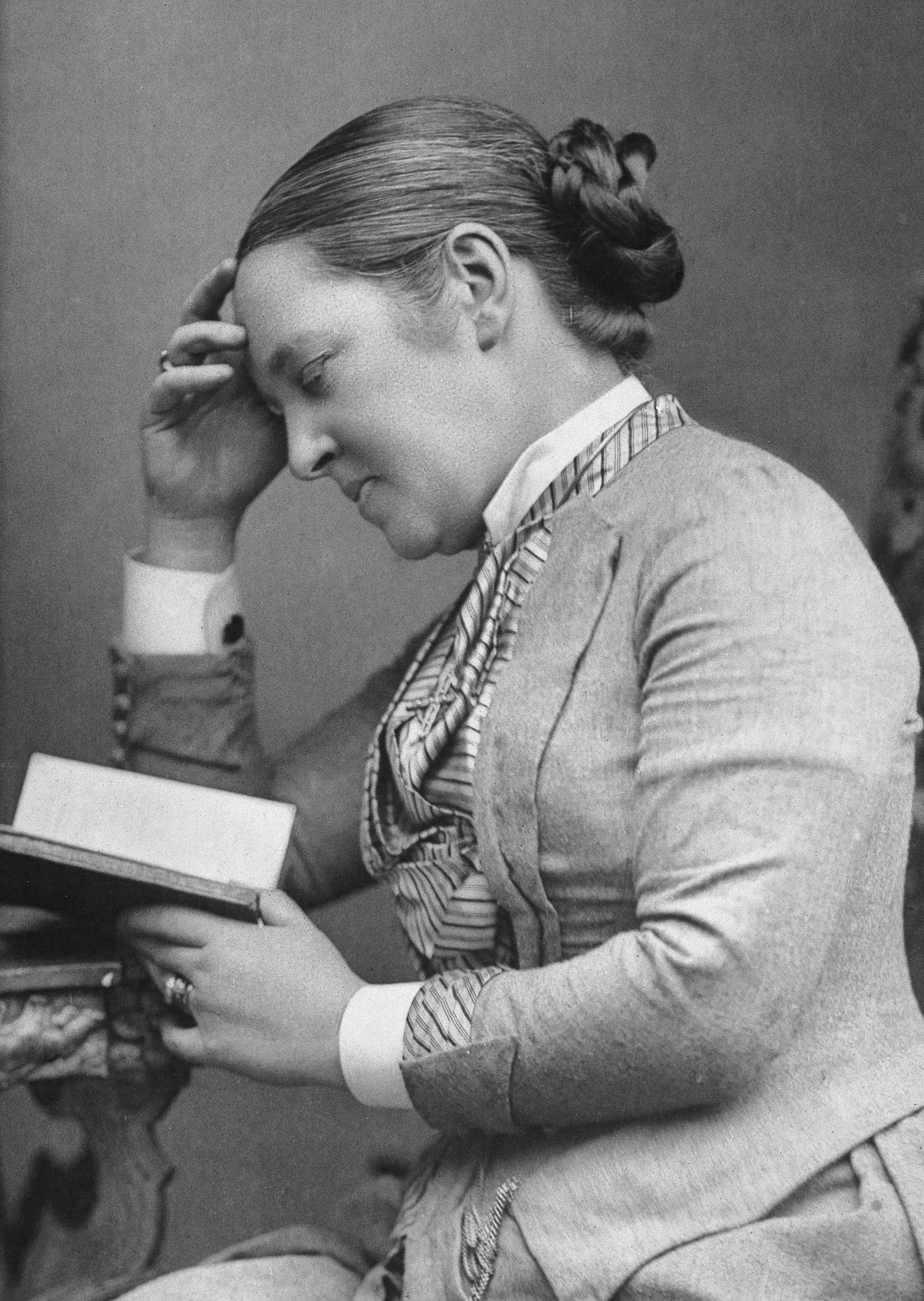
Elizabeth Garrett Anderson

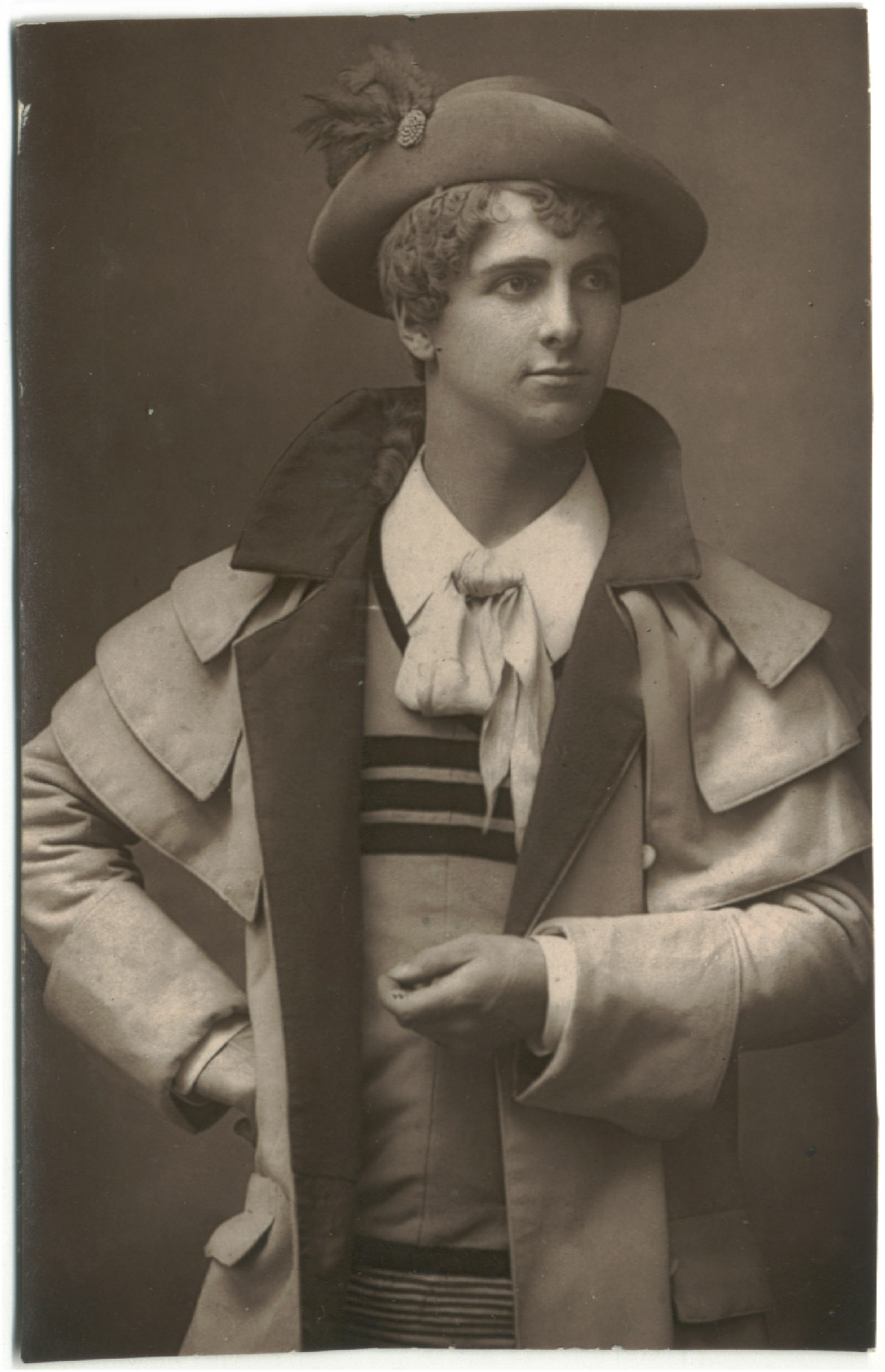
Hayden Coffin 1887

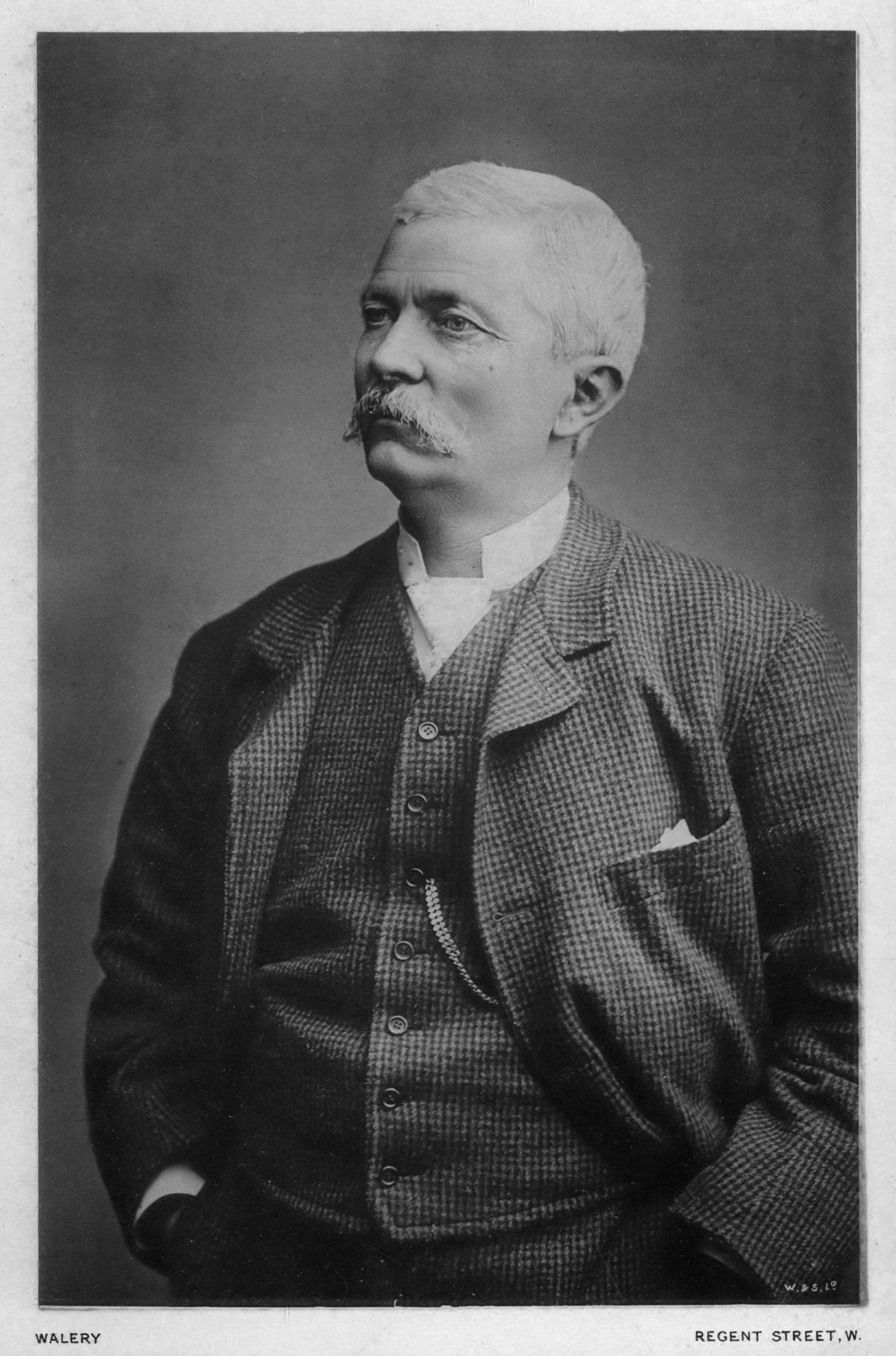
Henry Morton Stanley

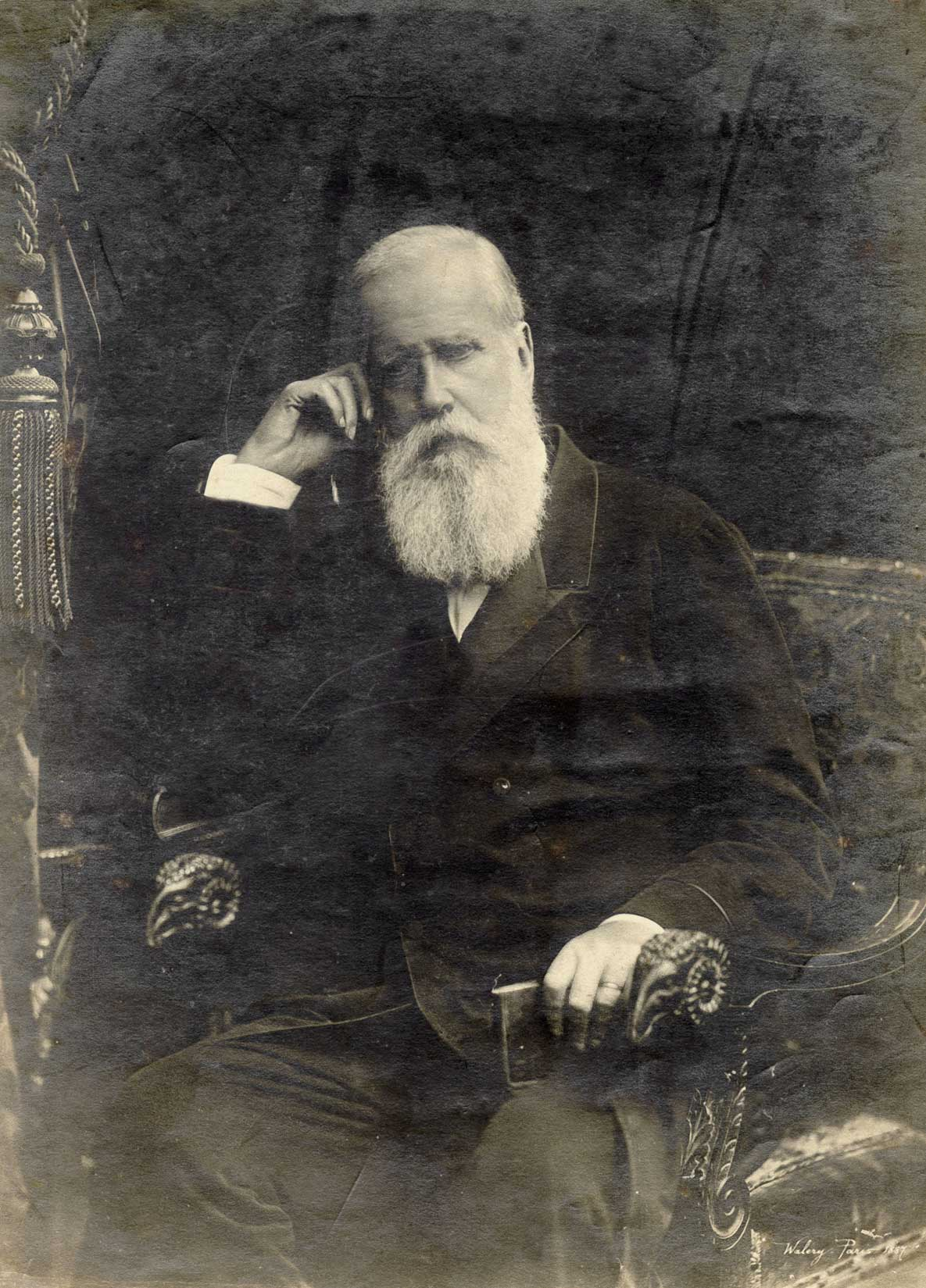
Pedro II of Brazil 1887

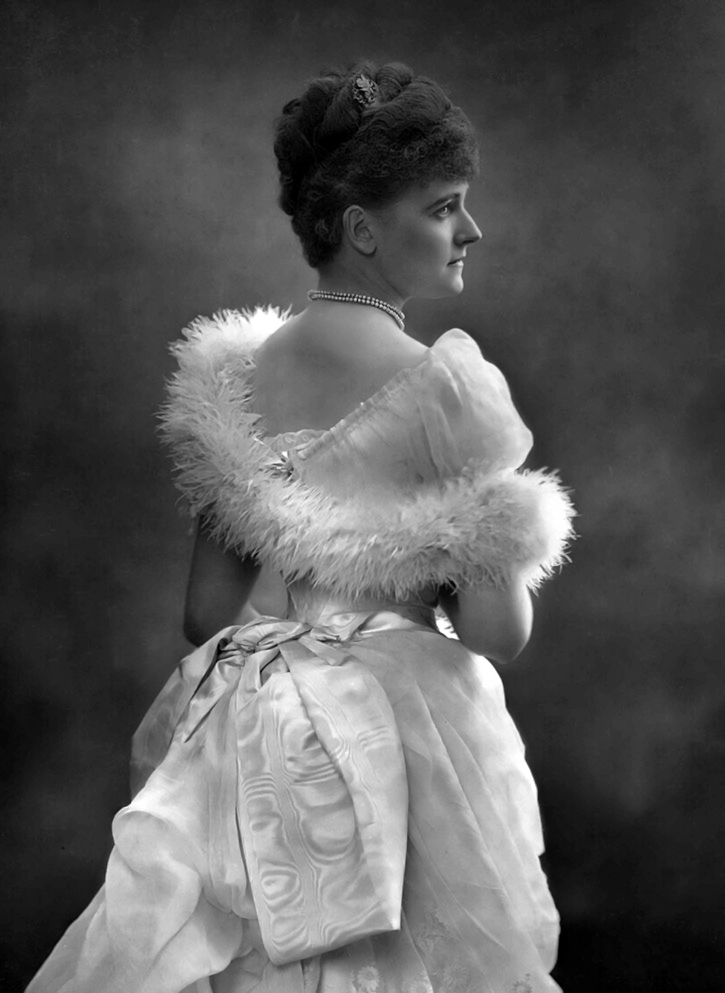
'Daisy', Frances Evelyn Greville, Countess of Warwick 1885

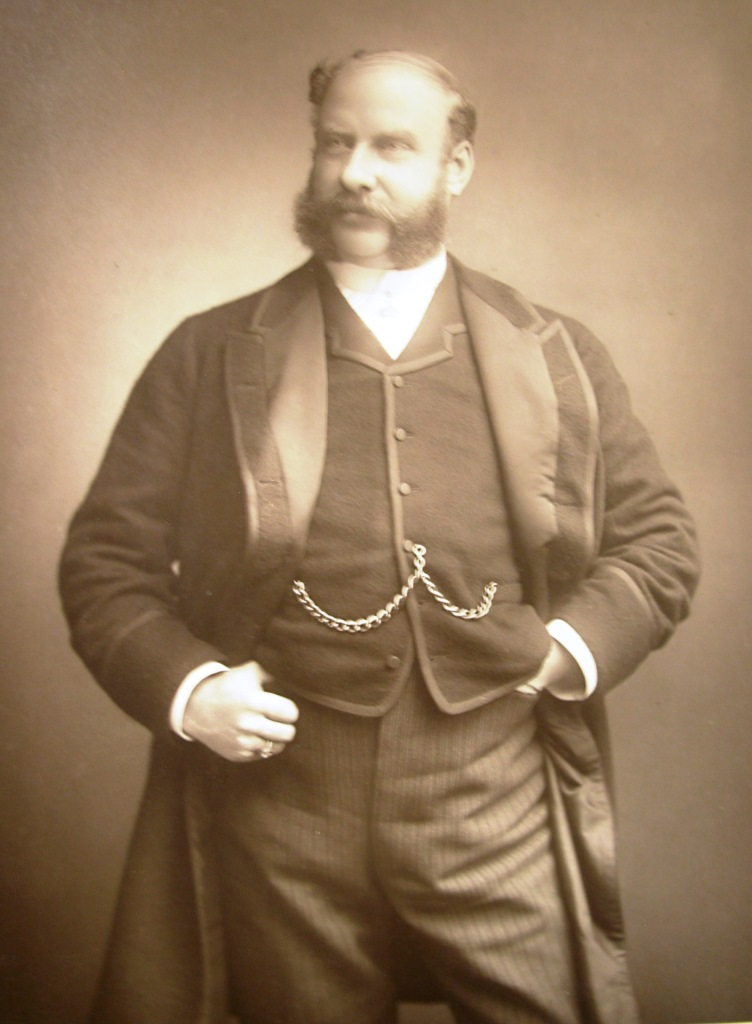
John Thomas North, entrepreneur

== See also ==
- List of Poles
