= Leon Walerian Ostroróg =

Ottoman-Polish statesman

Count Leon Walerian Ostroróg
- Born: Leon Walerian Ostroróg; 20 June 1867; Paris, France
- Died: 29 July 1932 (aged 65); London, United Kingdom
- Resting place: Istanbul, Turkey
- Education: Sorbonne University
- Occupations: scholar, jurist, government adviser, translator and writer
- Years active: 1891–1930
- Era: late 19th- and early 20th-centuries
- Known for: Turkish government adviser and Islamic jurisprudence, member of Polish delegation at the Paris Peace Conference, 1919
- Spouse: Marie-Jeanne Carmel Lorando
- Children: 2
- Parent(s): Count Stanisław Julian Ostroróg and Teodozja Waleria Gwozdecka
- Relatives: Stanisław Julian Ignacy Ostroróg, Stanislas Ostroróg, Gustaw Gwozdecki,

Leon Walerian Ostroróg (20 June 1867 – 29 July 1932), was an Islamic scholar, jurist, adviser to the Ottoman government and émigré in Istanbul. He was also a writer and translator.

== Early life ==
The family coat of arms, Nałęcz

Ostroróg was the third son of Count Stanisław Julian Ostroróg, a British and France-based Polish emigrant of noble descent and his wife, Teodozja Waleria Gwozdecka. The family travelled frequently between the UK, France and Poland. The father was a noted Victorian photographer, who after working in Marseille and Paris, eventually settled in London. Meanwhile, Ostroróg underwent schooling in France and attended the Sorbonne where he completed a doctorate, later specialising in Islamic Law.

== Career ==
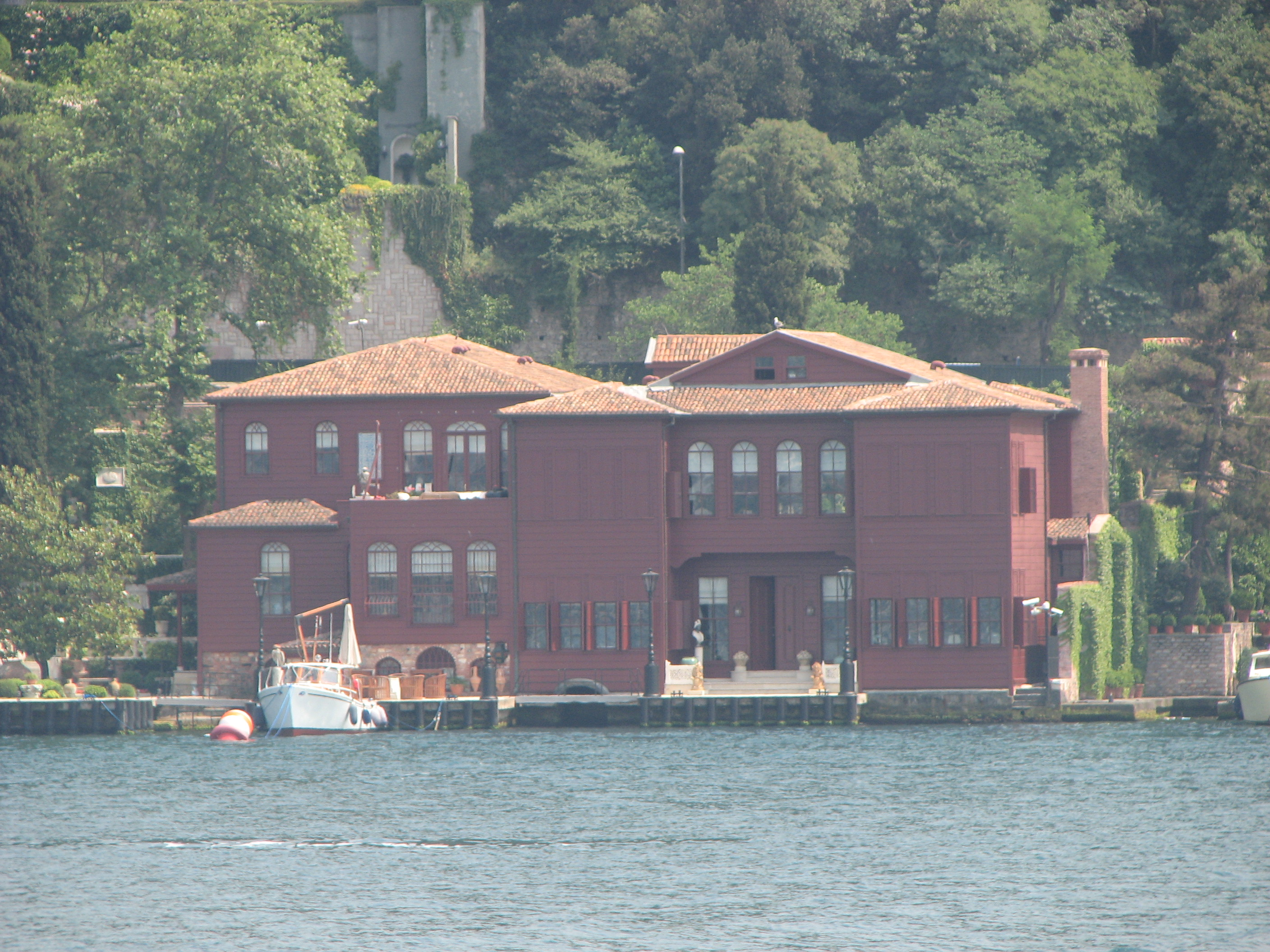
Leon Ostroróg's Yali in Kandilli on the Bosporus waterfront

He was attracted to the Ottoman Empire as it was a popular destination for the exiled Polish diaspora in the 19th century. It was also a place to which his father had travelled in his youth and is reputed to have taken a death-bed photograph of the Polish bard, Adam Mickiewicz. His first job was as an adviser in the Ottoman Public Administration of debt in Istanbul. His erudition and social connections led to a friendship with a number of French intellectuals, including, Pierre Loti. He was later taken on as a government adviser despite his Christian origins. He kept his employment status through the Young Turk Revolution, until 1914. With the outbreak of the I World War, he returned to Europe. By 1918 his star in Istanbul had waned and his contract with the government was terminated. He was enamoured of the country and married Marie-Jeanne Lorando of Christian European descent, but from a long-established Levantine family with whom he had two sons, Jean and Stanislas. The younger of the two, Stanislas became a French diplomat. He also had a traditional wooden mansion, a Yali built in Kandilli on the Bosporus waterfront, which stands to this day.

Count Ostroróg was a member of the Polish delegation to the Paris Peace Conference, 1919. According to The New York Times obituary about him, he was a contributor to the Encyclopædia Britannica.

Later in life, he settled in London where he lectured at University College London in Turkish studies. He died in London and his body was taken for burial back to Turkey. His contribution to Turkish-European relations is said to have been significant and his role in Turkey becoming a modern state is still being evaluated.

== Works ==
His publications include:

- "Droit romain: de la comptabilité des banquiers à Rome. Droit français et législation comparée de la constitution des sociétés anonymes en France, dans l’empire allemand et en Grande-Bretagne". Doctoral Thesis, Paris: L. Larose et Forcel, (1892)
- El-Ahkam Es-Soulhaniya, Paris: Ernest Leroux, (1900–01), 2 vols. Translation of the works of Islamic jurist, el-Mawardi. Review in the Journal of the Royal Asiatic Society of Great Britain and Ireland:
- Conférence sur la Renaissance du Japon, Istanbul: Ahmed Ihsan, (1911)
- Pour la réforme de la justice ottomane. Paris: A. Pedone, (1912)
- Le problème turc. Paris: Maison Ernest Leroux, (1917)
- The British Empire and the Mohammedans, (1918) an essay by Count Leon Ostroróg, National Archives, Kew, ref. FO 141/786/5
- The Turkish Problem: things seen and a few deductions. London: Chatto & Windus, (1919)
- The Angora Reform: Three Lectures Delivered at the Centenary Celebrations of University College on June 27, 28 & 29, 1927. London: University of London Press, (1927)
- "Les droits de l’homme et des minorités dans le droit musulman". Revue de droit international, 5, 1–22. (1930)
- Pierre Loti à Constantinople, (1927)
- The book of Count Lucanor and Patronio : a translation of Don Juan Manuel's El Conde Lucanor, (1925)
- Rinconet et Cortadille : tableaux de l'ancienne Espagne tirés de la nouvelle de Miguel de Cervantes Saavedra
