= Stanisław Grocholski =

Polish painter

- Born: Stanisław Grocholski; 6 June 1858; Żołynia, Austrian Empire
- Died: 26 February 1932 (aged 73); Buffalo, United States of America
- Education: Jan Matejko Academy of Fine Arts in Kraków; Academy of Fine Arts, Munich
- Known for: Painting
- Movement: Realism
- Spouse: Izabela Pawłowska

Stanisław Grocholski (6 June 1865 – 26 February 1932) was a Polish painter, active in Poland, Germany, and in the United States. He is the son of Antoni Rafał of the Syrokomla Coat of Arms.

== Biography ==
He was born in Żołynia. From 1877 to 1880, he took classes with Władysław Łuszczkiewicz at the Jan Matejko Academy of Fine Arts in Kraków. Later, with Carl Wurzinger in Vienna, with Léon Bonnat in Paris, and with Alexander von Wagner at the Academy of Fine Arts in Munich.

In 1886, Grocholski exhibited the interior of a church in Vienna. His first notable work was Drying of the Sore (Suszenie bielizny; 1889), which was exhibited in Munich. He was most active in Munich, where he lived for up to 20 years. Here, he sold his paintings to private collectors and exhibited some of his most notable artwork in museums. He sent his artwork to Warsaw, Kraków and Lwów (then Poland, now Lviv in Ukraine) for exhibitions.

He lived with his wife, Izabela Pawłowska, in a villa in Neu-Pasing on the outskirts of Munich, and turned his house into a colony for Polish artists. In 1891, he founded his own drawing school; where inter alia have studied, including: Gustaw Gwozdecki, Karol Kowalski-Wierusz, Henryk Szczygliński, Soter Małachowski Jaxa, and Józef Gałęzowski. In 1901, he moved to the United States of America in Milwaukee.

He painted portraits, genre art (especially Hutsuls folklore and Jewish folklore), as well as religious art for churches in Poland. Between the years 1880 to 1900, he exhibited his paintings at the Glaspalast in Munich. He had also worked with the magazines Die Gartenlaube and Moderne, where woodcuts based on his artworks were printed. In Poland, reproduction of the artist's work were published in the journals Kłosy and Tygodnik Illustrowany.

He painted the interior scenes of folk cottages, conveying the everyday life of the people, capturing: the celebrations, indulgence, sickness and fighting.

He died in 1932 in Buffalo, New York.

== Selected paintings ==
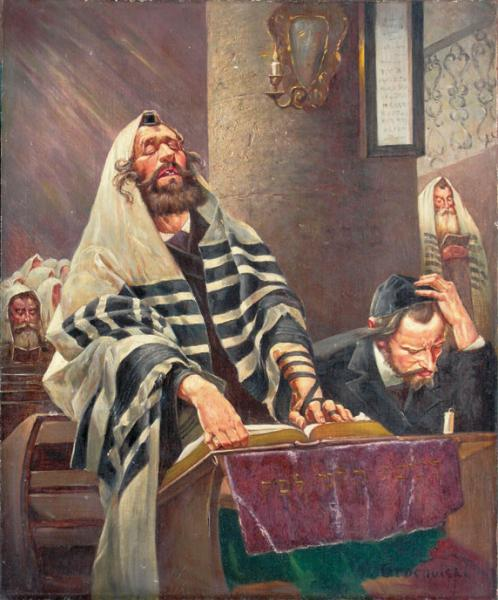
Praying Jews

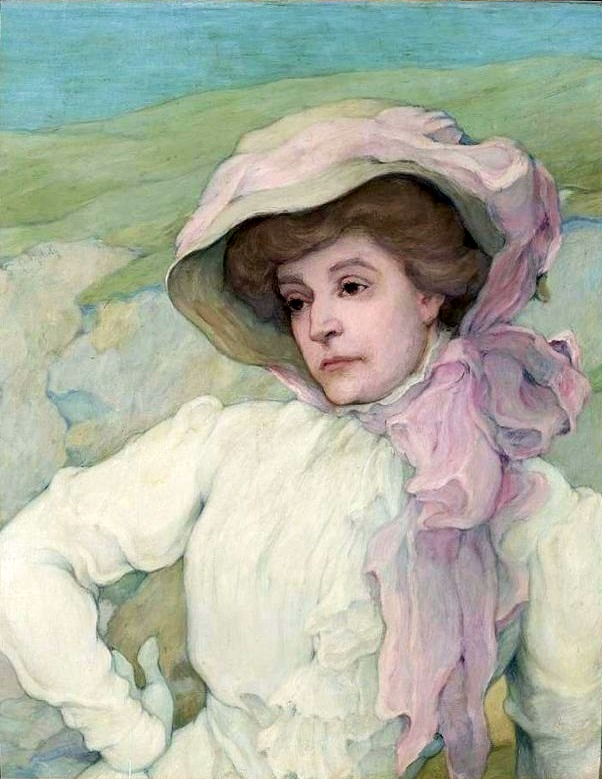
Portrait of a woman

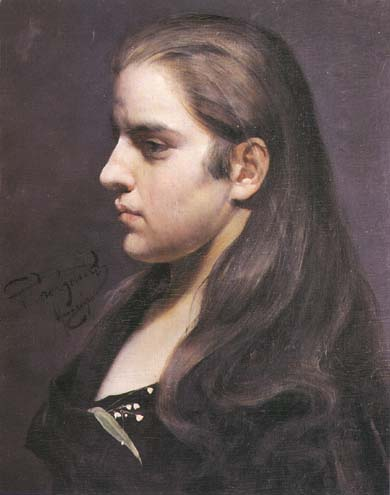
Portrait of a woman with a lily

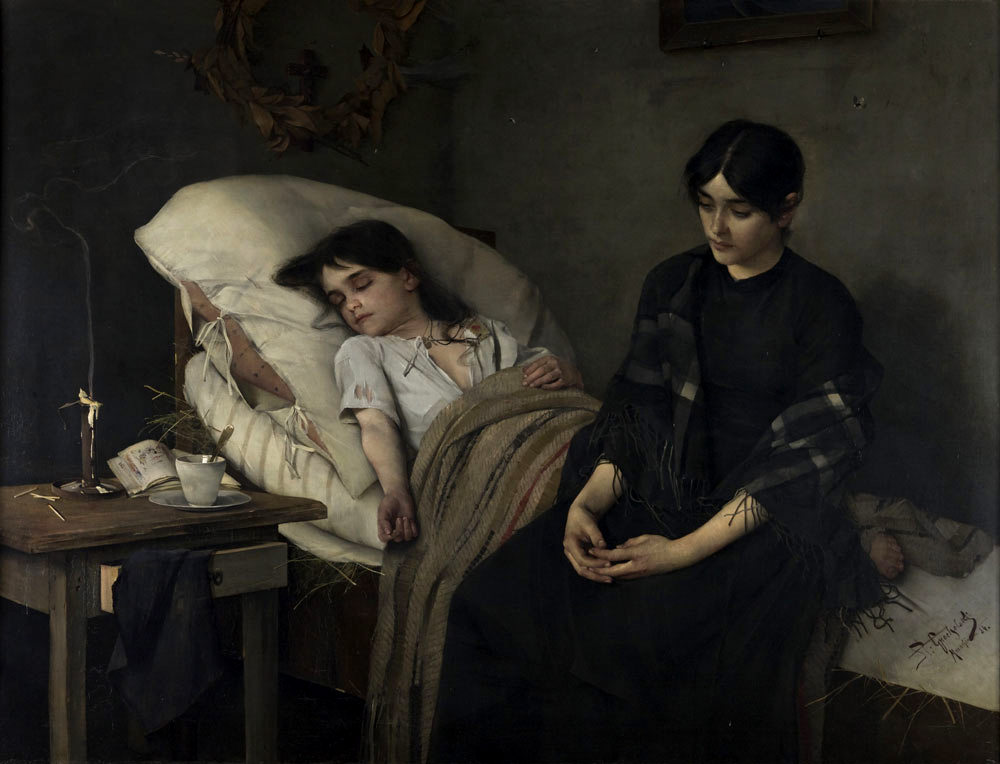
Death of an Orphan

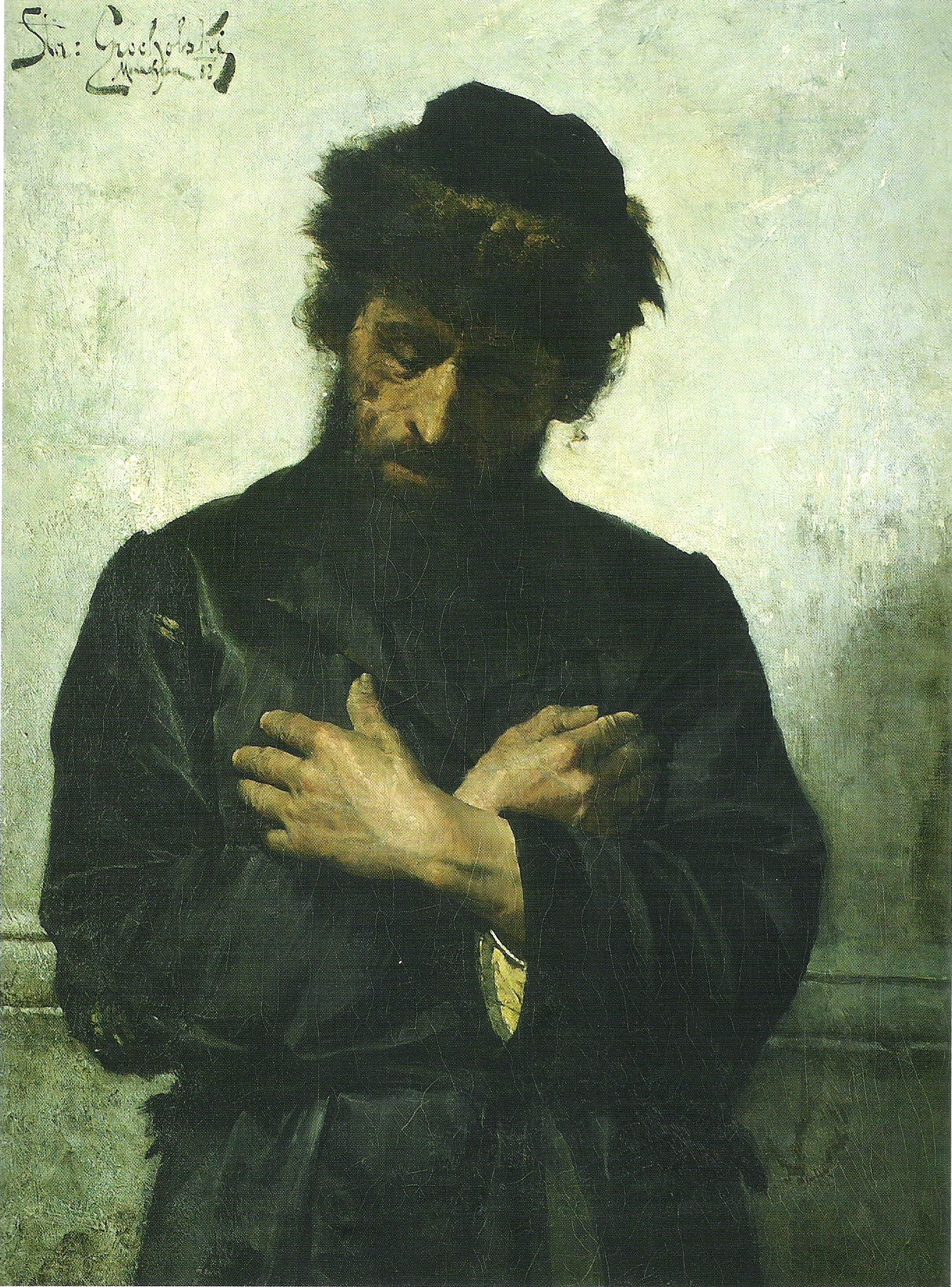
Praying Jew

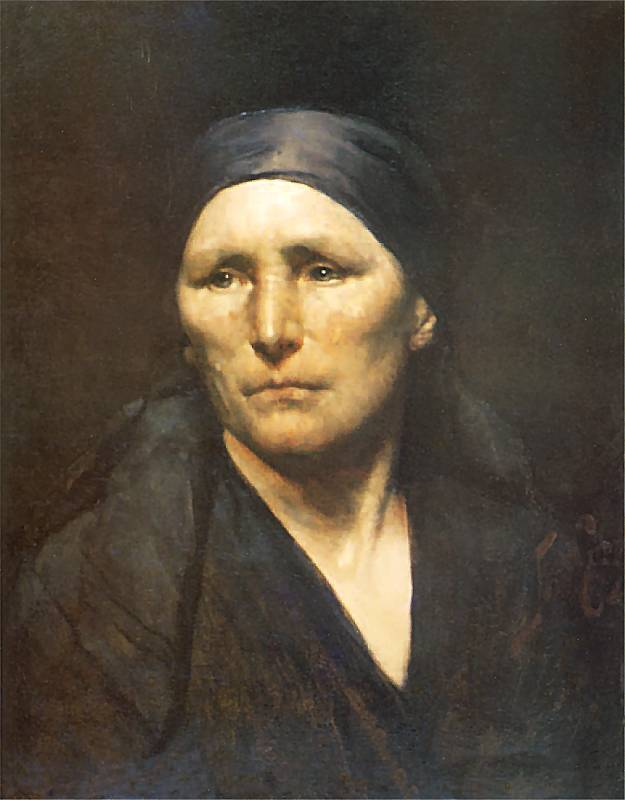
Woman from Bavaria
