= Stanislas Ostroróg =

French diplomat

Ambassador to Dublin, French Ambassador to India

Personal details
- Born: 20 May 1897 Ottoman Empire
- Died: 27 September 1960 (aged 63) Paris
- Relations: Stanisław Julian Ostroróg, grandfather, Stanisław Julian Ignacy Ostroróg, uncle
- Education: École libre des sciences politiques
- Profession: Diplomat

Nałęcz crest of the Ostroróg family

Count Stanislas Marie Joseph Antoine Ostroróg (20 May 1897 – 27 September 1960) was a French diplomat from a noble Polish family, serving in several Asian countries over the course of his career. His father Count Leon Walerian Ostroróg (1867–1932), a Polish émigré in the Ottoman Empire, was an advisor to the Ottoman Ministry of Justice during the Second Constitutional Period (1908–1918). His mother Jeanne-Marie Lorando (1870–1932), was the daughter of a notable Levantine family of Italian and French descent.

== Early life ==
Ostroróg was the grandson of the noted Victorian photographer, Count Stanisław Julian Ostroróg, through his third son, Count Leon, a jurist and Koranic law scholar. He was born in the Ottoman Empire in 1897. He studied in France and returned to Kandilli on the Bosphorus after finishing school. He would meet the author Claude Farrère in Turkey. Ostroróg wanted to be an author and would later use his writing skills in his diplomatic career. As the First World War broke out, he returned to France to look for his father and brother. He would find his father in London instead. Travelling between Kandilli and France, he was pushed by his father to return to school. He graduated from the École libre des sciences politiques (Free School of Political Science) and was admitted to the French foreign service by a stiff entrance exam in 1927. Meanwhile, his uncle, Stanisław under the pseudonym, Walery, had a brilliant photographic career in Paris, photographing the gaiety of the city, including Josephine Baker.

== Diplomatic career ==
Ostroróg was admitted as a permanent member of the Cercle de l'Union interalliée in July 1936.

Ostroróg had served as Assistant High Commissioner in China and Syria in the 1930s; he then served as First Secretary in Moscow until 1940 and then served Vichy France in the Far Eastern Department before rallying to the Free French. “…he was often confused with his brother who was rumoured to be a Vichy agent.”

Ostroróg was a Minister Plenipotentiary, assigned as General Delegate and Plenipotentiary from France to the Levant in 1945. He is also listed by the US State Department as “French Diplomatic and Political Adviser in the Levant” in 1945.

After his credentials were withdrawn by the Vichy Government, he was appointed Minister Plenipotentiary to Dublin on 21 November 1946, becoming the French Ambassador to Dublin on 11 August 1950. He was involved in returning the remains of Irish poet William Butler Yeats from France to Ireland in 1948; in a letter to the European director of the Foreign Ministry in Paris "Ostrorog tells how Yeats’s son Michael sought official help in locating the poet’s remains. Neither Michael Yeats nor Seán MacBride, the Irish foreign minister who organised the ceremony, wanted to know the details of how the remains were collected, Ostrorog notes. He repeatedly urges caution and discretion and says the Irish ambassador in Paris should not be informed." Yeats' body was exhumed in 1946 and the remains were moved to on ossuary and mixed with other remains. The French Foreign Ministry authorized Ostrorog to secretly cover the cost of repatriation from his slush fund. Authorities were worried about the fact that the much-loved poet's remains were thrown into a communal grave, causing embarrassment for both Ireland and France.

=== Service in India ===
Ostroróg spent a decade in government service in India, where he oversaw the return of the French Establishments to India.

He was appointed Ambassador of France to India on 26 June 1951, a position he held until his death in 1960.

In a diplomatic correspondence from early 1954, Ostroróg pressed his government "to put an end to the long reprieve of French India, without delay if one wants to proceed with honor"; by this point in time, it became clear that the fate of the French establishments were at the whim of the government of India, which desired a united India within a short period of time. The Treaty of Cession that returned the Establishments to Indian sovereignty would be signed by Ostroróg and Jawaharlal Nehru on 28 May 1956.

As the French Ambassador to India, he helped establish the French Institute of Pondicherry in 1958, and laid the cornerstone for what would become the Jawaharlal Institute of Postgraduate Medical Education and Research in 1959.

== Later life ==
In 1960, he was recalled to Paris by minister Maurice Couve de Murville; working in the offices of the Quai d'Orsay, he was felled by a cerebral haemorrhage. Unlike the rest of his family members that are buried in Turkey, he would be buried in France.

A modern history book was published in French under his name in 1991; Courrier d'Orient : dépêches diplomatiques / Stanislas Ostroróg (Courrier d'Orient: diplomatic dispatches) with additional info by Yves Plattard.

== Honours ==
- Chevalier de la Legion d'Honneur on 10 January 1936.
- Officer de la Legion d’Honneur on 14 August 1946
- Honorary D.Litt. from the National University of Ireland (1951)
- Commandeur de la Legion d'honneur on 29 July 1955.
