= Alfred Ellis (photographer) =

English photographer (1854-1930)

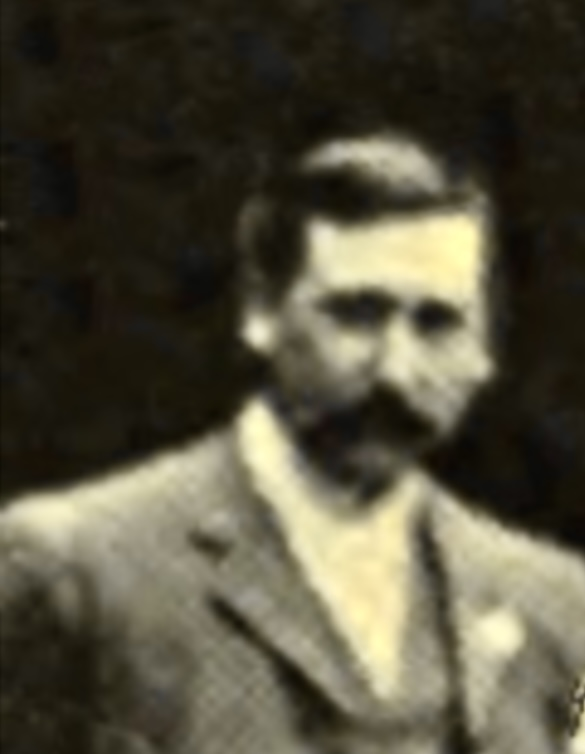
- 1890
- Born: 5 May 1854; St Pancras, Middlesex
- Died: 30 April 1930 (aged 75)
- Resting place: East Finchley Cemetery
- Spouse: Mary Catherine Corbett
- Children: 2
- Father: Edward George Ellis

Alfred Ellis (5 May 1854 – 13 April 1930) was an English photographer who mainly photographed "theatrical royalty" such as Oscar Wilde and Dan Leno. Over 180 of his photographic portraits are held by the National Portrait Gallery in London.

== Early life and career ==
Ellis was born in St Pancras, Middlesex in 1854, the son of Edward George Ellis, a builder. He had a studio on Baker Street in London from 1884 until 1898. From 1898 to 1918 he was in partnership with Stanisław Julian Ignacy Ostroróg as Alfred Ellis & Walery in new premises on Baker Street. Ellis has 180 portraits listed in the national collection in the National Portrait Gallery in London, mainly of "theatrical royalty". Ellis and Ostroróg appear to have kept their authorship and sitters separate, while sharing studio facilities. Prints of his photographs were published in The Illustrated London News as wood-engravings.

From 1883 Ellis was a member of the Photographic Society of Great Britain (which later became the Royal Photographic Society). He was one of the founders of the Professional Photographers' Association and at various times acted as Secretary (1901-1903), President (1903 and 1919), and General Secretary (1919 until his death). He specialised in theatrical photography, at first recreating scenes from theatrical productions in his studio and later photographing them in situ in the theatres. Among these is his historically important image of the original production of Lady Windermere's Fan (1892) by Oscar Wilde at St James's Theatre in London. Showing a scene from Act III, it depicts the actors George Alexander, H. H. Vincent, James Nutcombe Gould, Adolphus Vane-Tempest and Benjamin Webster.

== Legal cases ==
Ellis took a leading role in protecting the copyright of photographers, fighting several cases in the High Courts.

One case, that of Ellis v. Ogden (1894), involved Ellis's photographic portrait of the actress Mary Moore. Having posed at the invitation of Ellis, he had not charged Moore for the sitting or for the copies of the photographs he gave her. However, when one of these was subsequently published in The Ludgate Monthly Ellis sued, stating that he owned the copyright to the photograph as he had given it to Moore as a gift. The Court ruled in his favour as the "author" of the work, and, because Moore had not paid for the photograph, Ellis retained ownership of it.

Ellis was not so fortunate with another case, that of Ellis v. Marshall (1895). Again, Ellis had invited actors to be photographed free of charge in his studio. The actors, Harry Nicholls and Charles Kenningham, posed for two portraits – the first in theatrical costume and the second in their own personal everyday attire. As with Moore, there had been no charge for either the sitting or the copies of the photographs he gave to the two actors. However, the actors did pay the photographer for the portraits taken in plain clothes, one of which was published in The Ludgate Monthly along with an article on Harry Nicholls. In Court Ellis again argued that as the sitting and the photographs had been free he retained possession of the copyright on both sets of pictures. However, Justice Collins found against him, arguing that the plain clothes' portraits had been taken at the request of the actors, and as they had paid Ellis for them, he did not retain ownership of them. As a result of this case, Ellis was one of the founders of the Photographic Copyright Union, in which he later served as vice president.

== Personal life ==
In 1887 Ellis married Mary Catherine Corbett, and together they had a son Douglas Ellis (1891-) and a daughter, Effie Mary Ellis (1889–1982)

Ellis died in 1930 and was buried in East Finchley Cemetery.

Portraits by Ellis
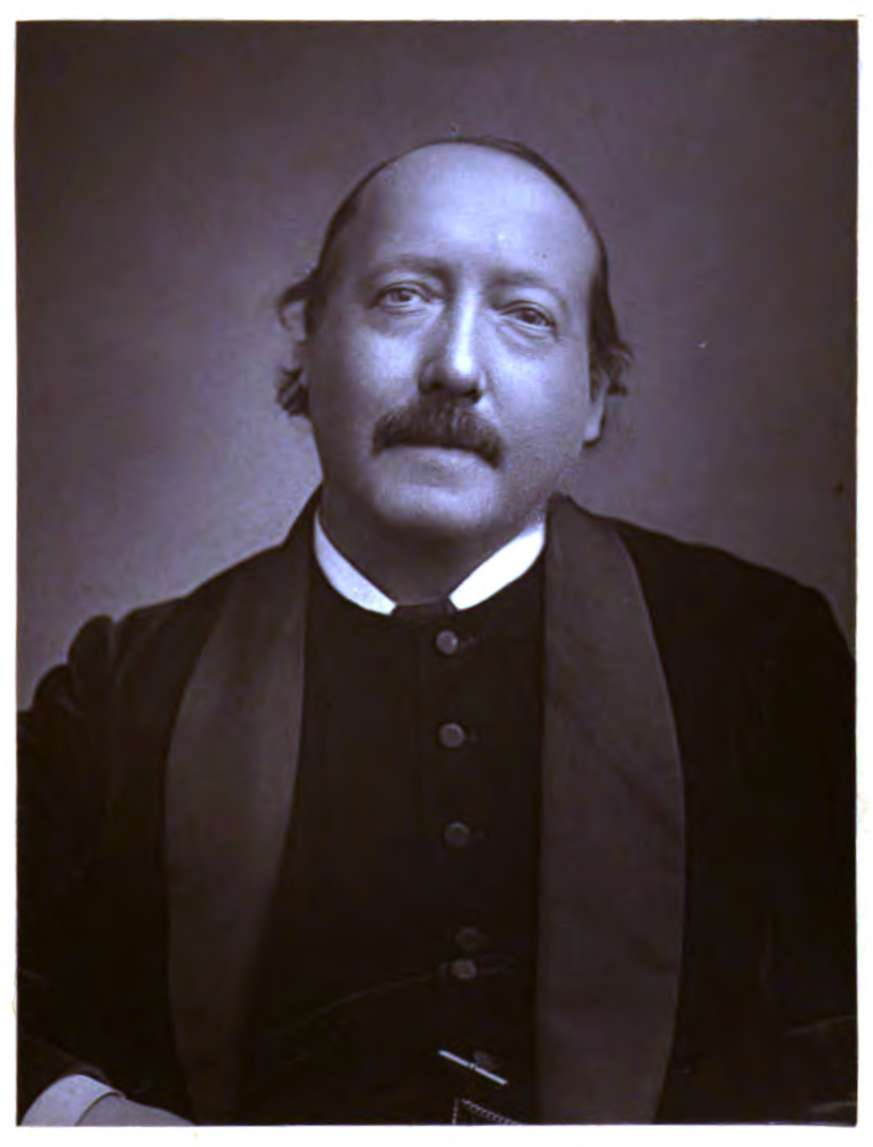
Portrait of William Davenport Adams

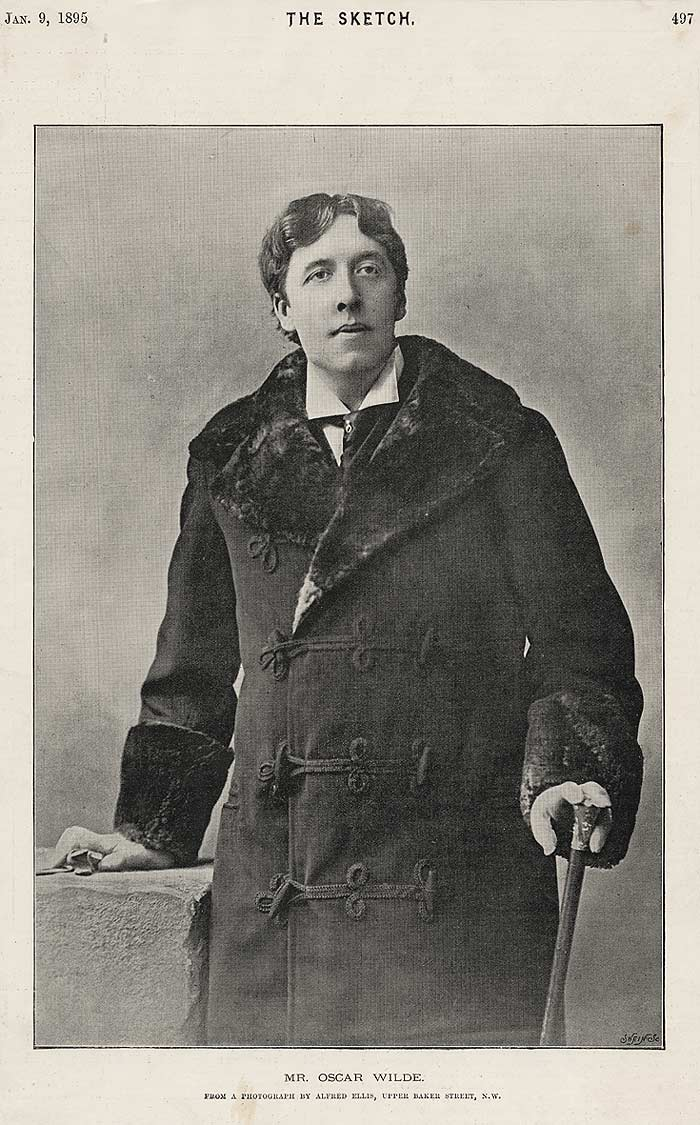
Portrait of Oscar Wilde taken in 1892, and reproduced in The Sketch, 1895

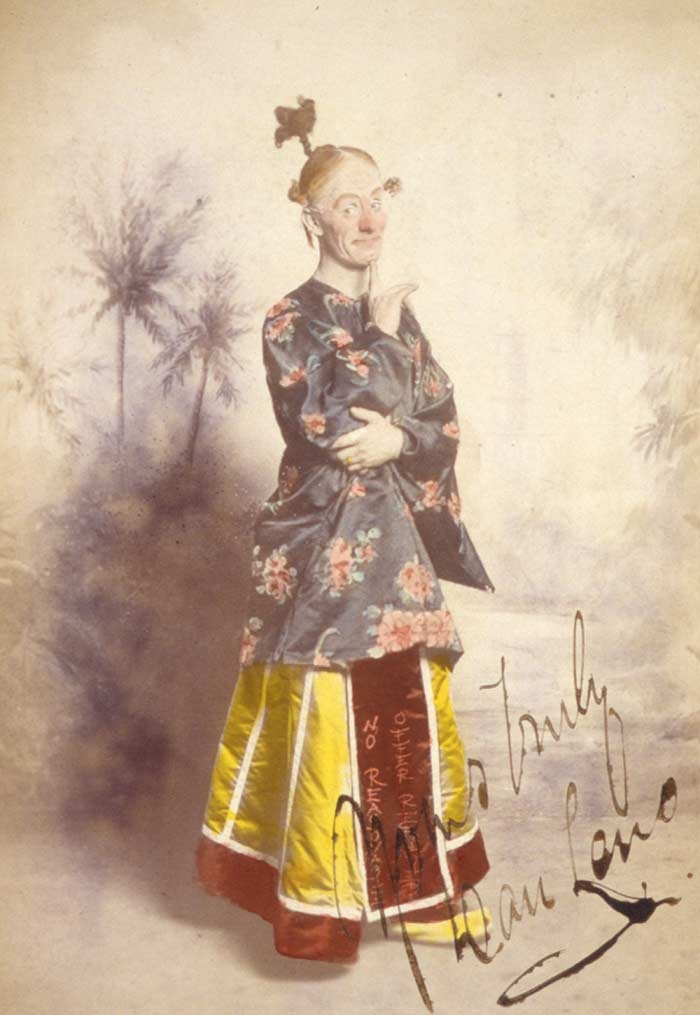
Hand-coloured black and white photograph of Dan Leno as Widow Twankey, 1896

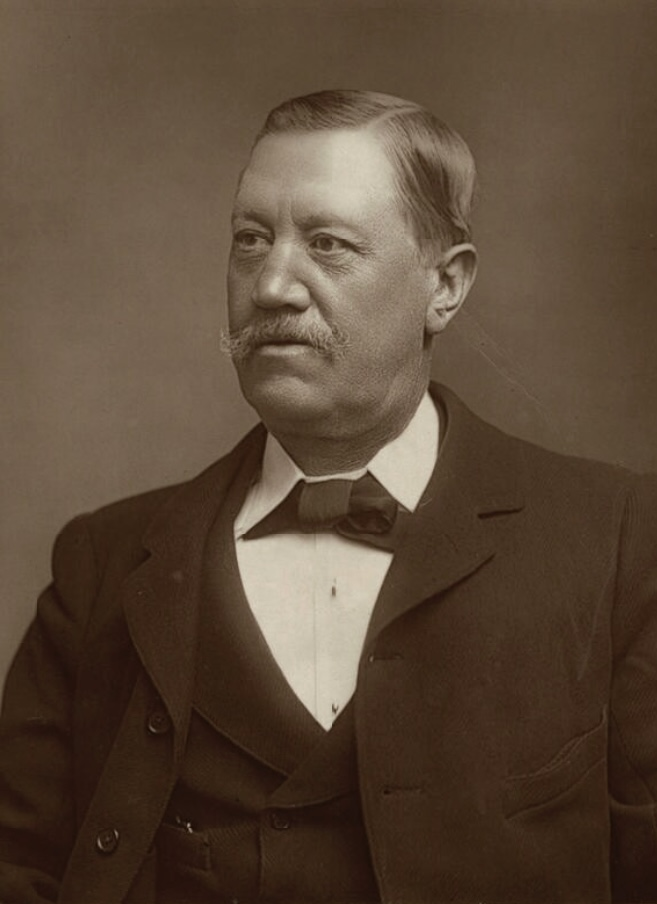
A Woodburytype portrait of George Conquest. Published in The Theatre, 1895
