= Walery Cyryl Amrogowicz =

Polish numismatist, activist and philanthropist (1863–1931)

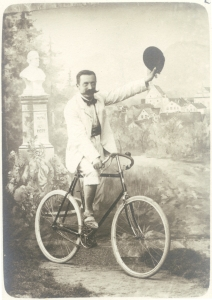
Walery Cyryl Amrogowicz (1863–1931) circa 1910–1920

Walery Cyryl Amrogowicz (1863–1931) was a Polish numismatist, nationalist, philanthropist and collector of cultural artifacts.

== Biography ==
He came from a rural Pomeranian family, and was born in Nowogród on 8 April 1863. During his studies at a Secondary School in Toruń he developed a liking for history and geography which was to contribute to his passion for numismatics. Following his studies, he became a court clerk. He worked in Toruń, Puck, and Kościerzyna. Amrogowicz was known for his patriotism. Throughout his whole life he worked with various Polish social organisations and provided material aid to many students from poor families (among them Dr Aleksander Majkowski, a future expert on Kaszuby). He was a major benefactor of the Scientific Help Society for the Youth of the Grand Duchy of Poznań. In Sopot Amrogowicz established the People's Bank, designed to assist small business, and became the president of the Bank for several years.

During the First World War he purchased a house in Sopot (next to the present day Museum of Sopot) in which he lived following his retirement in 1919. From this time Amrogowicz dedicated his life to developing his collection of money and Kaszubian art. He established a numismatic society in Gdańsk (Danzig), the Guldenrunde, where he gave lectures. In 1911 he published a treaty on old Slavic coins. His collection, primarily consisting of coins and medals, contained approximately 2000 items. His art collection also consisted of several paintings (including, among others, prints by Rembrandt, Dürer and Chodowiecki), paintings ordered from Marian Mokwa, pictures documenting Kaszubian art and architecture, and various other items such as cuneiform tablets. Among his pastimes during this period were walks along the beach towards Jelitkowo, short bicycle rides and swimming in the sea - regardless of the weather.

In 1928 Walery Cyryl Amrogowicz completed the creation of five and two zloty coins (and possibly of the ten zloty coin) according to his own design. Polish Ministry of Treasury rejected his design, but he nonetheless ordered some sets for himself and friends. The (casts) for these were created by the German Karl Goetz, the coins being minted in Munich (some sources claim Nuremberg). The coins were minted in gold, bronze and silver. Examples minted in gold and platinum which have appeared at auctions and been catalogued, by (Parchimowicza) for example, are suspected to have been later productions.

Walery Amrogowicz died in 1931 in Krynica where he had gone to convalesce. In his will, he left the majority of his collection to the Toruń Society of Science, and books, to a gymnasium in Gdańsk. Following World War II it was transferred to the Toruń Regional Museum which held an exhibition in 2004 to mark the 140th anniversary of Amrogowicz's birth.
