= Gustaw Gwozdecki =

Polish painter and sculptor (1880–1935)

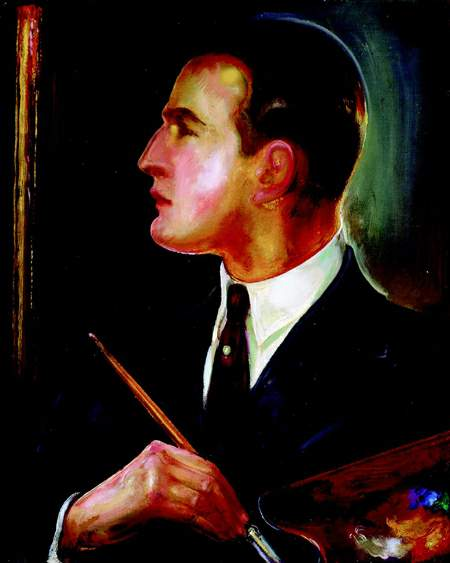
- Self Portrait (1928)
- Born: Gustaw Gwozdecki; 23 May 1880; Warsaw, Poland
- Died: 8 March 1935; Paris, France
- Education: Jan Matejko Academy of Fine Arts in Kraków
- Known for: Painting
- Movement: Modernism, Expressionism, Fauvism

Gustaw Gwozdecki (May 5, 1880 – March 3, 1935) was a Polish painter, sculptor, printmaker, and a representative of Post-Impressionist Kapists.

== Biography ==
He was born in Warsaw. He was the son of Florentyn, a journalist and vice-director of the Warsaw Theatre Directorate. In 1899, he began his artistic studies in Munich where he was accompanied privately by Stanisław Grocholski and Anton Ažbe. There he debuted at the Kunstverein, where he exhibited his artwork. In 1900, he went to Kraków where he studied at the Jan Matejko Academy of Fine Arts, where he was taught by Jan Stanisławski, and since 1901, in Warsaw where he was taught by Konrad Krzyżanowski. In 1902, he received his scholarship at the Society of the Incentive for Fine Arts (Towarzystwo Zachęty Sztuk Pięknych) and he went to the Parisian National School of Fine Arts, where he was taught sculpture by Hubert Ponscarm. From that point forward, he spent most of his years in Paris, and in 1904, he exhibited his artwork at the Salon d'Automne – from which Gustaw Gwozdecki became part of the Salon des indépendants. He regularly took part in exhibitions in Warsaw, Poznań, and Vienna.

In 1914, he co-lead the Polish Academy of Fine Arts (Polska Akademia Malarstwa) in Paris. From 1916, he had travelled extensively, and from 1917 to 1927 he permanently stayed in New York City, where he was the leader of Annual Salons. During his time in the United States he grew interest in the Polish communities. He advocated Polish fine arts in the United States and in France, and was a member of the Society of Polish Artists "Sztuka" (Stowarzyszenie Artystów Polskich "Sztuka") and the Society of Polish Artists "Rytm" (Stowarzyszenie Artystów Polskich "Rytm") where he had exhibited his artwork. He died vehemently in his workplace at the age of fifty four years.

He painted landscapes, portraits, caryatids and still life. He made sculptures out of marble and gypsum. His artwork contains simple figures, with repleted rich tones. Many of his artwork is based around the life of native people. His primary artwork made him one of Poland's first modernists and expressionists. After 1910, he moved to Fauvism, by which his artwork gained positive views from French fine arts critics. His artwork was promoted by his friend, Guillaume Apollinaire, which were part of the journal "La Plume". Currently, Gustaw Gwozdecki's artwork is located in various locations, which include: National Museum in Warsaw, Poznań, and Kraków, other international places include: the Society of Polish History and Literature (Towarzystwo Historyczno-Literackie) in Paris; the Gallery of Fine Arts nearby the Yale University; and the New York City based Kosciuszko Foundation in the United States. The rest of the artworks are located in private ownership in France and the United States.

== Selected paintings ==
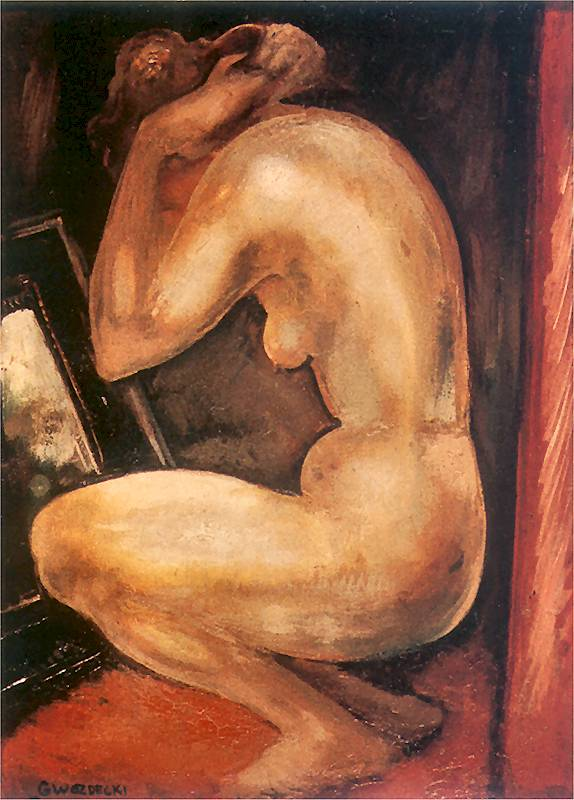
Woman by a mirror

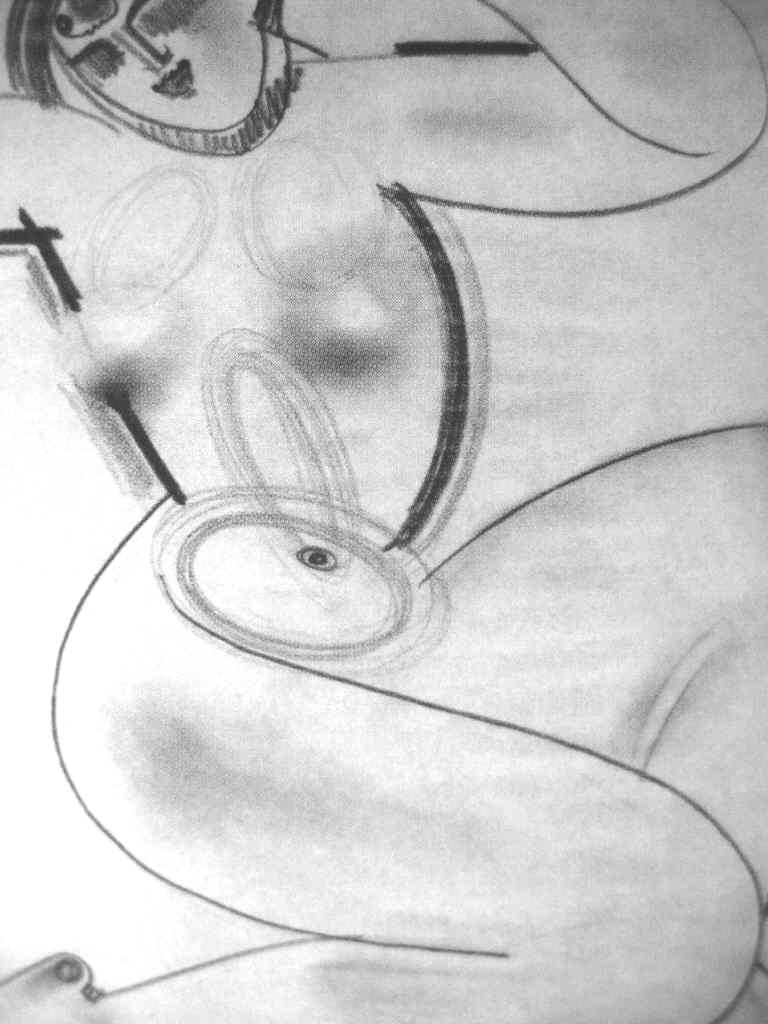
Nude
(1920)

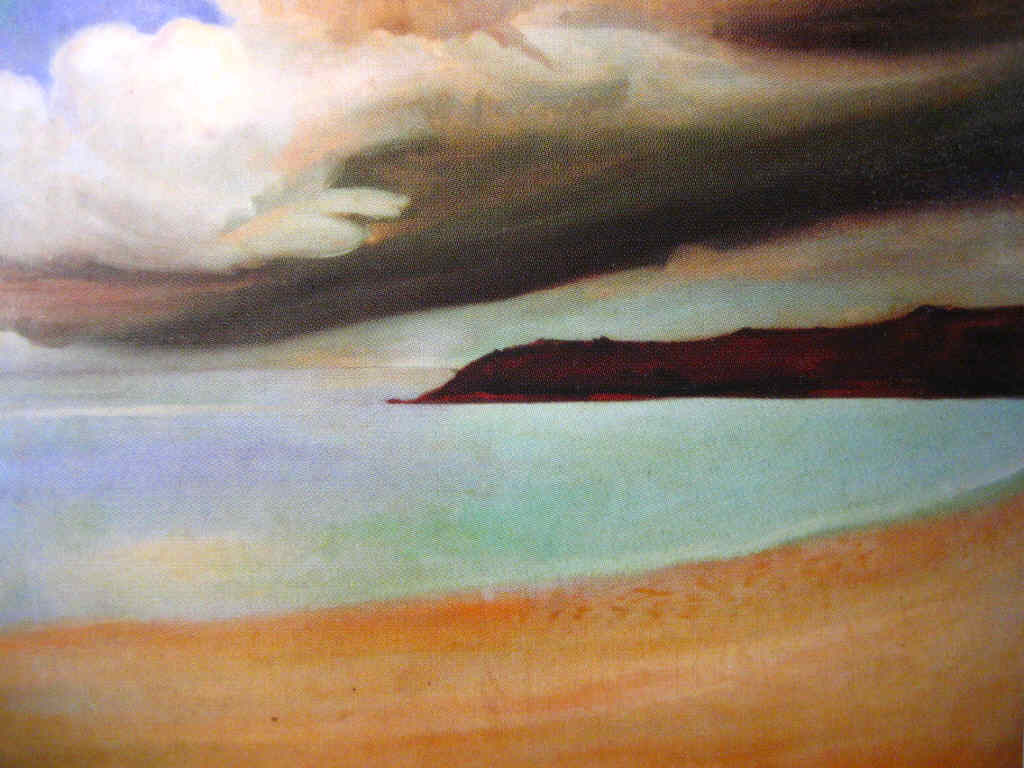
Coastline in Brittany
(1905)

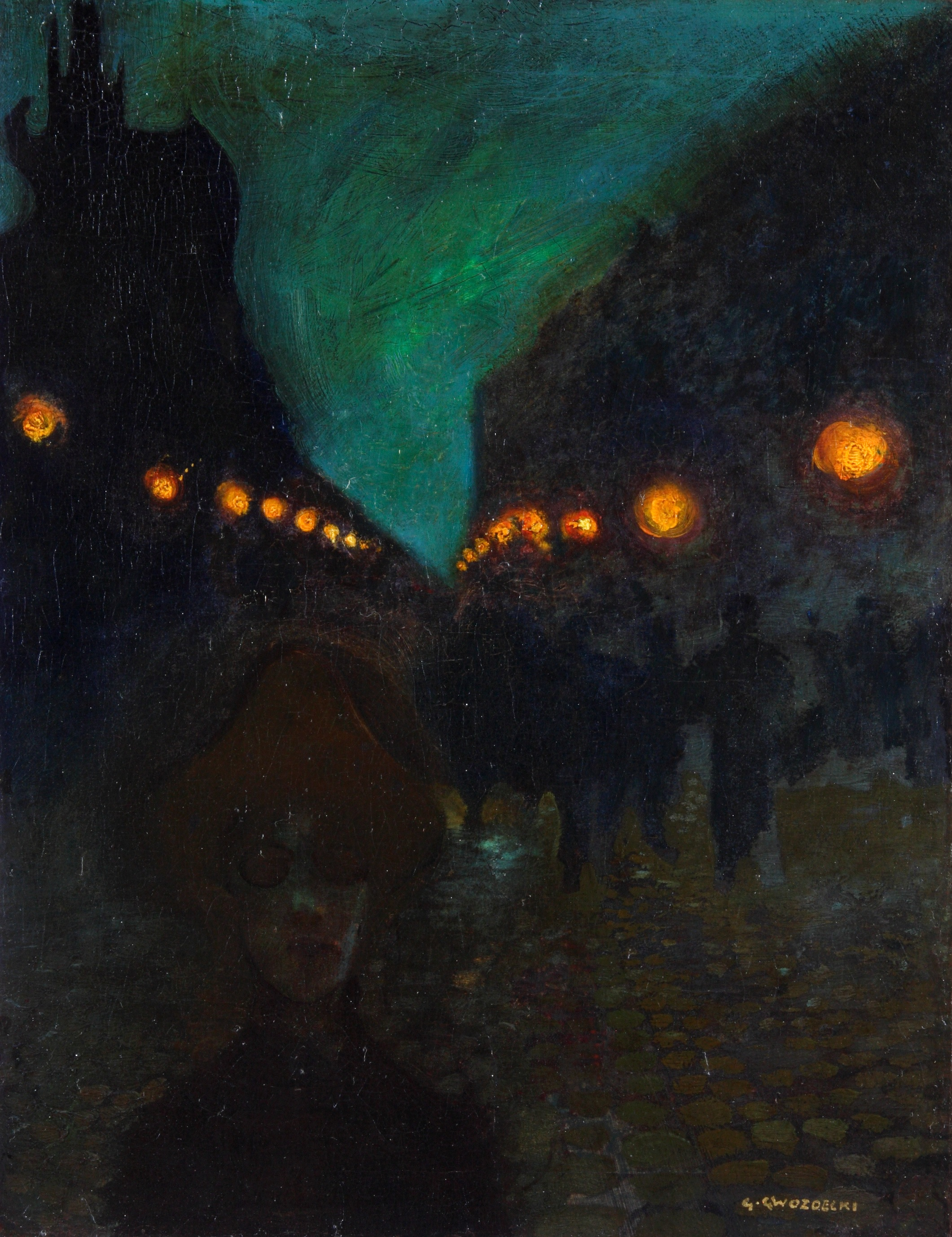
Evening Longing. Paris (about 1904)

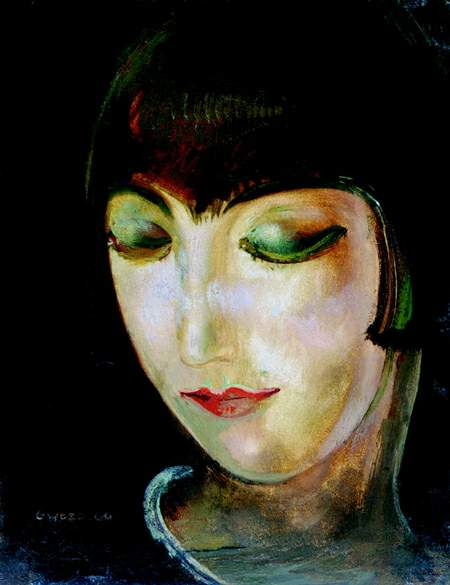
Kiki de Montparnasse
(1920)

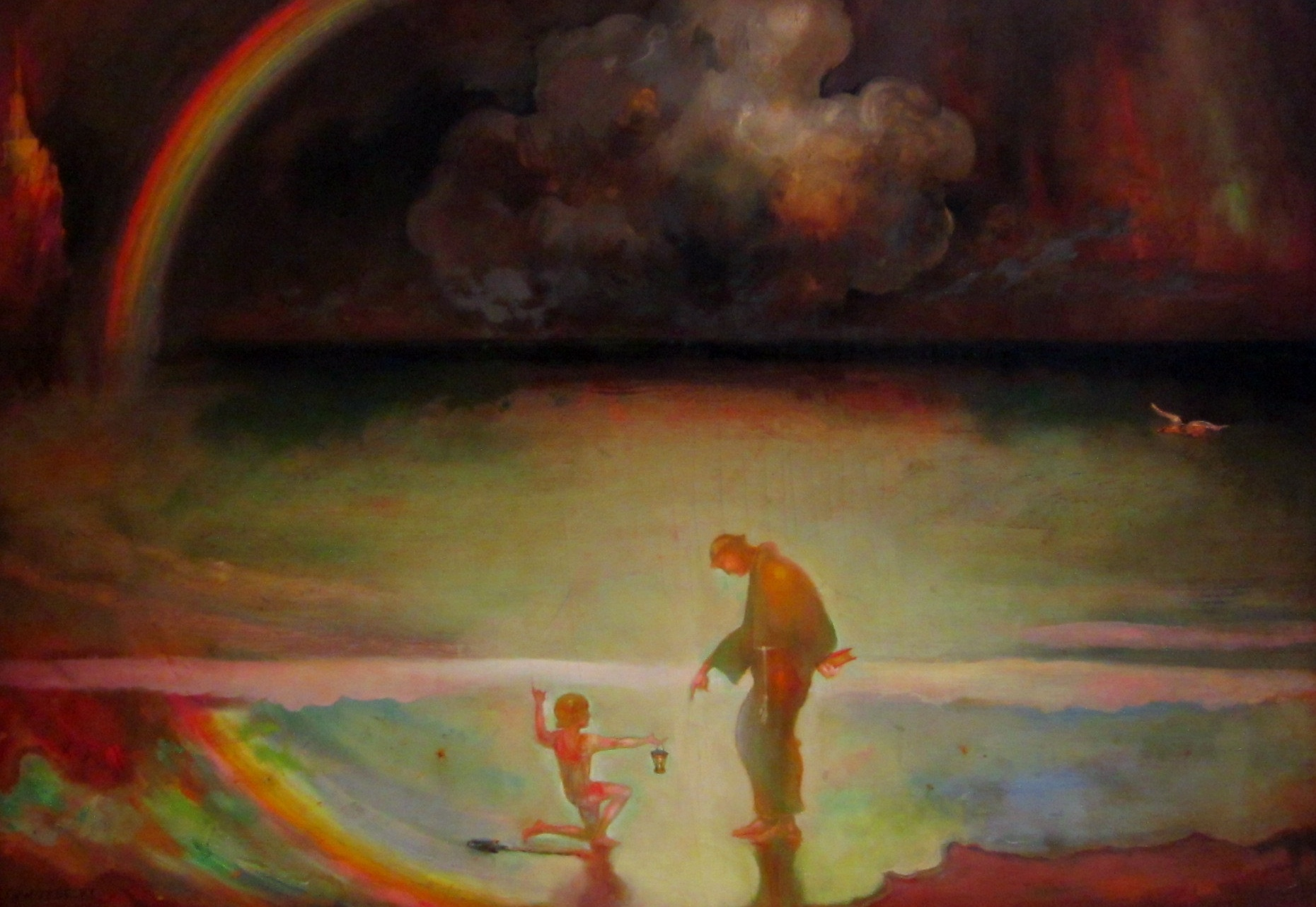
St. Augustine's Dream

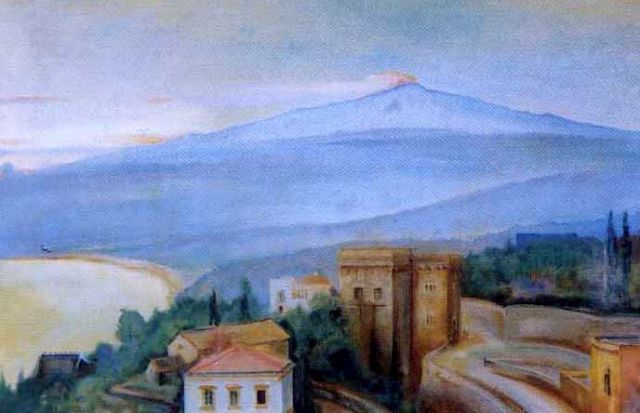
Mount Etna
