= Walery Mroczkowski =

Polish anarchist (1840–1889)

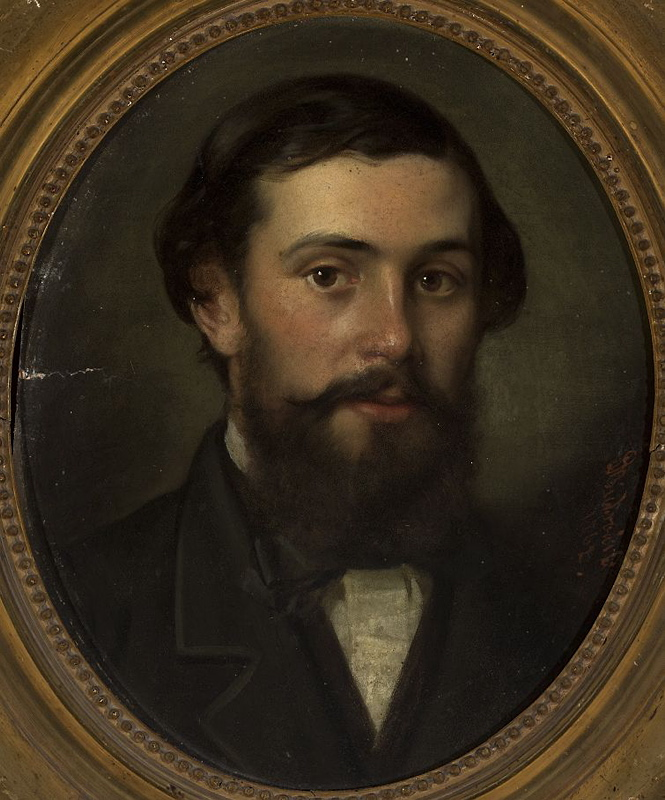
- Walery Mroczkowski 1862 by Biedroński
- Born: 6 April 1840; Olonets, Republic of Karelia
- Died: 1 October 1889 (aged 49); Paris, France
- Resting place: Menton
- Other names: "Wincenty Kamiński", "Valerien Ostroga", "Ostroga"
- Education: Warsaw Academy of Medicine
- Occupation: Photographer
- Years active: 1871–1889
- Era: 19th century
- Known for: January Uprising, photography
- Movement: Anarchism
- Children: Felix (1867–1936) and Léonie (1871–1947) Ostroga
- Parent: unknown
- Relatives: Élisée Reclus

Walery Karłowicz Mroczkowski (6 April 1840 – 1 October 1889) was a Polish insurgent in the 1863 January Uprising. He was arrested and imprisoned by the Prussian authorities. Upon release in 1865, he was sent into exile and travelled to Italy, Switzerland, London and finally settled in France. While in Florence he met Mikhail Bakunin and became an anarchist and a member of the latter's close circle. He is also known as a portrait photographer in France, working under the pseudonym, "Ostroga" or "Valerien Ostroga".

== Early life ==
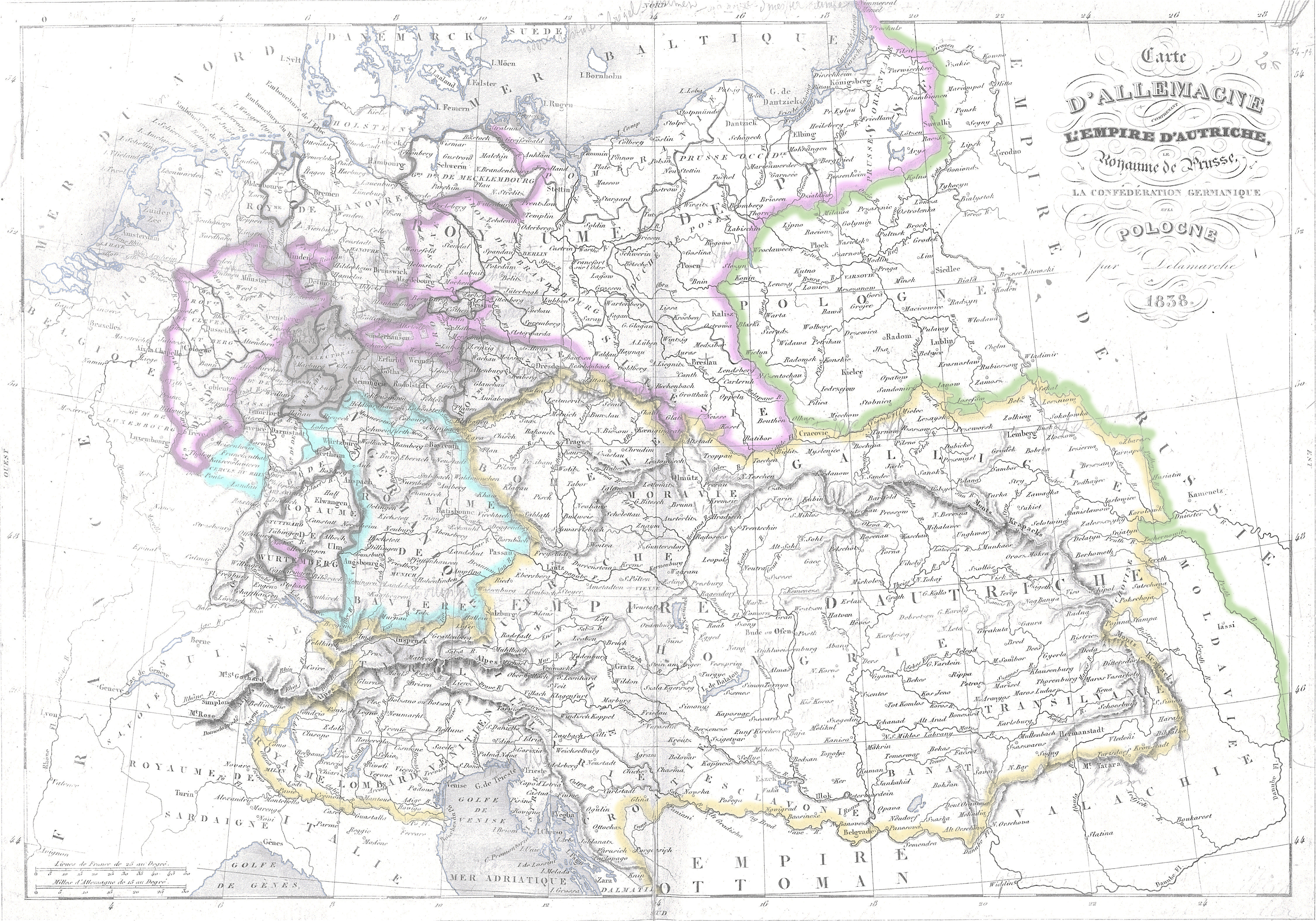
1838 map of Poland divided between Prussia, Russia and Austria-Hungary

Nothing is known, at present, of Mroczkowski's family background or childhood. As the earliest written record, the diary of his uprising colleague Szymon Kotylla published in 1907, indicates that he was a student at the Medical Academy in Warsaw (1860–1861), he would have had access to funds for his interrupted studies and for travel to Italy for military training.' As a convinced patriot he went to Cuneo in Italy to attend the Polish military cadet school (1861–62), commanded by Ludwik Mierosławski in preparation for a future uprising.
On his return to Poland in 1862 the National Central Committee despatched him to the Augustów Governorate, under cover of being a journalist with the nom-de-guerre "Wincenty Kamiński", to help organize military units. He was a Biebrza district commissar, local Plenipotentiary for the Rada Narodowa (National revolutionary council) and was responsible for the purchase of armaments. The following year he took part in a series of skirmishes and in May 1863 he distinguished himself at the head of a relief party in the battle of Kazlų Rūda.
By November 1863 he was in Eastern Prussia where he was arrested and imprisoned in Posen-West Prussia. In 1865 he was released and forced into exile.

== Encounter with Anarchism ==
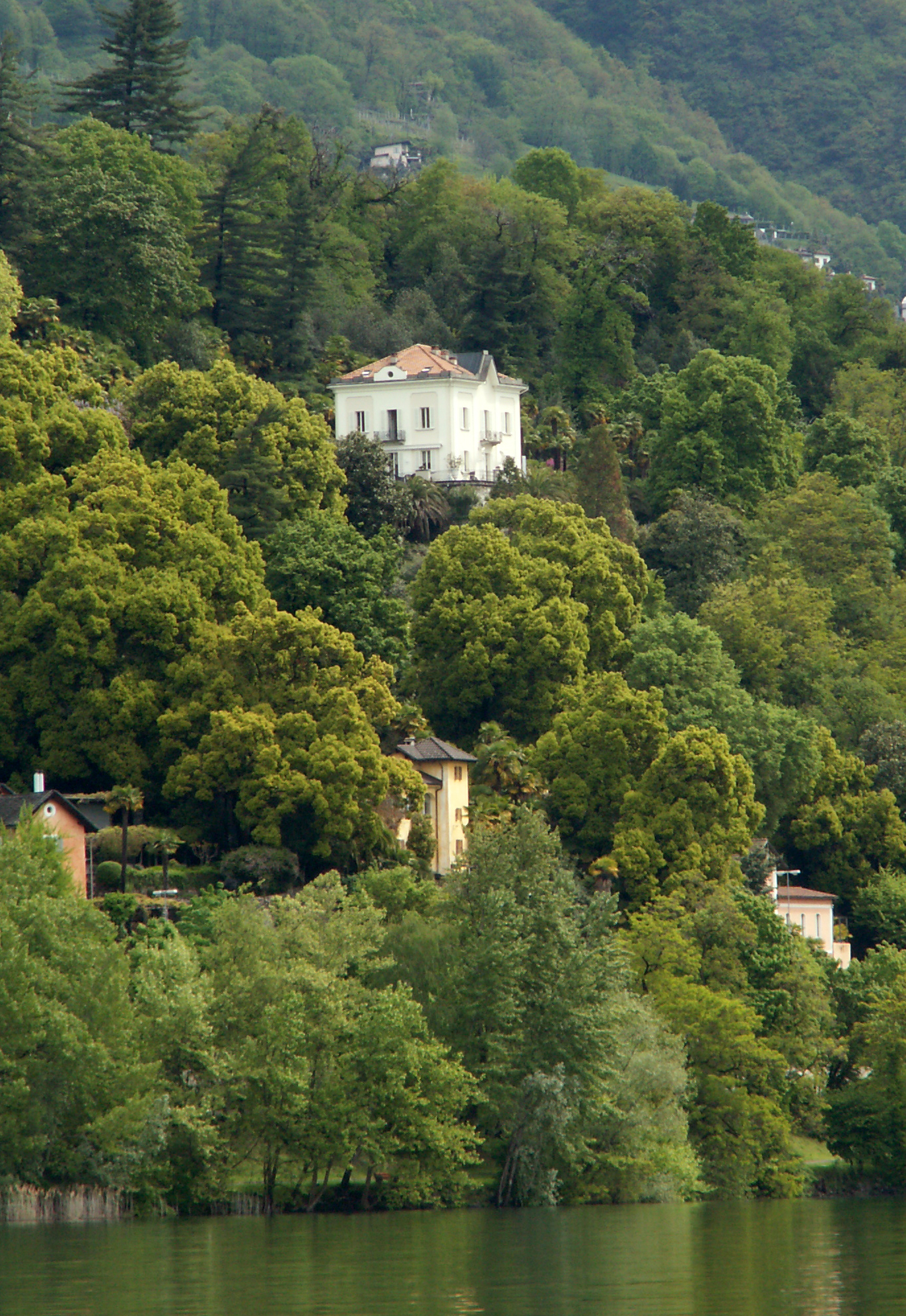
La Baronata on Lake Locarno

As an activist prior to his exile Mroczkowski was regarded as a democrat and an apostle of the Emancipation of serfs. On a trip to Florence in 1865 he met Mikhail Bakunin who befriended him and suggested he accompany him on a trip to Naples. There he was introduced to princess Zoë Sumarokov, (born 1828). She was the estranged wife of Prince Alexei Obolensky with whom she had six children, and was living with them among revolutionaries escaped from Russia. She would become Mroczkowski's lover and later his wife and have two children with him.

While staying on Ischia with Bakunin in 1866, Mroczkowski together with his now partner, Zoë, produced a French translation of the Revolutionary Catechism, Bakunin's founding text for the secret "international revolutionary society" they were planning. Bakunin's Pet name for Mroczkowski was the affectionate diminutive, "Mrouk". In Polish "mruk" means the "grunter" or the "silent one".

=== A Swiss interlude ===
In 1867, they decided to settle in Switzerland. Initially they stayed in Vevey, then in Geneva. There they met the French geographer and theorist, Élisée Reclus, whose daughter would later become the companion of the Mroczkowskis' son, Felix. In 1868 having become members of the First Internationale and then of the central committee of the League of Peace and Freedom, after the schism in the aftermath of the Berne Convention, Mroczkowski and Bakunin formed a group to oppose the ideology of Karl Marx.
Mroczkowski was also involved in drawing up plans for the refurbishment of the villa, La Baronata perched above Lake Maggiore, a retirement retreat built for Carlo Cafiero, who initially "gave" it to Bakunin, but on discovering that his fortune was leaching away, was able to get it back.

=== London episode ===
In 1869 they left Switzerland and travelled as a couple to London and for about two years moved there in revolutionary circles that included people such as Karl Marx and Walery Wroblewski

== A new career in photography ==
Since Prince Obolensky had forcibly abducted his children from his wife, Zoë, in 1869, her income dropped considerably. Having left Switzerland and now London, Mroczkowki and Zoë took up residence in Menton. There in 1871 Mroczkowski opened a photographic studio as "Walerian M.Ostroga", specialising in portraits. Eventually, he split his time working in Trouville-sur-Mer during the Summer and Menton in Winter. Living in two places enabled him to justify extensive travel and disguise his anarchist activities. Work as a photographer helped him keep his family – his Common-law marriage to Zoë and their two children, Félix (1867–1936) and Léonie (1871–1947). They were finally married after the death of Prince Alexei Vasilievitch, Zoe's husband, and were able to buy a villa, "les mouettes", that became "villa Ostroga".

Walery Mroczkowski/Valerien Ostroga died on 1 October 1889 in Paris and was buried in the Vieux-Château cemetery in Menton. His children and descendants adopted the surname "Ostroga", being easier to write and pronounce in French.

== Gallery ==
Photos by Valerien Ostroga

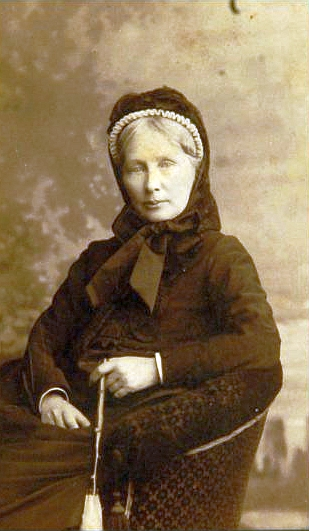
Alexandra Obolenskaya née Djakov, sister-in-law of Zoë (1879)

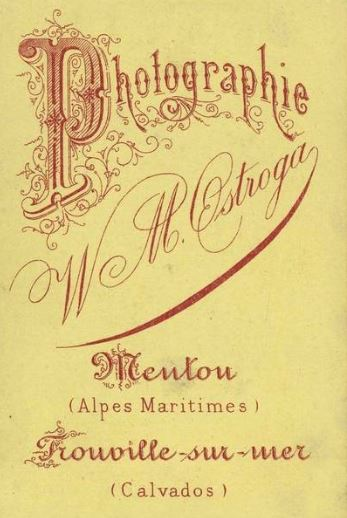
Business addresses on the back of an Ostroga Cabinet card

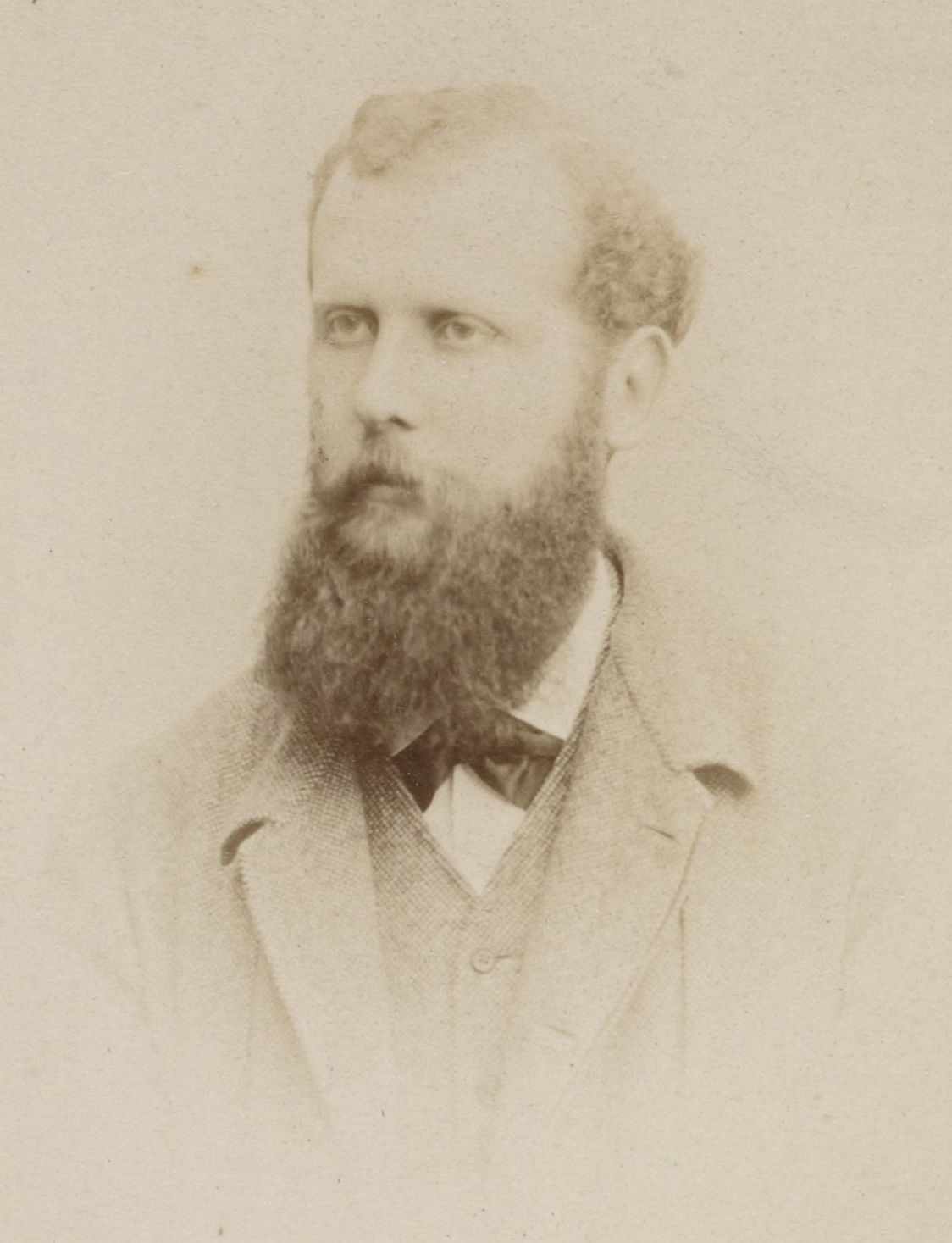
Paul Mirabaud (1880)

== Bibliography ==
- Mroczkowski Walery (1840–1889) powstaniec 1863, emigrant. Polski Słownik Biograficzny vol. 22 p. 185
- Laskowski, Piotr. (2016) "Jedyny wybitny bakuninowiec"- Walerian Mroczkowski (1840–1889) dans Studia z Dziejów Anarchizmu (2) w Dwusetleciu Urodzin Michała Bakunina.' Red. Skrzycki, Radosław. Szczecin: Wydawnictwo Naukowe Uniwersytetu Szczecińskiego. ISBN 978-83-7972-056-9 p. 81–122.

== See also ==
- Suwałki Governorate
