= Polish Hearth Club =

Private members' club in London UK

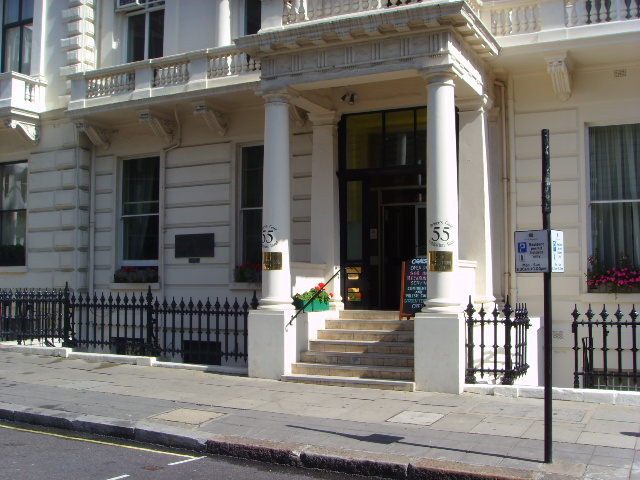
- Polish Hearth Club at 55 Princes Gate, Exhibition Road, London
- Alternative names: Ognisko Polskie

General information
- Status: Private members' club
- Type: Victorian terrace
- Architectural style: Highly ornate italianate
- Location: 55 Princes Gate, Exhibition Road; London, SW7
- Groundbreaking: 1867
- Completed: 1869
- Opened: 1940

Design and construction
- Architect: William Tasker ?
- Architecture firm: Charles James Freake
- Main contractor: C.J. Freake

Website
- ogniskopolskie.org.uk

The Polish Hearth (Polish: Ognisko Polskie) is a members' club founded soon after the outbreak of the Second World War by the British Government and the Polish government-in-exile at 55 Princes Gate, Exhibition Road in the City of Westminster, London, close to the South Kensington museums, in a Grade II listed building. It was intended as a social meeting place for diplomats, the military cadre and other officials. The facilities included a restaurant, (now leased), a theatre and an exhibition space. It faces the main entrance to Imperial College London and is around the corner from the Polish Institute and Sikorski Museum, which was built as part of one development by Charles James Freake.

== History ==
Ognisko Polskie (Polish Hearth) was jointly founded by the British government and the Polish government-in-exile in 1939. On 16 July 1940 the club was formally inaugurated by Prince George, Duke of Kent with the assistance of members of the Polish government, president Władysław Raczkiewicz and prime minister and Chief of staff general Władyslaw Sikorski in the presence of foreign secretary Lord Halifax, Howard Kennard, British ambassador to Poland and Count Edward Raczyński Polish ambassador to the United Kingdom and chairman of the British Council, Lord Lloyd. The building was blessed by the Polish Field Chaplain, bishop Józef Gawlina.

The club became the cultural and social centre of independent Polish émigré life. General Władysław Anders had his own table in the restaurant.

=== Second World War and after ===
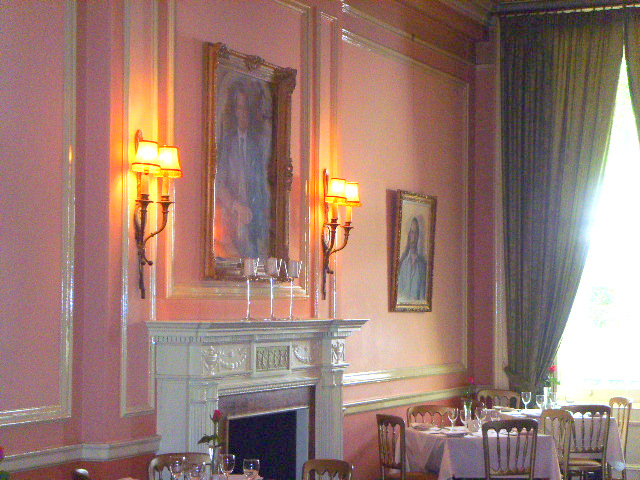
Ognisko restaurant before make-over

The club is the only survivor of several Polish social establishments in West London that began during World War II and were in the vicinity of the temporary Polish parish that was hosted by the Oratorian Fathers at Brompton Oratory and assumed greater significance after the war with the passing of the Polish Resettlement Act 1947, when some 200,000 Polish veterans reached British shores. Throughout the ensuing years, Ognisko was not only a meeting place for Polish government ministers and officials, it also hosted Poland's exiled intellectual elite. Notable survivors of Poland's inter-war musical theatre and cabaret scene, including Marian Hemar, Feliks Konarski, Renata Bogdańska, Irena Delmar and Zofia Terné, revived their productions for the Ognisko stage. Its basement hosted in the 1960s and 70s a youth club: "Pod Pegazem".

The other Polish social clubs that have disappeared or have been amalgamated were: Hemar's "Orzeł Biały" (The White Eagle Café-Club) in Knightsbridge, "Samopomoc Marynarki Wojennej" (The Polish Naval Club), on Chelsea Embankment (later in Wetherby Gardens, SW5), "Klub Lotników polskich" (Polish Airforce Club) in Collingham Gardens, SW5, "Stowarzyszenie Polskich Kombatantów" (SPK) (the Polish Combatants Association, part of a UK-wide network) in Queen's Gate Terrace.

The commemorative booklet published on the twenty-fifth anniversary of the club announced: "In a four storey stucco villa, characteristic of Victorian London, with its pilastered entrance at 55 Princes Gate, a building in the hands of the Relief Society for Poles, there is a Polish Hearth, an institution very like a metropolitan Polish club. It differs from its neighbours in the terrace, because of its generous bronze plaque, a tribute to the tragic Hungarian Revolution of 1956. The plaque was placed on the facade of Ognisko Polskie on behalf of Hungarian exiles and depicts Hungarians marching towards Soviet tanks. The bas-relief is the work of Hungarian artist Ferenc Kovacs and represents the patriotic Hungarian nation and its deep respect for freedom.”

As the Polish community in London either emigrated to third countries or settled elsewhere in the UK, those who remained in the capital tended to move south or westward to areas such as Hammersmith, Ealing and Balham, where house prices were more accessible. In the 1970s the community had raised sufficient funds to build the Polish Social and Cultural Centre (POSK) in Hammersmith. To a degree Ognisko and POSK became rivals for the support a diminishing Polish community, until the next century.

=== Dispersal and decline of the diaspora ===
With the decline of war-time and post-war émigrés, by the start of the 21st century, the Club's future became uncertain. The building came close to being sold off to developers in 2011 by some members of the committee with an eye for the main chance, but the membership roused itself into action and saved this popular venue for a new generation.

== Successful revival ==
A new committee brought in contemporary management skills to rejuvenate the venue. The bar and dining room are leased to restaurateur Jan Woroniecki. Portraits of prominent Poles and British people adorn the walls. Theatrical productions, concerts and exhibitions have resumed on the first floor of the building attracting a British audience boosted by the arrival of a new generation of EU Poles.

== Presidents of the Polish Hearth Club ==
- Frank Savery (1940–1949)
- Jan Baliński-Jundziłł (1949–1973)
- Lieut. col. Kamil Bogumił Czarnecki (1974–1976)
- Eugeniusz Lubomirski de Vaux (1976–1981)
- Gen. Jerzy Morawicz (1981–1985)
- Gen. Jan Gawlikowski (1985–1987)
- Lieut. col. Kamil Czarnecki (1978–1988)
- Felix Laski (1988–1989)
- Jerzy Kulczycki (1989–1990)
- Włodzimierz "Włodek" Anthony Christopher Mier-Jędrzejowicz (1990–1991)
- Felix Laski (1991–1992)
- Andrzej Morawicz (1992–2012)
- Barbara Kaczmarowska-Hamilton (2012–2013)
- Jerzy Kulczycki (2013)
- Col. Nicholas Kelsey (2013–2018)
- Dr Jan Falkowski (2018–2021)
- Prof Jerzy Kolankiewicz (2021–2022)
- Andrzej Jurenko (2022-2026)
- Jan Wisniewski (2026-2027)

== See also ==
- Poles in the United Kingdom
