= Polish Social and Cultural Centre =

United Kingdom Polish cultural organisation

Coordinates: 51°29′36″N 0°14′15″W

POSK
- Polish Social and Cultural Association
- Polski Ośrodek Społeczno-Kulturalny
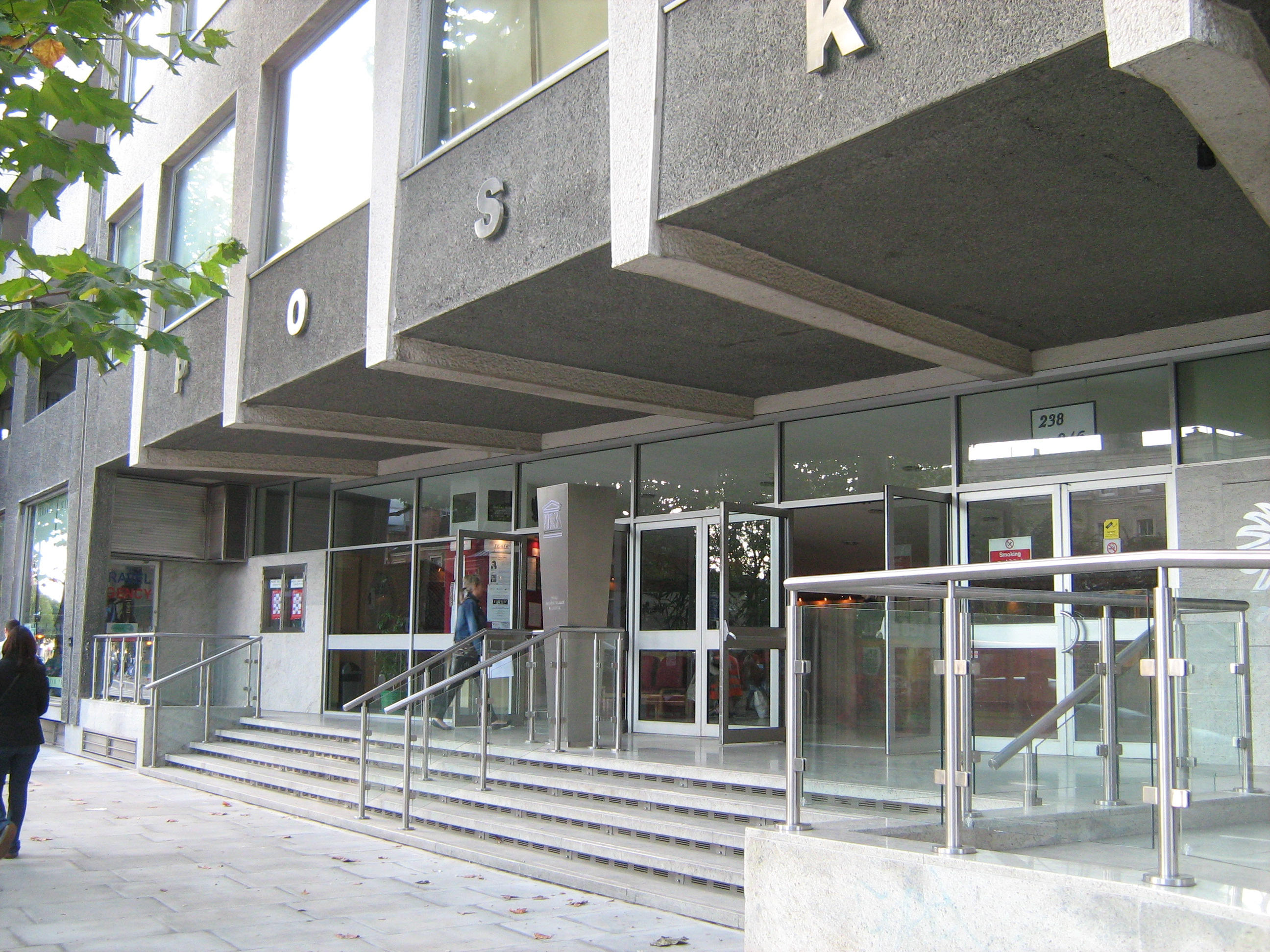
- The POSK building in Hammersmith, London, UK
- Abbreviation: POSK
- Formation: 1967
- Type: cultural centre
- Purpose: Furthering the understanding of Polish culture, history and art
- Headquarters: 238–246, King Street, London, W6 0RF
- Region served: United Kingdom
- Official language: English and Polish
- Website: posk.org/en

The Polish Social and Cultural Centre (Polish: Polski Ośrodek Społeczno-Kulturalny; POSK) is a Polish cultural centre in west London, England. It was founded in 1967 and funded by public subscription, on the initiative of Polish engineer Roman Wajda, at 238–246 King Street, Hammersmith.

The rationale was that during the Cold War, the Polish community in the United Kingdom was politically opposed to the Polish Communist authorities in its native country and could not otherwise avail itself of a continuous source of Polish history and culture and for potential future generations in exile. It replaced the venues of a number of distinct military, veterans and social associations and meeting places that had been scattered mainly across the Royal Borough of Kensington in the aftermath of World War II.

As Poles who had escaped the occupation of their country began to move westwards in London from the "bedsitter land" to which they were first confined, Wajda and his committee made precise calculations as to where such a facility would best serve the Polish community of the time. In its proximity is the Polish parish and "garrison church", St Andrew Bobola, in nearby Shepherd's Bush.

POSK presents and promotes Polish culture and history to the British public. It houses the Polish Library in London, which was founded in 1942, and an art exhibition space. It puts on film screenings, theatrical productions and musical recitals, including opera. It has a jazz club with regular sessions. The 300 capacity theatre is fully equipped with audio loop and subtitle function. The theatre is available for hire by other community groups when not in use. POSK also houses a Polish cafe - Cafe Maya, a restaurant and Members bar. There is an independent Polish bookshop on the premises.

Several Polish organizations are based at the centre, including:

- The Federation of Poles in Great Britain – the largest Polish organisation in Britain which itself hosts a number of other organisations, Zjednoczenie Polskie w Wielkiej Brytanii – ZPWB
- Jozef Pilsudski Institute in London, Instytut Józefa Piłsudskiego
- Polish Educational Society - PES, Polska Macierz Szkolna
- Polska Fundacja Kulturalna, Polish Cultural Foundation, publishers
- Polish University Abroad – PUNO
- Polish Society of Arts and Sciences Abroad, Polskie Towarzystwo Naukowe na Obczyźnie – PTNO
- Polish Veterans Association, Stowarzyszenie Polskich Kombatantów – SPK
- Tydzień Polski, successor to Dziennik Polski, "The Polish Daily", Britain's oldest Polish language newspaper.

The original membership fee of £10 was raised in 2008 by the new President, Ewa Brzeska, it now stands at £60.

On 26 June 2016 the front entrance of the centre was vandalised with graffiti. It was treated as a potential hate crime by the Metropolitan Police. It was seen by some as an expression of anti-Polish sentiment in the wake of the Brexit referendum and cited as an expression of anti-immigration views targeting Poles and other EU nationals. No one has been charged with the offence and debate continued about whether the graffiti could be interpreted as ambiguous or whether there were other factors suggesting the motives behind the graffiti were not necessarily xenophobic.

== See also ==
- Poles in the United Kingdom
- Polish Catholic Mission
- Polish Institute and Sikorski Museum
- Divine Mercy College
- Holy Family of Nazareth Convent School
- West End Baptist Church
