= Polish Educational Society =

United Kingdom Polish educational society

- Polska Macierz Szkolna
- Logo in Polish
- Established: 1953; 73 years ago
- Registration no.: 1159980
- Legal status: Charity

The Polish Educational Society, in Polish, Polska Macierz Szkolna, is a London-based charitable organisation founded in 1953 with the aim of supplementing Polish children's education abroad with exposure to Polish language, history and culture, through the provision of "Saturday Schools". It also aimed to regulate the curriculum, train teachers and commission teaching materials and books and prepare young people for British public examinations in Polish language and literature. It is a registered charity (no. 1159980) and a company limited by guarantee. Its registered office and library are at the Polish Social and Cultural Centre in Hammersmith.

The initiative for the project came, among others, from gen. Władysław Anders. Following the Polish Resettlement Act 1947, Polish young people born in Poland and others born to Polish parents in camps in many countries during WWII and who had missed out on schooling, arrived in the United Kingdom. They were soon joined by children born to the thousands of displaced persons who had settled in the country and many of whom chose to maintain cultural roots and language within their families. Given the political situation in post-war Europe, human and cultural ties were permanently severed for many. To answer the need for supplementary formal education, a network of schools was set up under the auspices of the Society, usually attached to Polish parishes, and located in church halls or in Catholic schools unoccupied on Saturdays.

In 2023 the Society commemorated its 70th year of operation in the British Isles.

== See also ==
- Divine Mercy College
- Holy Family of Nazareth Convent School
- Polish Catholic Mission
- Polish University Abroad
