= Radio Vanessa =

Polish radio station

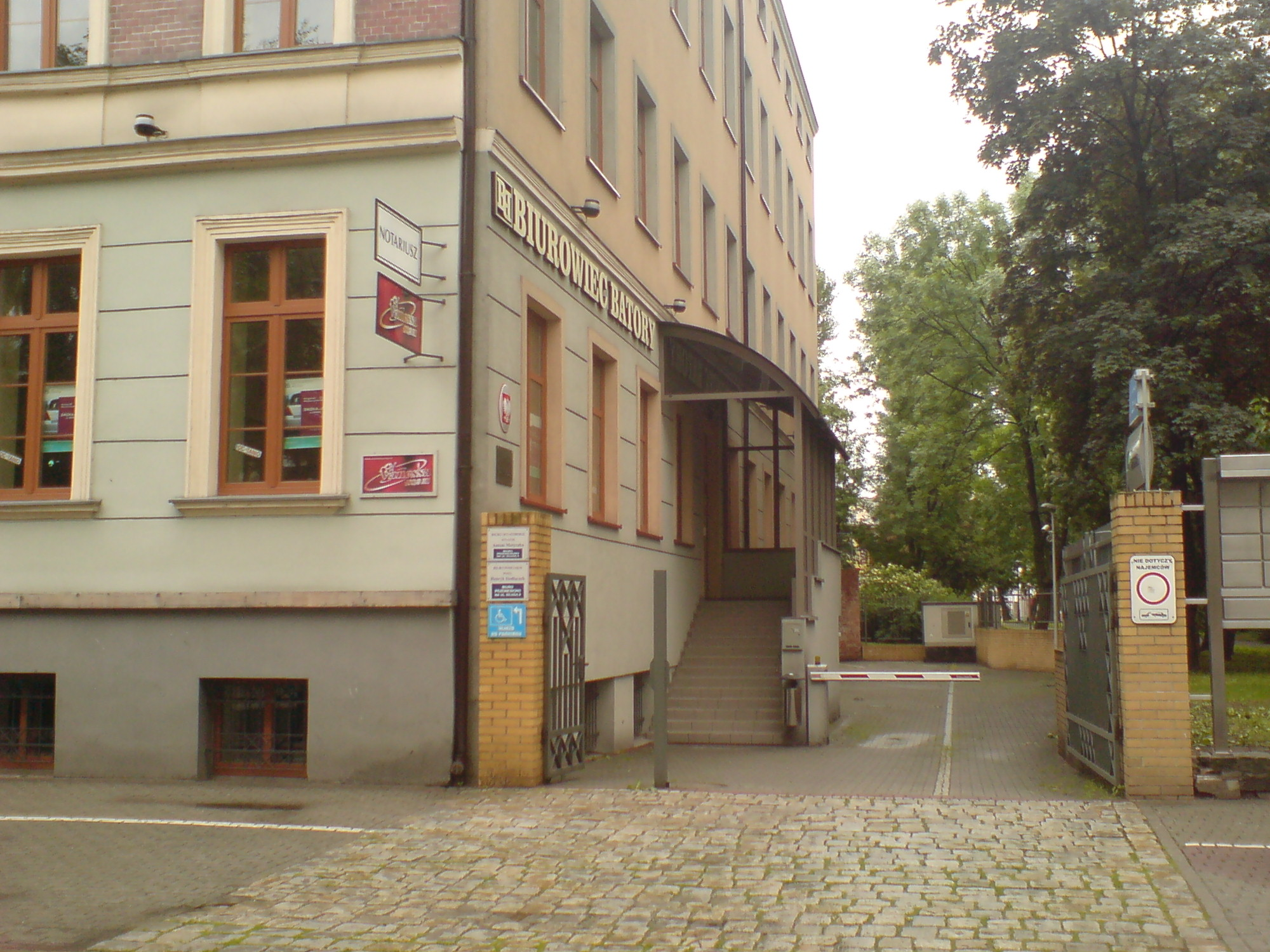
- Radio Vanessa headquarters

Racibórz, Poland; Poland
- Broadcast area: Silesian Voivodeship and Opole Voivodeship
- Frequencies: 100.3 MHz – Racibórz; 95.8 MHz – Krapkowice; 94.9 MHz – Olesno

Programming
- Languages: Polish, Silesian
- Format: CHR, music and news

Ownership
- Owner: Radio VANESSA Sp. z o.o.

History
- Founded: 5 June 1994

Links
- Website: vanessa.fm

Radio Vanessa is a local Polish radio station primarily associated with Racibórz, where its headquarters are located, and its surrounding areas. Founded on 5 June 1994, it broadcasts on the frequencies 100.3 MHz (Racibórz), 95.8 MHz (Krapkowice), and 94.9 MHz (Olesno), as well as online via its website. The station's radio format is CHR, complemented by regular news updates throughout the day. Its slogan is Na każdy dzień! (For every day!).

== History ==
Radio Vanessa was established on 5 June 1994, with Arkadiusz Ekiert, a co-founder, serving as its first editor-in-chief. Initially a regional station, it gained a global reach through online streaming while retaining its local focus. The station's first headquarters were on the top floor of the Mieszko S.A. building, a former water tower. It later relocated to Bukowa Street in central Racibórz, and since 2004, its headquarters have been at 5 Stefan Batory Street.

During the 1997 Millennium Flood, Radio Vanessa was a critical source of information for residents, collaborating with the flood response team to provide updates on flooded areas, missing persons, and evacuation efforts. It broadcast information from health, electricity, and gas authorities, as well as psychologists, suspending its regular programming and advertisements. After the flood, it continued reporting on recovery efforts. For its efforts, the station received the Niptel Award in 1997. It played a similar role during the 2010 spring floods, achieving record website visits.

== Broadcast coverage ==
=== Strzybnik transmitter ===
The station broadcasts at 100.3 MHz with an ERP of 3 kW from a transmitter in Strzybnik, near Racibórz. The antenna, positioned 45 meters AGL, emits an omnidirectional signal in vertical polarization and supports RDS. The signal covers the entire Racibórz County, reaching distant cities such as Wodzisław Śląski, Żory, Rybnik, Jastrzębie-Zdrój, Kędzierzyn-Koźle, Cieszyn, Ustroń, and Wisła, as well as nearby Czech border towns.

=== Krapkowice transmitter ===
A second transmitter in Krapkowice, Opole Voivodeship, operates at 95.8 MHz with an ERP of 1 kW, located on the chimney of Metsä Tissue Paper Mills.

=== Internet ===
The station streams online via its website, supporting playback through Winamp, Windows Media Player, and QuickTime. The stream uses the AAC+ format with a bit rate of 32 kbps in stereo.

== Listenership ==
In Q3 2008, Radio Vanessa ranked outside the top 25 radio stations in the Katowice urban area, with a listenership share below 0.2%.

== Silesian channel ==
In addition to its main channel, Radio Vanessa offers Śląski kanał (Silesian Channel), a 24/7 online-only station targeting Silesians, featuring programs in the Silesian language and Silesian music hits, with the same streaming parameters as the main channel.

== Selected programs ==
Radio Vanessa airs various radio programs, including news, music, and contests. Key programs include:

- Serwis informacyjny (News Bulletin): Hourly news updates from 6:00 AM to 10:00 PM (7:00 AM–10:00 PM on Saturdays, 7:00 AM–8:00 PM on Sundays), including weather forecasts, traffic reports, sports news, local updates, morning press reviews, job listings, and daily calendars.
- Biesiada Śląska (Silesian Feast): A Sunday program from 12:00 PM to 4:00 PM, hosted by Piotr Scholz (Pyjter), focusing on Silesian folklore and dialect, pioneered as the first such radio program.
- VIP Mixer: A gossip magazine featuring celebrity news, trends, and curiosities between music tracks.
- Bilet do kina (Cinema Ticket): Since 2000, this program covers film releases, reviews, soundtracks, series, and includes contests and interviews.
- Dzieci mówią (Children Speak): A humorous program featuring authentic interviews with children on serious or adult-oriented topics.
- Autoekspert (Auto Expert): A motoring magazine with columns, test reports, tuning advice, driver tips, and car model showcases.
- Muzyczna Machina (Music Machine): A weekday music program from 6:00 PM to 11:00 PM, featuring dance, house, and trance music, hosted by Krzysztof Łucki (DJ Black), with listener SMS shout-outs.
- House Sessions: A Tuesday program after 9:00 PM, dedicated to house music.
- Magazyn sportowy (Sports Magazine): A program covering regional sports, including event reports, interviews, and columns on popular disciplines.
