= Wedding of the Weddings =

Polish non-alcoholic wedding movement

Wedding of the Weddings is an annual meeting of couples who have had alcohol-free wedding receptions. The meetings have taken place in various cities in Poland since 1995. Couples come together with their children to have an all-night alcohol-free dancing party, to exchange experience on organizing alcohol-free parties for children, youth and adults and to spend several days together enjoying the local culture.

== The event ==
Wedding of the Weddings is a multi-layered event. There are conferences usually held at a local university, with invited talks by researchers on family issues (relationships, raising children, alcohol-free weddings and other family events) and with contributions of participants. There are meetings and discussions with representatives of the local government who are responsible for family support and for alcohol-related problems. A social program is offered including sports, sightseeing tours, field trips and picnics. Performances by folk singers and folk dancers as well as pop stars accompany the meetings.

The major event of each Wedding of the Weddings follows a traditional wedding rite. In the evening, there is a Holy Mass at the local cathedral, where a bishop blesses each couple after confirmation of the marital vow. Following is a wedding parade through the streets of the town to the restaurant, where a reception takes place. The reception starts with a polonaise, an old Polish aristocratic dance, lasting until 4:00 am with dancing and games for participants led by professional entertainers.

== History ==
The Reverend Władysław Zązel, provost of a small parish in Kamesznica, became famous for spreading the tradition of alcohol-free wedding receptions. In his parish, more than 90% of all wedding receptions were celebrated without alcohol. In 1995, he was invited by Radio Maryja (a well-known Catholic radio station) to tell listeners about his experience with alcohol-free weddings. Listeners from around the country called the radio station to say that alcohol-free weddings were organized by many individuals. Zązel proposed organizing a meeting of those who had had alcohol-free weddings. The meetings were called Wedding of the Weddings.

The first two such meetings were organized in Zązel's parish in Kamesznica, then in Zamość, Częstochowa, Kraków, Białystok, Koszęcin, Ludźmierz, Warsaw, Olsztyn, Wrocław, Bydgoszcz, Tarnów, Łomża, Miejsce Piastowe, Radom, Kraków, Wieleń Zaobrzański and again Kamesznica, then in Krynica-Zdrój and Myczkowce. The 2017 event took place in Trąbki Wielkie and Gdańsk, while the 2018 meeting was hosted by Ludźmierz. In 1999, Zązel went with alcohol-free couples to Rome, where they were blessed by Pope John Paul II.

== Speakers and preachers ==
Among the speakers, who usually come from the local communities, there also some prominent and well-known ones in Poland, such as:

- Cardinal Archbishop Franciszek Macharski of Kraków,
- Cardinal Archbishop Stanisław Dziwisz of Kraków,
- Cardinal Zenon Grocholewski from the Vatican,
- Archbishop Wojciech Ziemba of Białystok,
- Archbishop Edmund Michał Piszcz of Warmia,
- Archbishop Józef Michalik of Przemyśl, President of the Polish Episcopal Conference,
- Archbishop Stanisław Gądecki of Poznań,
- Archbishop Marek Jędraszewski of Kraków,
- Bishop Jan Tyrawa of Bydgoszcz,
- Bishop Stanisław Stefanek of Łomża,
- Bishop Antoni Pacyfik Dydycz of Drohiczyn,
- Bishop Henryk Tomasik of Radom,
- Bishop Andrzej Jeż of Tarnów,
- Bishop Jan Wątroba of Rzeszów,
- Bishop Edward Materski from Radom,
- Bishop Józef Zawitkowski from Łowicz,
- Bishop Marian Duś from Warsaw,
- Bishop Jan Szkodoń from Kraków,
- Bishop Grzegorz Ryś from Kraków,
- Bishop Andrzej Siemieniewski from Wrocław,
- Bishop Wiesław Lechowicz from Tarnów,
- Bishop Tadeusz Bronakowski from Łomża,
- Bishop Kazimierz Górny of Rzeszów,
- Bishop Adam Szal from Przemyśl,
- Bishop Piotr Greger from Bielsko-Biała/Żywiec,
- Bishop Wiesław Szlachetka from Gdańsk,
- Pater professor Jacek Hadryś, theologist at Poznań University,
- Pater professor Karol Meissner, specialist in sexology,
- Pater professor Aleksander Posacki, specialist in demonology, occultism and sects,
- Pater professor Janusz Królikowski, specialist in dogmatic theology,
- Pater Leon Knabit, specialist in theology
- Pater Jan Reczek, specialist in internal healing
- Pater Dr. Marcin Kołodziej, specialist in liturgy
- Pater Dr. Franciszek Płonka, specialist in liturgy
- Pater Józef Walusiak, specialist in the treatment of addiction
- Professor Andrzej Urbaniak, computer scientist, Poznań University of Technology,
- Professor Zofia Włodarczyk, specialist in botany, Biblical biology and gardening, Hugon Kołłątaj Agricultural University of Cracow,
- Dr. Mieczysław Guzewicz, doctor of theology, specialist in marriage issues
- Dr. Andrzej Dakowicz of University of Białystok,
- Dr. Krzysztof A. Wojcieszek, psychologist at the Bogdan Janicki University,
- Dr. Eng. Antoni Zieba, engineer at the Kraków University of Technology,
- Dr. Andrzej Gołębiowski, of Radom University of Technology,
- Dr. Eng. Jacek Pulikowski, of the Poznań University of Technology,
- Dr. Marek Babik, from the Kraków Ignatianum University, specialist in child rearing,
- Dr. Stanisław Bogaczewicz, historian at the Institute of National Memory,
- Mr. Krzysztof Brzózka, from The National Agency for Alcohol Problems Solution (PARPA)
- Mr. Andrzej Wronka, specialist on Catholic apologetics, and many others.

== Artists ==
Folk singers and dancers as well as orchestras from the Polish mountains (Gorals) attend the majority of events. Folk groups from other regions appear occasionally as well, including from Kujawy, Kurpie, Radom area and Silesia. Former and current pop stars frequently hold concerts, including Magda Anioł and her band, Antonina Krzysztoń, Viola Brzezińska with the group New Day, as well as Jarosław Wajk, a former vocalist in the rock band Oddział Zamknięty, and Jan Budziaszek of the band Skaldowie.

== Alcohol-free weddings ==
A central reason for the Wedding of the Weddings event is the general resistance to weddings where no alcohol is served. To combat the feeling of being strangers in culture and in Polish society, many couples seeking alcohol-free weddings also seek out other like-minded people with whom to socialize and celebrate.

Non-alcoholic weddings differ from those where alcohol is served. The wedding ceremony is usually extended by the reading of a special blessing (and acknowledgement) from the local bishop. The wedding reception is not only exceptional due to the absence of alcohol, but it is also marked by other traditions and attractions. As toasts in Poland are almost by definition associated with alcohol, they are either removed entirely or replaced by table speeches, goat's milk toasts, and songs in honor of the married couple and their parents. As Polish wedding receptions are usually all-night events, usually the alcohol plays a role in keeping the guests amused late at night. A non-alcoholic wedding differs significantly as dishes are served regularly, must be of comparable quality all the time, the orchestra plays the entire time, and the party features various group dances such as the polonaise, line dances, travel dances, skill dances (Zorba dance, mountain folk dances), games and competitions for the participants. Usually professional entertainers, who have undertaken special courses for alcohol-free party entertainment (wodzirej) are employed during the reception to organize and run the entertainment program.

The vast majority of non-alcoholic weddings are organized by teetotalers (not to be confused with recovering alcoholics).

== Non-alcoholic lifestyle ==
Another aspect shared by the participants of the Wedding of the Weddings is the non-alcoholic lifestyle. All family parties, such as birthdays or family name days, meetings with friends or friends of children, New Year's parties, church-associated celebrations (baptisms, first communion, weddings, funerals) are organized without alcohol.

Moreover, the couples and their children are also frequently engaged in temperance societies.

== See also ==
- Temperance bar
- Temperance movement
