= St Andrew Bobola Church, Hammersmith =

Church in London, England

St Andrew's Polish RC Church
- St Andrew Bobola Polish Roman Catholic Church
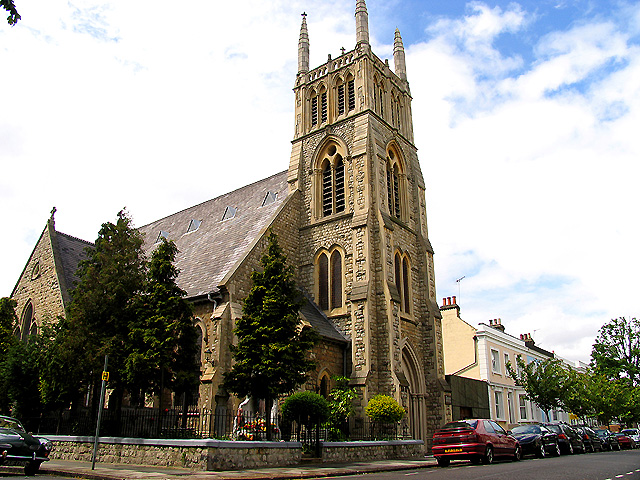
- St Andrew Bobola Church in Leysfield Road

- Location within London Borough of Hammersmith and Fulham Location within Greater London
- 51.5009°N 0.2378°W
- Location: 1, Leysfield Road Shepherd's Bush, W 12 London Borough of Hammersmith and Fulham
- Country: England
- Denomination: Roman Catholic
- Website: https://bobola.church/en/

History
- Former name: St Andrew's Presbyterian Church
- Status: Active
- Founded: 1869
- Founder: Divisional general Archbishop Józef Gawlina in 1962
- Dedication: St. Andrew Bobola

Architecture
- Functional status: Parish Church
- Architect: Edmund Woodthorpe
- Style: Gothic Revival
- Groundbreaking: 1869
- Completed: 1870
- Closed: 1960

Administration
- Province: Polish Catholic Mission
- Archdiocese: Westminster
- Parish: West London Polish Community

Clergy
- Archbishop: Most Rev. Vincent Nichols

St Andrew Bobola Church, Hammersmith (Polish: Kościół św. Andrzeja Boboli) also known as the Polish Church in Shepherd's Bush is a Roman Catholic parish church serving the Polish community in West London. The building was designed in Gothic Revival style by Edmund Woodthorpe, and stands at 1 Leysfield Road, close to Ravenscourt Park.

== History ==
The church, originally founded in 1869 for the Scottish Presbyterian community, was dedicated to St Andrew the Apostle, patron of Scotland. It was constructed in the then fashionable Neo Gothic style as laid out by architect Edmund Woodthorpe (1814-1887). It was consecrated in 1870. With the passage of time, the congregation declined and in circa 1960 it was decided to amalgamate it with a more active presbyterian parish elsewhere. The church authorities therefore sought to dispose of their asset to another Christian faith community. In 1961 the church was bought by the Polish Catholic Mission to the United Kingdom, with a mortgage, paid off in time with the help of donations and legacies from the faithful.

The church was re-dedicated in 1962, this time to another St Andrew in the Archdiocese of Westminster. Historically, it became only the second Catholic church to serve the capital's Polish community. The first Polish church in London was opened in Devonia Road, Islington, dedicated to Our Lady of Częstochowa and St Casimir. It became the first Polish-owned ecclesiastical building in the British Isles. It was consecrated on 30 October 1930 by cardinal August Hlond, primate of Poland in the presence of Cardinal Bourne of Westminster.

The Bobola congregation in West London was initially made up largely of people who had survived the trials of Siberia during and after World War II. It also served unofficially, as a Garrison Church for the thousands of Polish veterans, who had fought with the allies and were deprived of the right to return to their Polish homeland, surrendered to the USSR under the Yalta Agreement. From 1961 to 1979 Monsignor Kazimierz Sołowiej (1912–1979) was the parish priest. He took charge of the refurbishment of the building. Despite an "uneventful" exterior, the interior of the church was, according to Bridget Cherry, "daringly modernised" by émigré Polish craftsmen and artists under the direction of designer Aleksander Klecki. It contains many items inspired by Polish art and religious devotions.

To the right of the entrance (when facing the church from the exterior) is the Lady chapel dedicated to Our Lady of Kozielsk, whose original image in Poland was crowned by Pope John Paul II in 1997.

The pipe organ is situated on the liturgical west gallery and was built in 1901 by Henry Jones and Sons of London. The instrument maintains the original tubular pneumatic action and comprises 18 stops over two manuals and pedals. The organ is featured in a video recording of Bach Prelude and Fugue in D Minor BMV554 performed by leading British organist Jonathan Scott (Scott Brothers Duo). The recording from 6th June 2025 is available on YouTube.

The church is considered a building of architectural heritage. It is listed with the Hammersmith and Fulham Historic Buildings Group. In 2008 the parish priest was presented with a prestigious conservation award for the Church from the Hammersmith Society.

=== Smolensk Air disaster ===
The parish and the entire Polish community in West London were shocked and saddened to learn that the fourth parish priest of St Andrew's, Mgr. Bronisław Gostomski had died in the Smolensk air disaster on 10 April 2010. He had been aboard the Polish Airforce Russian-built Tupolev Tu-154 aircraft carrying the delegation of notable Poles intending to visit the Katyn site on the 70th anniversary of the Massacre, when the plane crashed near the Russian city of Smolensk. There were no survivors and the cause of the disaster remains unexplained.

== Commemorations ==
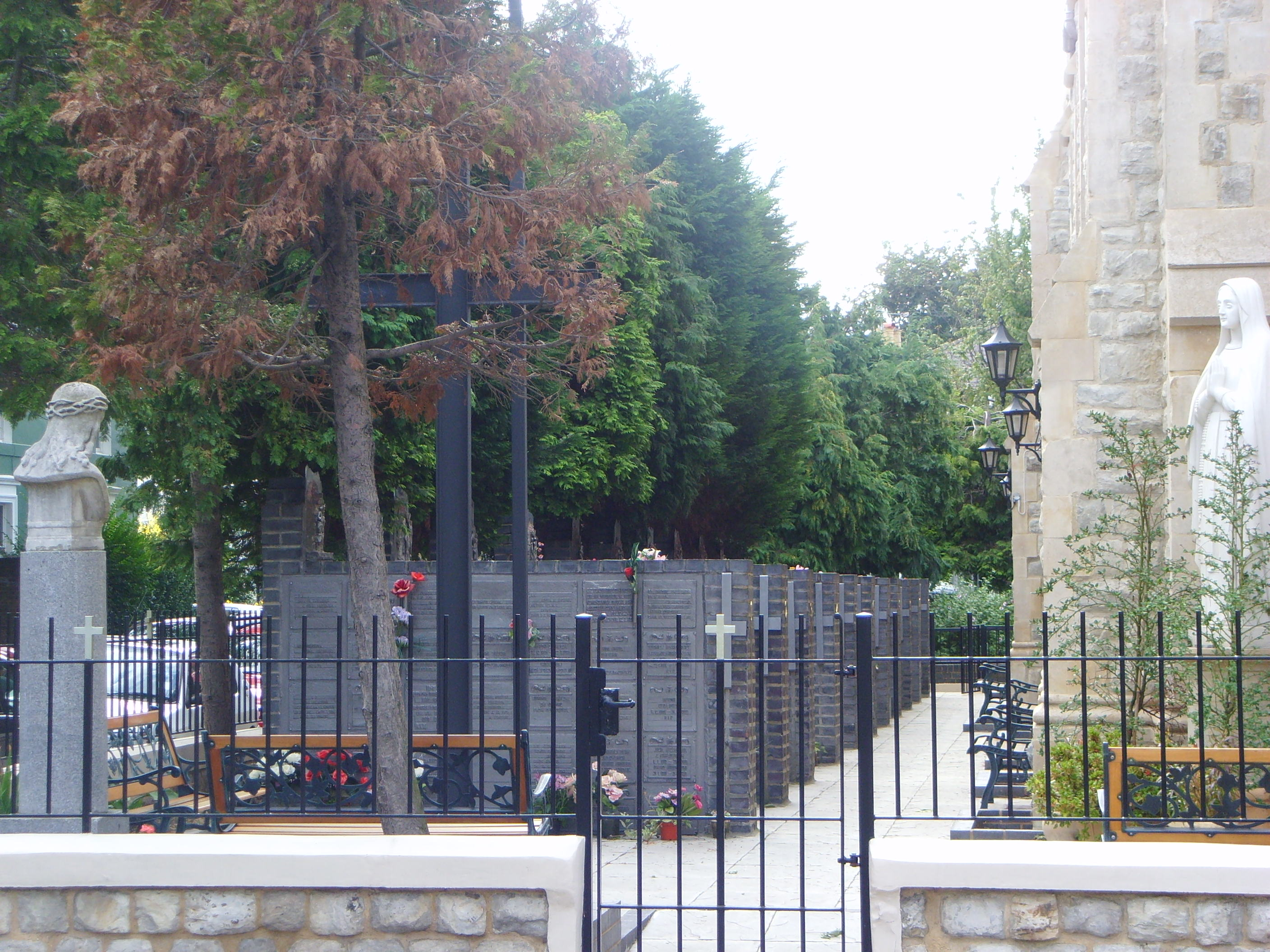
Garden of Remembrance to the side of St Andrew Bobola church

Because the authorities in Communist Poland would have forbidden any commemorations of Poland's struggle against the USSR, the only way to remember the fallen was to institute such memorials in the then Free World. Hence there are over 80 memorial plaques in the church building. The first to be installed on 24 November 1963 was a plaque designed by Stefan Jan Baran in honour of the Lwow Eaglets ("Orleta lwowskie"). On 12 April 1964 a plaque in honour of Gen. Walerian Czuma was unveiled. Other plaques commemorate the many Polish Army regiments which took part in the defence of Poland in several wars. They include:

- 14th Jazlowiec Uhlan Regiment (to Bdr. Gen. Konstanty Plisowski and Col. Edward Godlewski),
- 10 Pułk Strzelców Konnych (II RP) (10th Mounted Rifles Regiment)
- 1st Krechowce Uhlan Regiment
- 68 Pułk Piechoty (II RP) (68th Infantry Regiment)
- 69 Pułk Piechoty (II RP) (69th Infantry Regiment)
- 70 Pułk Piechoty (II RP) (70th Infantry Regiment)
- 17th Infantry Division (Poland)
- 17 Pułk Artylerii Lekkiej (17th Light Artillery Regiment)
- 22 Pułk Piechoty (II RP) (22nd Infantry Regiment)
- 29 Pułk Strzelców Kaniowskich (29th Kaniów Rifle Regiment)
- 1st Grenadier Division (Poland)
- 2nd Rifle Division (Poland)
- 16 Lwowski Batalion Strzelców (16th Lwów Rifle Battalion)
- 7 Pułk Artylerii Przeciwpancernej (7th Anti-Tank Artillery Regiment)
- 8 Batalion Strzelców Brabanckich (8th Battalion of Brabant Rifles)
- 9 Batalion Strzelców Flandryjskich (9th Battalion of Flanders Rifles)
- 5th Kresowa Infantry Division
- Pułk Ułanów Karpackich (Carpathian Uhlan Regiment)

On the ceremonial founding anniversary of the Polish Corps of Cadets, on 29 May 1983, memorials to their battalions were unveiled: Cadet Corps Numbers 1, 2 and 3.

On 23 April 1978 soil from the site of the Katyn massacre in Soviet-Russia was brought to the church and secreted inside its wall in commemoration of the 28,000 Polish Army Reserve officers of all faiths and members of the professions, who were murdered in 1940 on the orders of Stalin. The symbolic act was enabled through the offices of Cavalry officer, captain Zygmunt Godyń.

== Columbarium ==
In the small garden of remembrance surrounding the church building is a columbarium, where the ashes of over 1300 deceased are kept. The initiative for a "crypt", to the left of the main entrance came from Maria Leśniak.

== Commemorative Gallery ==
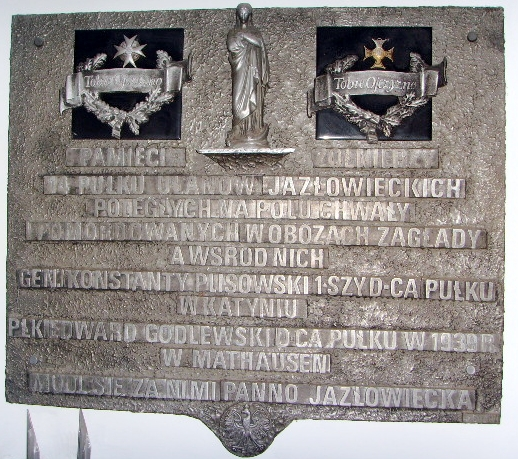
Memorial of the 14th Jazlowiec Uhlan Regiment

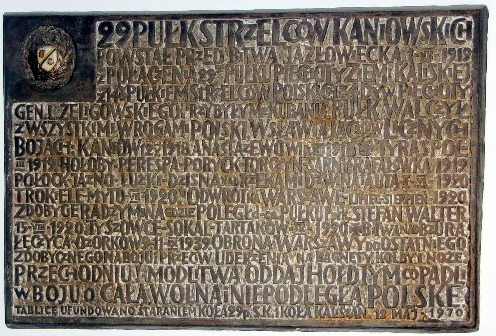
Plaque to the 29th Kaniów Rifle Division

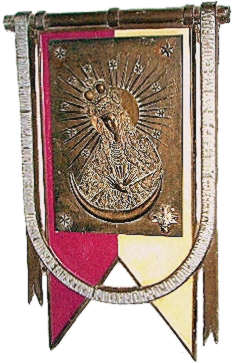
Our Lady of the Gate of Dawn banner tablet of the 1st Krechowce Uhlan Regiment

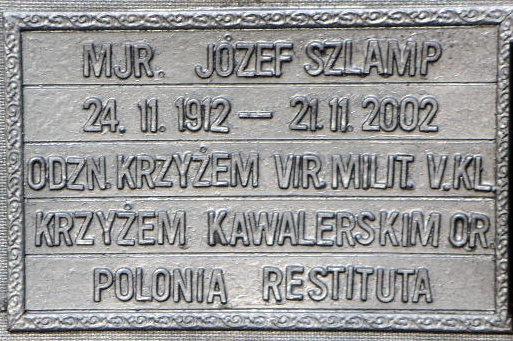
Plaque in memory of maj. Józef Szlamp

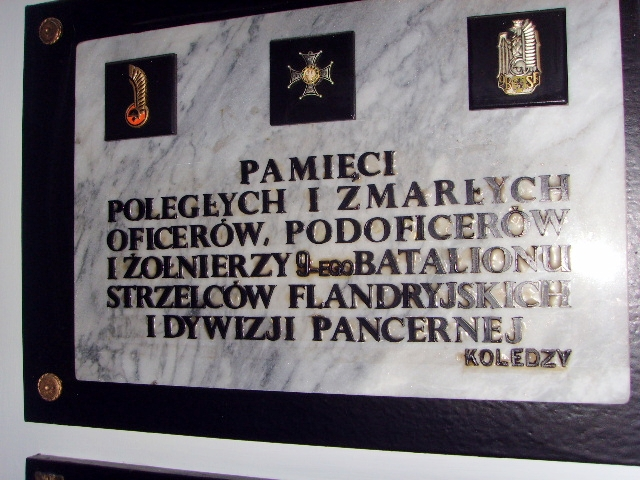
Memorial to the 9th Battalion of the Flanders Rifles

== See also ==
- Polish Resettlement Act 1947
- Brompton Cemetery
- Brompton Oratory
- Gunnersbury Cemetery
- Poles in the United Kingdom
- Polish Catholic Mission
- Polish Social and Cultural Centre
- Catholic Church in England and Wales
