= Polish Society of Arts and Sciences Abroad =

Polish society based in London

PTNO
- Polish Society of Arts and Sciences Abroad
- Polskie Towarzystwo Naukowe na Obczyźnie
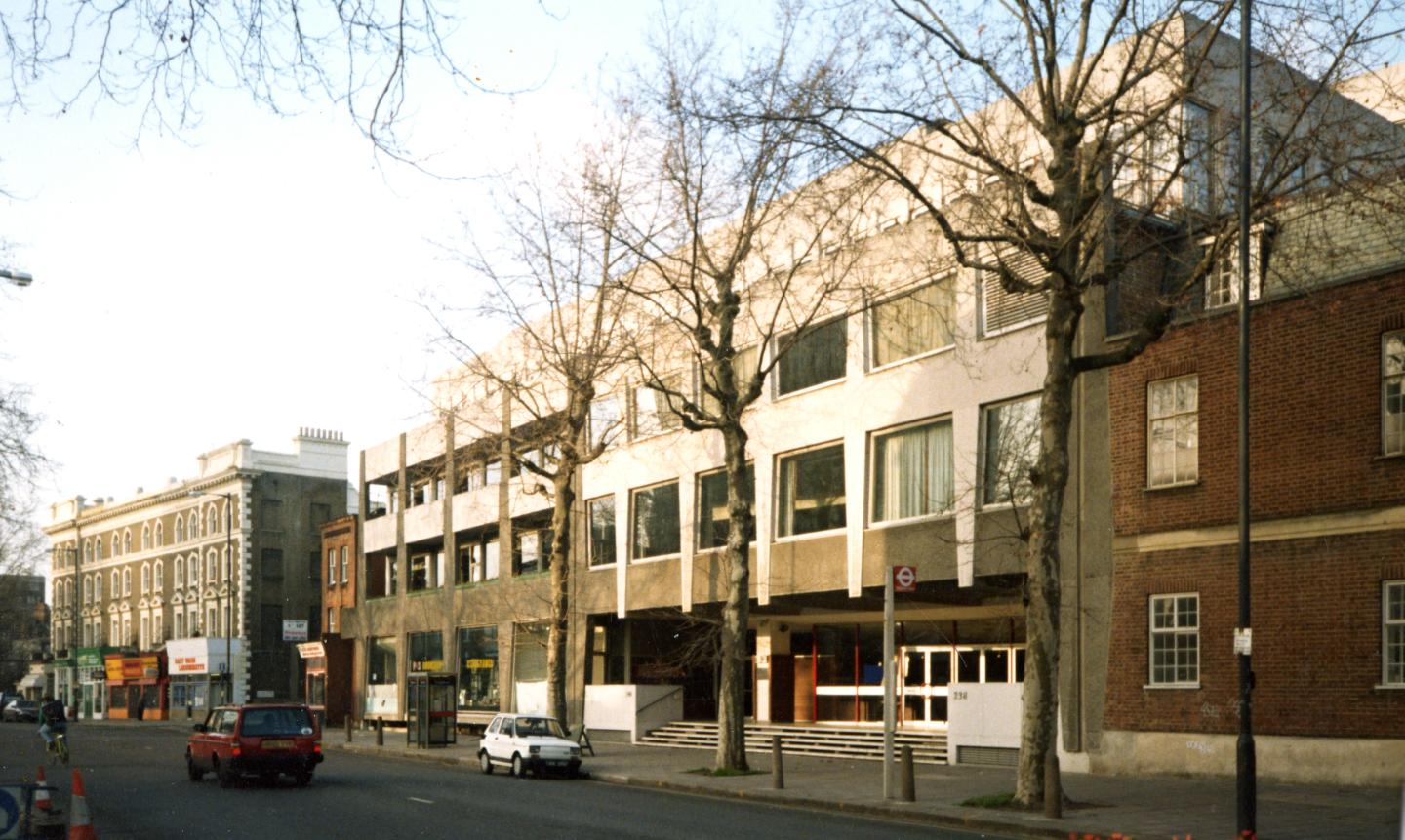
- Headquarters of the PTNO at the POSK building
- Abbreviation: PTNO
- Established: 1948
- Headquarters: King Street
- Location: London
- Coordinates: 51°29′36″N 0°14′15″W
- Region served: Polonia
- Official language: Polish
- President: Andrzej Suchcitz
- Website: ptno.org

Polish Society of Arts and Sciences Abroad (Polish: Polskie Towarzystwo Naukowe na Obczyźnie, PTNO) is a Polish learned society located in London in the Polish Social and Cultural Association building. It was established in 1948 and its aim is to represent and support members of Polish academia who live and work abroad.

== Presidents ==
- Tadeusz Brzeski (1950–1958)
- Tadeusz Sulimirski (1958–1959)
- Władysław Folkierski (1959–1961)
- Bronisław Hełczyński (1961–1965)
- Jakub Rostowski (1965–1966)
- Bronisław Hełczyński (1966–1978)
- Tadeusz Sulimirski (1978–1980)
- Tymon Terlecki (1980–1981)
- Edward Szczepanik (1981–2003)
- Stanisław Portalski (2003–2011)
- Bolesław Indyk (2011–2015)
- Andrzej Fórmaniak (2015–2019)
- Andrzej Suchcitz (2019–present)
