= Polska Fundacja Kulturalna =

United Kingdom publisher in Polish

Polska Fundacja Kulturalna (PFK), is an expatriate Polish publishing house, founded in London in 1950 to help maintain Polish culture among Poles who had been resettled in the UK after WWII. It is based at the Polish Social and Cultural Centre, known as POSK in King Street, Hammersmith, London. It is housed there along with a number of other organisations which serve Polish expatriates and others interested in Polish culture.

The initiative for the project came from the writer, Juliusz Sakowski. It is a Registered Charity (no. 277603) and a company limited by guarantee.

Not until 1963 did the first books and pamphlets begin to appear under the imprint of PFK. Since then well over 500 titles have been published. From 1968 it has been the publisher of Dziennik Polski i Dziennik Żołnierza, The Polish Daily newspaper, now a weekly, and the oldest Polish language journal in print for the Polish diaspora in the UK.

In 2003 on its 40th anniversary, the foundation published the book, Polska Fundacja Kulturalna. 40-lecie działalności wydawniczej 1963-2003 edited by Marek Jastrzębski, outlining its four decades of publishing activity.
