= Ravenscourt Baptist Church =

Church in Hammersmith, London

Coordinates: 51.4940°N 0.2371°W

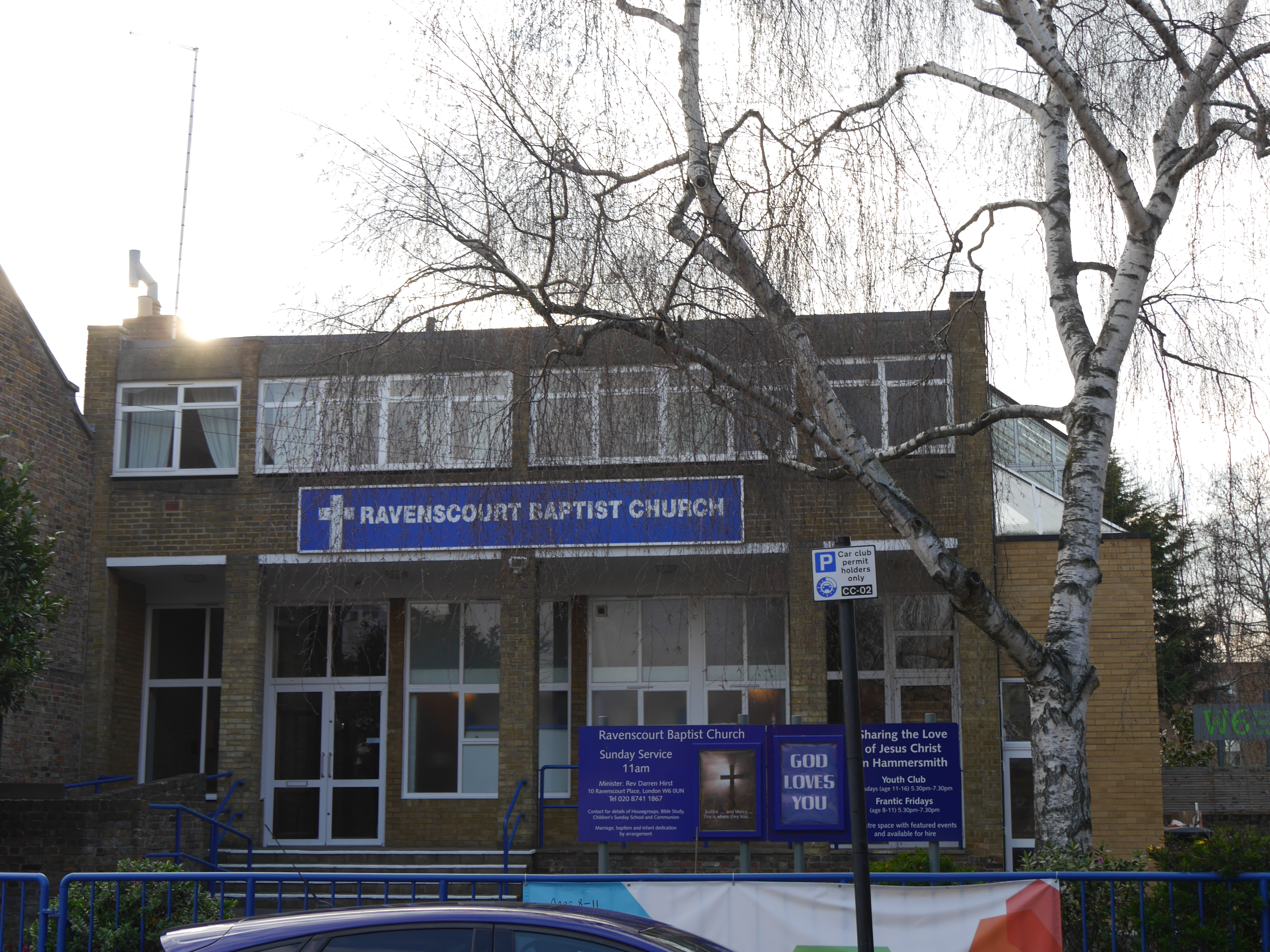
- Ravenscourt Baptist Church
- Denomination: Baptist
- Website: ravenscourtbaptist.com

History
- Former name: West End Baptist Church
- Founded: 1793

Architecture
- Groundbreaking: 1971
- Completed: 1972
- Construction cost: £78,000

Ravenscourt Baptist Church is a church in Ravenscourt Road, Hammersmith, London. It was established in 1793 as the West End Baptist Church. The current building opposite the Ravenscourt Park tube station opened in 1971.

== History ==
A society of Baptists first started meeting on Hampshire Hog Lane in Hammersmith as early as 1768. The exact location of the meeting house is unknown. In 1788, a new meeting house built by Samuel Naylor was opened on King Street. For two years, it was occupied by Baptists, after which it was let to another religious society, possibly Methodists, who called the building Trinity Chapel.

By November 1793, the building was again taken over by Baptists, forming what became known for over 200 years as the West End Baptist Church. In 1808, the church started a Sunday school for boys, which was opened to girls in 1839.

A larger church building was built in 1851. The West End Baptist Church on King Street was famously depicted in a painting by A. J. Messenger at the Royal Academy of Arts, described as "indicative of the heaviness of the Victorian style of buildings".

Further modifications were made to the building in 1902. By 1909, it had 630 members.

By the 1960s, the church found it difficult to maintain the premises. On 12 June 1971, four foundation stones, including three taken from the old premises, were laid for a new church building on Ravenscourt Road. Church documents dating back to the 19th century, sealed in glass jars, became part of the new structure. The minister at the time was the Reverend Frederick Hemmens.

Later that year, excavators were tasked with digging up graves dating back to 1793 in the old church cemetery, after a special bill was passed in Parliament authorising development of the land, and Royal assent was granted in December 1970. The cemetery had been used to bury dissenters who were not allowed to be buried on the "consecrated ground" of the Anglican Church. As of 18 November 1971, eight skeletons had been unearthed; they were thought to be approximately 150 years old.

The current church and hall block opened in 1972, with a new entrance on Ravenscourt Road. The new church, which cost £78,000 to build, had a chapel seating 240 people, a large hall, two small halls, and a caretaker's two-bedroomed flat. The front hall block on King Street became part of the Polish Social and Cultural Centre.

In subsequent decades, church membership declined. By 1993, it had only 40 members.
