= Wiesław Lechowicz =

Polish Roman Catholic bishop

- Bishop of the Military Ordinariate of Poland
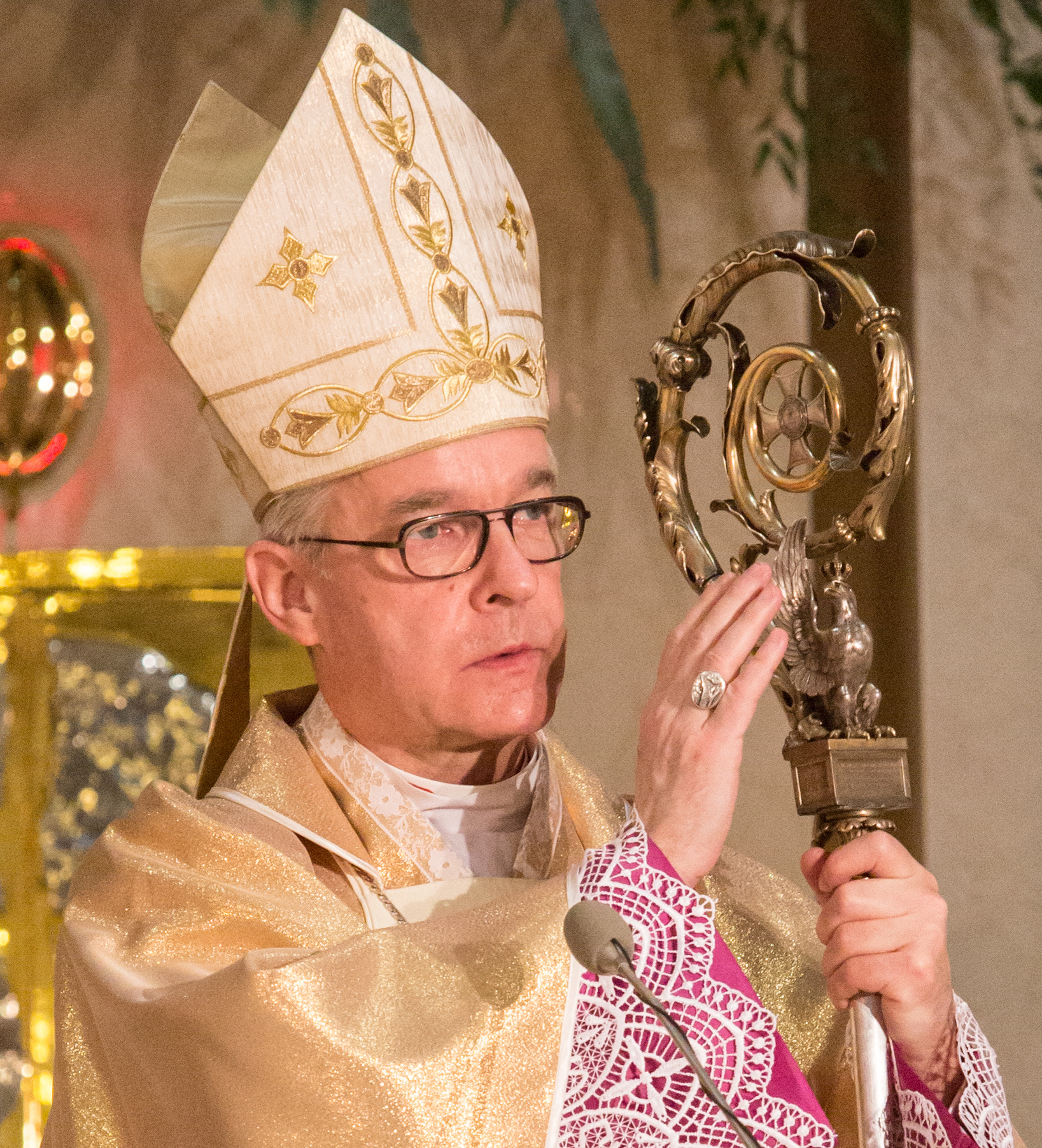
- Appointed: 15 January 2022
- Predecessor: Józef Guzdek
- Previous posts: Auxiliary bishop of Tarnów (2007 – 2022); Titular bishop of Lambiridi (2007 – 2022)

Orders
- Ordination: 24 May 1987 by Jerzy Ablewicz
- Consecration: 16 February 2008 by Wiktor Skworc

Personal details
- Born: 22 December 1962 (age 63) Dąbrowa Tarnowska
- Education: Pontifical University of the Holy Cross; Pontifical University of John Paul II
- Motto: In finem diligere
- Coat of arms

Wiesław Lechowicz (born 22 December 1962) is the incumbent Roman Catholic bishop of the Military Ordinariate of Poland.

== Biography ==
Lechowicz was born in Dąbrowa Tarnowska to Bolesław and Władysława Lechowicz (née Piętak). After finishing schooling in Żabno and Tarnów, he began attending the diocesan seminary in Tarnów. He graduated with a magister's degree in biblical theology and was ordained a priest on 24 May 1987 by Jerzy Ablewicz, bishop of Tarnów. In 1992, he began to study pastoral theology at the Pontifical University of the Holy Cross; he obtained a licentiate in 1994 and a doctorate in 1996. Upon returning, he was made a pastor for a parish in Bochnia and later Nowy Sącz.

In 1999, Lechowicz was made prefect of the diocesan seminary of Tarnów. During this period, he studied canon law at the Pontifical University of John Paul II; he graduated with a licentiate in 2002. He was appointed rector of the diocesan seminary of Tarnów in 2004 and was appointed chaplain of His Holiness on 10 March 2005. On 22 December 2007, Lechowicz was appointed by Pope Francis as auxiliary bishop of Tarnów and titular bishop of Lambiridi; he was consecrated on 16 February 2008 by Wiktor Skworc, with assistance from Józef Kowalczyk and Stanisław Dziwisz.

On 15 January 2022, he was appointed by Francis as bishop of the Military Ordinariate of Poland. He was installed on 12 February.
