= Stanisław Gall =

Polish Roman Catholic bishop

- Apostolic administrator of Warsaw
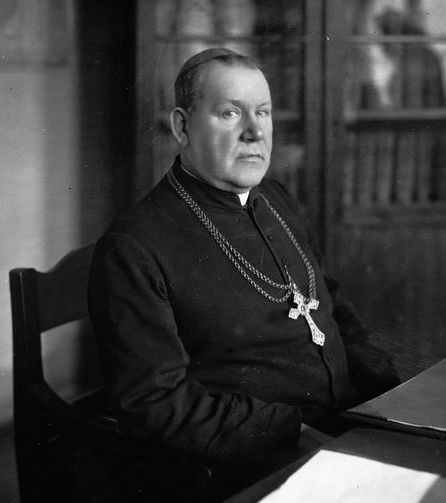
- Appointed: 6 January 1940
- Previous post(s): Titular archbishop of Carpathos (1933–1942); Bishop of the Military Ordinariate of Poland (1918–1932); Auxiliary bishop of Warsaw (1918–1919); Titular bishop of Halicarnassus (1918–1919)

Orders
- Ordination: 29 June 1887 by Kazimierz Ruszkiewicz
- Consecration: 17 November 1918 by Aleksander Kakowski

Personal details
- Born: 21 April 1865; Warsaw
- Died: 11 September 1942 (aged 77); Warsaw

Stanisław Tomasz Gall (21 April 1865 – 11 September 1942) was a Polish Roman Catholic bishop.

== Biography ==
Gall was born in Warsaw; he began attending the diocesan seminary in Warsaw in 1880. He was later sent by Wincenty Teofil Popiel to the Pontifical Gregorian University in 1883 under a pseudonym, where he studied philosophy, theology and canon law. He obtained a doctorate in philosophy from the university in 1887. After returning to Poland, he was ordained a priest on 29 June 1887 by Kazimierz Ruszkiewicz.

In 1889, Gall was appointed by Popiel as a professor of liturgy and philosophy at the diocesan seminary of Warsaw; in 1890, he was made vice-regent of the seminary. He was made vice-rector of the Saint Petersburg Roman Catholic Theological Academy in 1910. He was appointed auxiliary bishop of Warsaw and titular bishop of Halicarnassus by Benedict XV in 1918; he was consecrated in St. John's Archcathedral by Aleksander Kakowski, with assistance from Kazimierz Ruszkiewicz and Wojciech Owczarek. He was later made vicar general of the Archdiocese of Warsaw by Kakowski.

On 5 February 1919, Gall was appointed Bishop of the Military Ordinariate of Poland by Benedict XV, upon request from Józef Piłsudski; because of this, he was made a lieutenant general. He served in this position until 12 March 1933, when he resigned from the diocese due to a long-standing conflict that he had with Piłsudski. On 16 February 1933, Gall was appointed titular archbishop of Karpathos by Pius IX.

After the death of Aleksander Kakowski, Gall was appointed vicar capitular of the Archdiocese of Warsaw on 5 January 1939; on 6 January 1940, he was appointed apostolic administrator of the Archdiocese by Pius XII. During the German occupation, he provided the Vatican with information about what was occurring. He died on 11 September 1942 in Warsaw and was buried at a cemetery in Warsaw; his remains were transferred to the Field Cathedral of the Polish Army in 2018.
