= Military Ordinariate of Poland =

Roman Catholic diocese in Poland

Coordinates: 52°14′29″N 21°00′54″E

Military Ordinariate of Poland Ordinariatus Militaris Poloniae Ordynariat Polowy Wojska Polskiego

Catholic
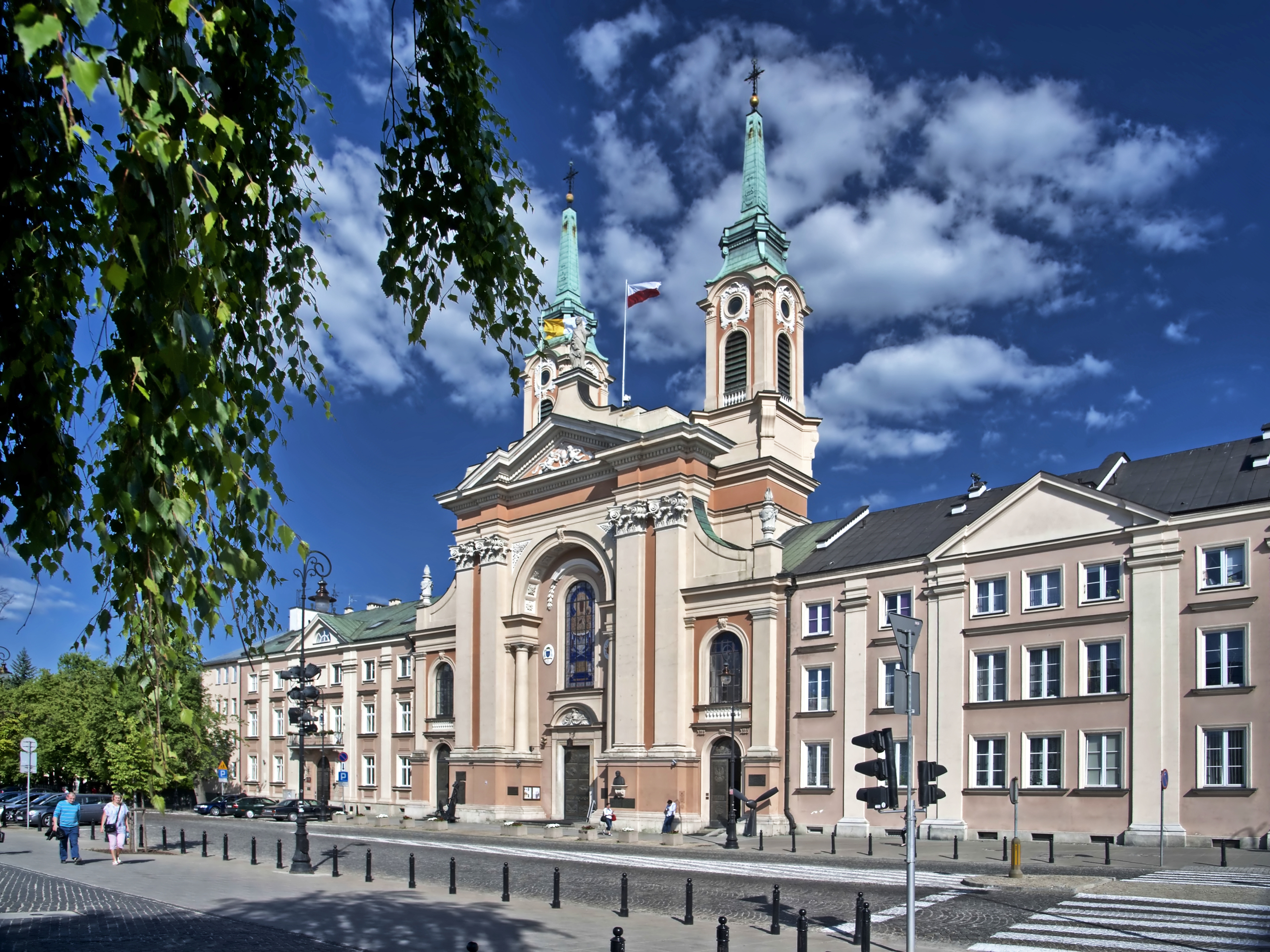
- Church of Our Lady Queen of the Polish Crown

Location
- Country: Poland

Information
- Denomination: Roman Catholic
- Rite: Latin Rite
- Established: 5 February 1919 (107 years ago)

Current leadership
- Pope: Leo XIV
- Bishop: Wiesław Lechowicz

The Military Ordinariate of Poland (Polish: Ordynariat Polowy Wojska Polskiego) is a military ordinariate of the Roman Catholic Church. Immediately subject to the Holy See, it provides pastoral care to Roman Catholics serving in the Polish Armed Forces and their families.

== History ==
It was first established as a military vicariate on 5 February 1919, but was suspended in 1947. Following the fall of communist rule in 1989, a military ordinariate was established and the first military ordinary was appointed on 21 January 1991. The Episcopal seat is located at the Field Cathedral of the Polish Army (Katedra Polowa Wojska Polskiego) in Warsaw, Poland.

== Office holders ==
=== Military Vicariate ===
- Stanisław Gall (appointed 5 February 1919 – resigned December 1931)
- Józef Gawlina (appointed 15 February 1933 – resigned 1947)

=== Military Ordinariate ===
- Sławoj Leszek Głódź (appointed 21 January 1991 – translated to the Diocese of Warszawa-Praga 26 August 2004)
  - given the personal title of archbishop on 17 July 2002
- Tadeusz Płoski (appointed 16 October 2004 – killed in a plane crash 10 April 2010)
- Józef Guzdek (appointed 6 December 2010 – 16 July 2021); formerly an Auxiliary Bishop of the Archdiocese of Krakow
- Wiesław Lechowicz (15 January 2022 – present)
