= Tydzień Polski =

United Kingdom weekly paper published in Polish

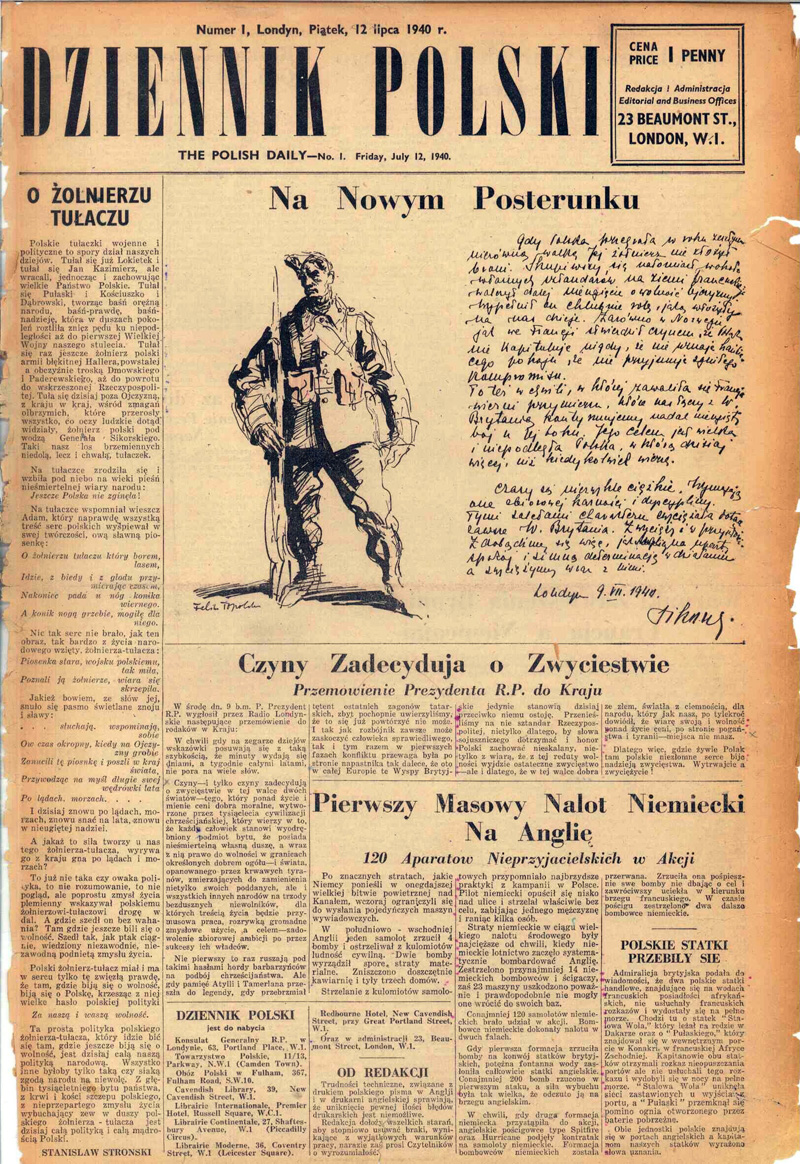
- An early front page of Dziennik Polski
- Type: Weekly newspaper
- Format: Tabloid
- Owner: Polska Fundacja Kulturalna
- Editor: Jarosław Koźmiński
- Founded: 1940
- Relaunched: 2015
- Language: Polish
- Headquarters: 238-246 King Street, Hammersmith; London; W6 0RF
- Circulation: ca. 10,000
- Website: tydzien.co.uk

Tydzień Polski (transl. The Polish Week) is the successor title to the Dziennik Polski i Dziennik Żołnierza (transl. The Polish Daily and Soldier's Daily), which was the first Polish language Daily newspaper continuously published in the United Kingdom from 12 July 1940 to July 2015. On 17 July 2015, it became a weekly publication, and renamed to Tydzień Polski.

Publication began within three weeks of the arrival in London of the Polish government-in-exile and the paper was considered the official organ of the legal Polish authorities, recognised by HM Government and the Allies of World War II. From 1959, in addition to the Monday to Friday issues, a weekend edition came out on Saturdays, under the title, Tydzień Polski, The Polish Week. The editorial offices were for many years in Charleville Road in London's West Kensington.

== History ==
Between 1940 and December 1943 the paper appeared as Dziennik Polski (transl. The Polish Daily). On 1 January 1944 it merged with Dziennik Żołnierza (transl. The Soldier's Daily) which had been the house journal of the I Polish Corps published in Glasgow between 1940 and 1943. Until 1945 the combined title, Dziennik Polski i Dziennik Żołnierza, became the mouthpiece of the Polish government in exile. It published news of events as the war unfolded, ministerial communiqués and publicised tragic discoveries such as the Katyn massacre, the death of General Sikorski or the Tehran Conference preparatory to the Yalta Conference. There were reports from Occupied Poland and other theatres of war. It also carried information aimed at assisting the daily life of a population that had not yet sufficiently mastered English.

Although the now shadow Polish government remained in London until a Polish government was freely elected in Poland in 1990, it had ensured the paper's future by a one-off financial settlement under a board of independent trustees which continued until 1968. From then the exiled Polska Fundacja Kulturalna in London became its publisher.

=== Post-war ===
In the immediate aftermath of World War II, two seismic events affected the paper. The first was the transfer of British government recognition to the Communist authorities in Warsaw which had immediate financial repercussions. The second was the arrival in Great Britain of over 150,000 Polish allied troops and thousands of displaced persons emerging from camps in Western Europe. The Polish Resettlement Act 1947 did however grant permanent settlement rights to the Polish population which came mainly from the Kresy region of Poland and whose right of return to their homeland was permanently barred under the Yalta provisions. Accordingly, one third of Poland's territory had been ceded to the Soviet Union, including the two most important Polish centres of culture outside Warsaw and Kraków, that were the cities of Lwow and Wilno. It was as a consequence of this, that historically many original contributors to the paper were Kresovians, as were their readers.

As Poles in the United Kingdom became increasingly assimilated and the older generation passed on, Polish cultural structures came under severe financial pressure. Dziennik Polski was no exception as it struggled with a dwindling circulation and falling advertising revenue so that combined with poor management in 2005 it came close to ceasing publication altogether. It was temporarily rescued by the appointment of new trustees and a generous donation from the Polish Combatants' Association. It was also somewhat aided by the influx of a new wave of Polish migrants. However, its format and competition from newer media meant a radical reorientation became inevitable.

== Current weekly publication ==
With profound demographic changes in the readership over seven decades, and the appearance of free Polish language print publications after 2004 and offers online, the paper's strategy has had to adapt. The content includes British and Polish and world news, comments, readers' letters, features and obituaries as well as advertising of services pertinent to Polish migrants and older residents in a tabloid newspaper. The forty page edition comes out on Fridays. The paper has subscribers and is also sold through 2,500 outlets across the British Isles. It has an estimated readership of 30,000.

== See also ==
- Poles in the United Kingdom
