= Holy Family of Nazareth Convent School =

Former girls school

Coordinates: 52.3026°N 0.8908°W

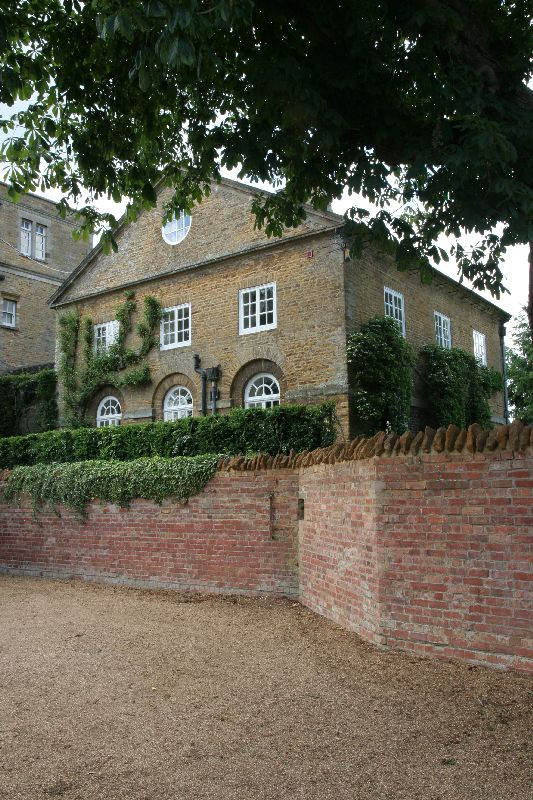
- The Dower House, Pitsford School
- Pitsford, Northamptonshire; United Kingdom

Information
- Religious affiliation: Catholic Church
- Established: 1947
- Founders: C.S.F.N.
- Closed: 1984

The Holy Family of Nazareth Convent School was a girls school in Pitsford Hall in the village of Pitsford, Northamptonshire, England. The convent school was run by the Sisters of the Holy Family of Nazareth (The Holy Family Convent School), and existed from 1947–1984.

It was started after the Second World War as a Polish girls school for children of emigrants. The order of religious who took on the project was founded by Franciszka Siedliska who had opened the first Polish school in London in the 1890s. The 'Pitsford' school provided education at elementary and secondary levels, finishing with the GCE – A-level exam (the equivalent of the Polish matura certificate).

In the 1970s and 1980s the school gained a multiethnic character; in the 1980s about 50% of its schoolgirls were of Polish origin, while the rest were native British. By 1984 about 1,500 girls had graduated from the school. After its closure it later reopened in 1989 as the Northamptonshire Grammar School (later the Pitsford School).

== See also ==
- Divine Mercy College
- Polish Catholic Mission
- Poles in the United Kingdom
