= Józef Guzdek =

Polish Roman Catholic bishop

- Archbishop of Białystok
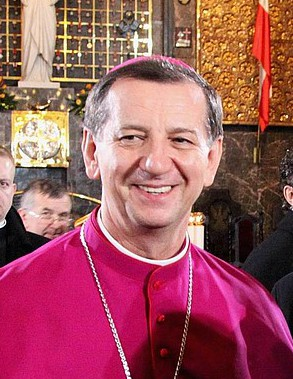
- Guzdek in 2010
- Appointed: 16 July 2021
- Predecessor: Tadeusz Wojda
- Previous posts: Bishop of the Military Ordinariate of Poland (2010 – 2021); Auxiliary bishop of Kraków (2004 – 2010); Titular bishop of Treba (2004 – 2010)

Orders
- Ordination: 17 May 1981 by Franciszek Macharski
- Consecration: 15 September 2004 by Franciszek Macharski

Personal details
- Born: 18 March 1956 (age 70) Wadowice
- Education: Pontifical University of John Paul II
- Motto: In Te Domine speravi
- Coat of arms

Józef Guzdek (born 18 March 1956) is the incumbent archbishop of the Archdiocese of Białystok.

== Biography ==
Guzdek was born in Wadowice. He began to study at the metropolitan seminary of the Archdiocese of Kraków in 1975 after completing his high school exams. He was ordained on 17 May 1981 in Wawel Cathedral by Franciszek Macharski. Afterwards, he worked as a priest at various churches, including the Church of St. Anne.

Between 1994 and 1998, Guzdek served as prefect for the seminary of the Archdiocese of Kraków. He received a doctorate in theology in April 1998 from the Pontifical University of John Paul II; his doctoral advisor was Edward Staniek. He served as the editor for Notificationes between 1998 and 2002.

On 14 August 2004, Guzdek was appointed by John Paul II as auxiliary bishop of Kraków and titular bishop of Treba; he was consecrated on 15 September at the Divine Mercy Sanctuary by Franciszek Macharski, assisted by Józef Kowalczyk and Stanisław Dziwisz. He was appointed bishop of the Military Ordinariate of Poland on 4 December 2010 by Benedict XVI; he was installed as bishop on 19 December.

On 16 July 2021, Guzdek was appointed Archbishop of Białystok. He was installed on 4 September.
