= Strzybnik =

- Village
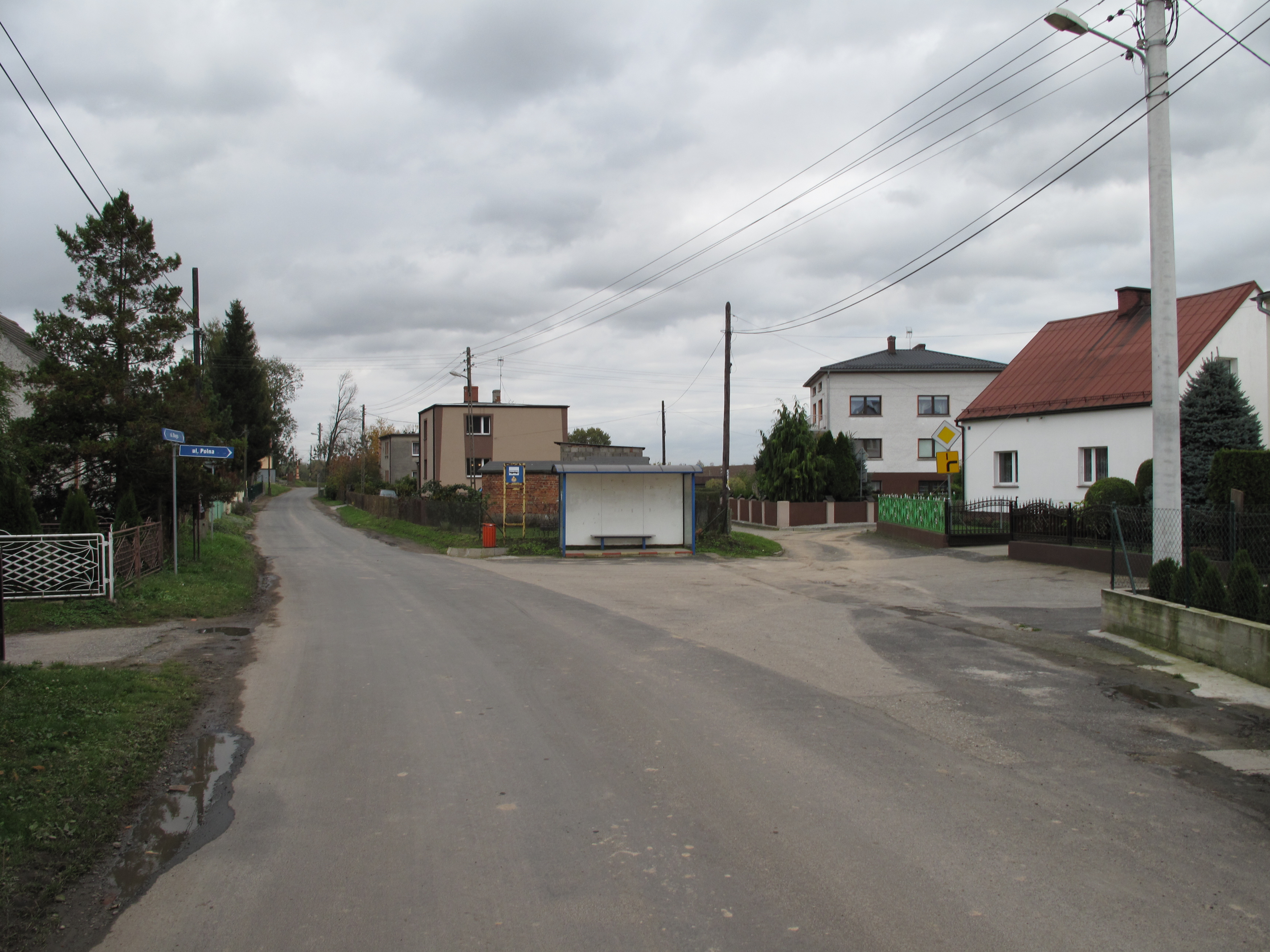
- Village square

- Location within Poland
- Coordinates: 50°8′10″N 18°9′46″E
- Country: Poland
- Voivodeship: Silesian
- County: Racibórz
- Gmina: Rudnik
- Population: 300

Strzybnik [ˈstʂɨbnik] is a village in the administrative district of Gmina Rudnik, within Racibórz County, Silesian Voivodeship, in southern Poland.

== Gallery ==
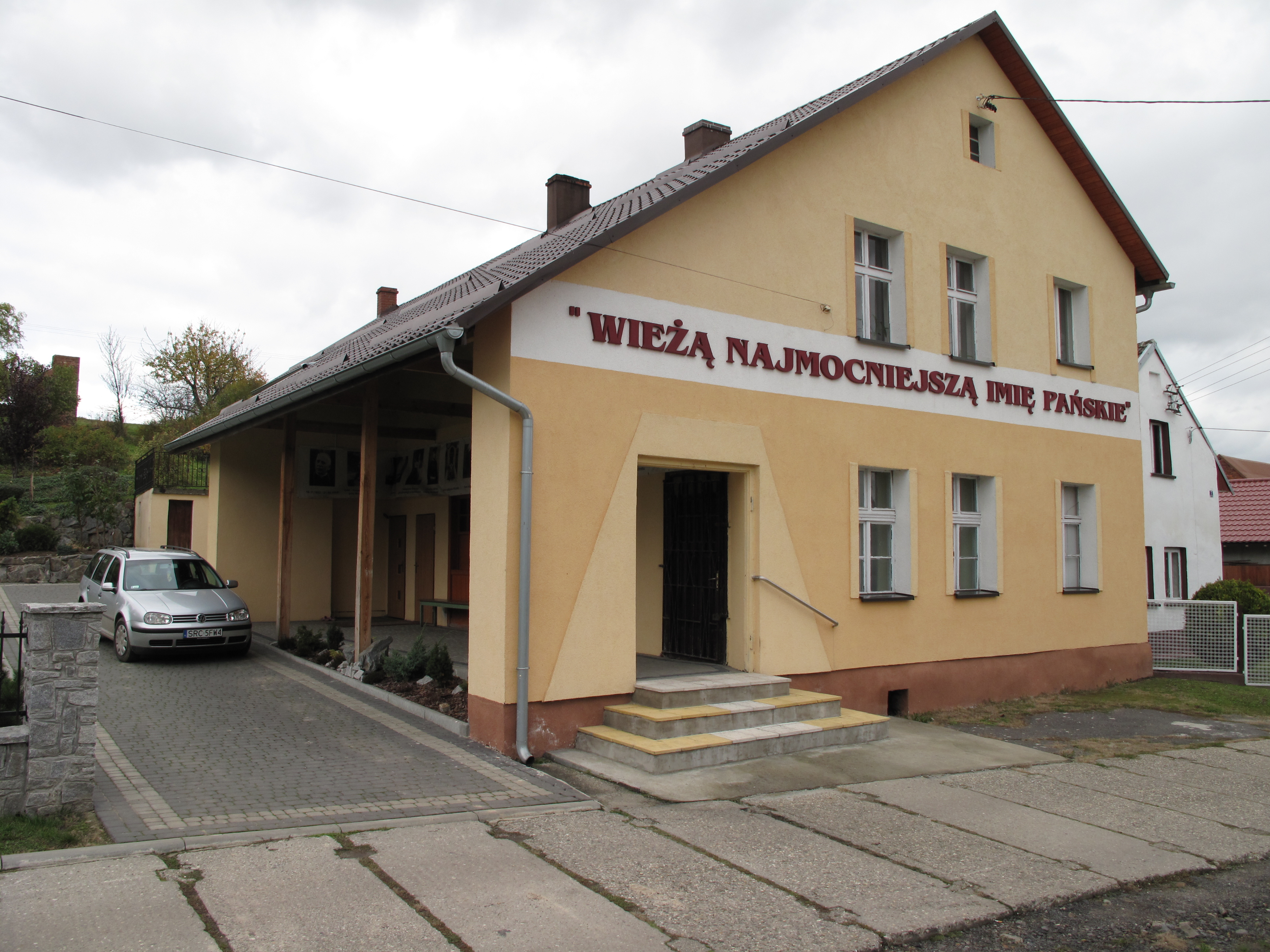

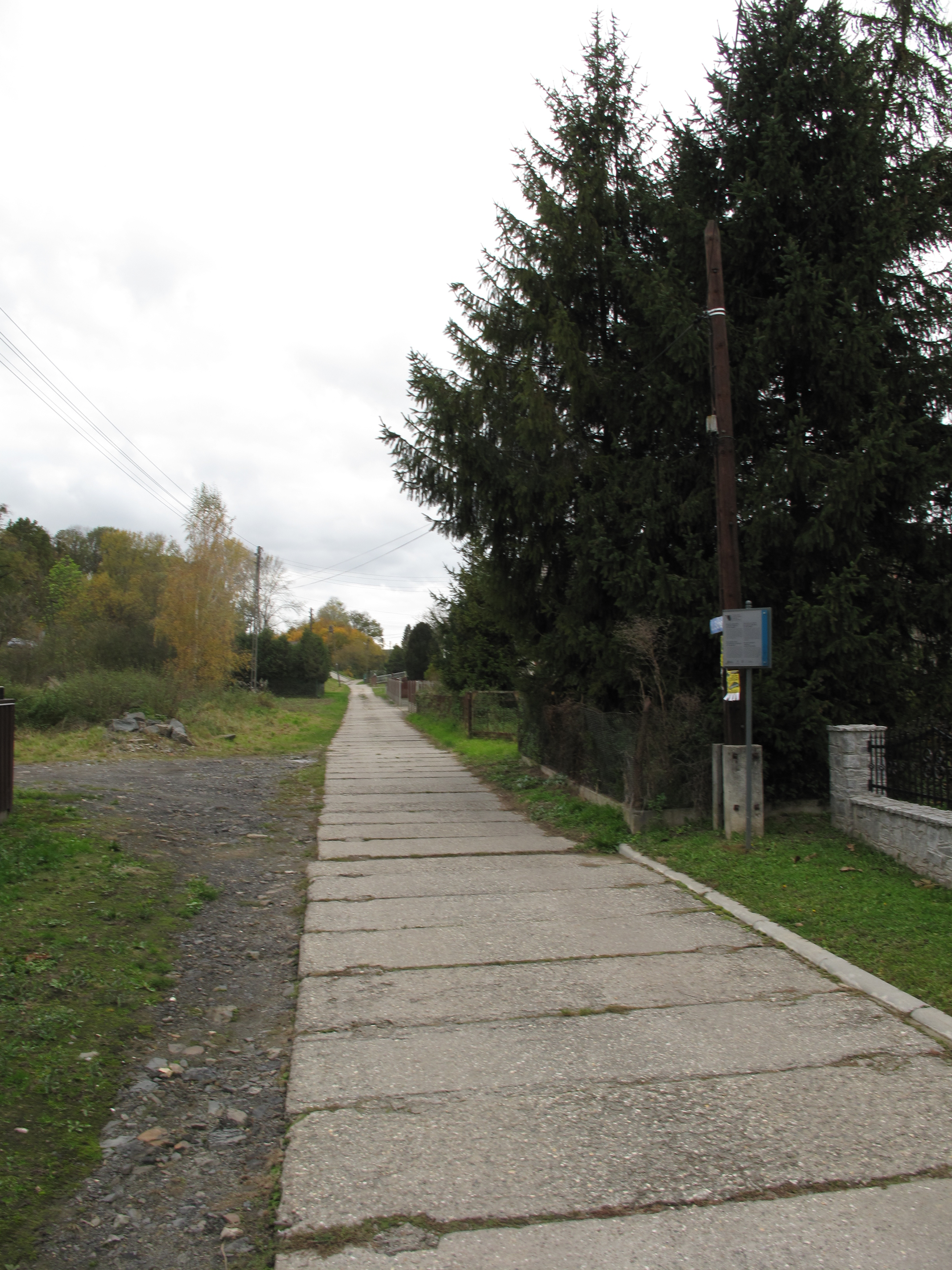
Road
