= Józef Gawlina =

Polish officer and archbishop (1882 – 1964)

- Titular archbishop of Madytus
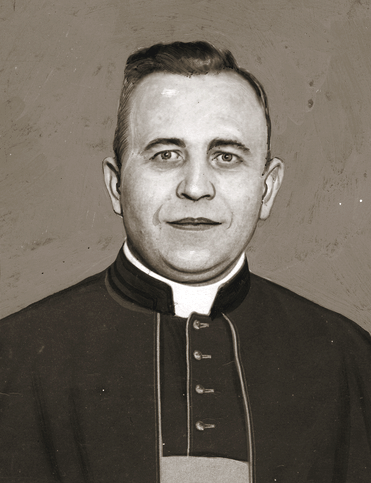
- Previous posts: Bishop of the Military Ordinariate of Poland (1933 – 1947); Titular bishop of Mariamme (1933–1947)

Orders
- Ordination: 19 June 1921 by Adolf Bertram
- Consecration: 19 March 1933 by August Hlond

Personal details
- Born: 17 November 1892 Strzybnik, Province of Silesia, Prussia, German Empire
- Died: 21 September 1964 (aged 71) Rome, Italy

Józef Feliks Gawlina (17 November 1882 – 21 September 1964) was a Roman Catholic bishop and divisional general in the Polish Armed Forces. He was an ordained priest, Doctor of Theology and, from 1933, bishop of the Military Ordinariate of Poland.

After the Second World War, Cardinal August Hlond gave him the brief to provide pastoral care to the Polish diaspora. In the words of Pope John Paul II, Gawlina was a "bishop-nomad".

In 1957 he was raised to the rank of archbishop. Following his death, the Secretary General of the Second Vatican Council described him as a "real pastor".

== Biography ==
=== Early life and episcopal career ===
Gawlina was born in Strzybnik to Franciszek and Joanna Gawlina (née Banas). He first received secondary education at a humanities-oriented gymnasium in Raciborz, transferring to a different gymnasium in Rybnik. After obtaining his matura, he enrolled at the University of Wrocław, where he studied theology. His studies were interrupted twice during World War 1; he was first drafted as a medic into the 11th Grenadier Regiment, with whom he was deployed to France in 1915, and later in 1917 was re-enlisted as part of the Sinai and Palestine campaign, during which he was captured in Damascus. After his release in 1919, he returned to Wrocław, obtaining a doctorate in 1921. He was ordained a priest on 19 March 1921 in Wrocław by Adolf Bertram.

Gawlina first served as a parish priest in Dębniki and Tychy. On 7 July 1924, he was appointed by August Hlond to serve as secretary-general for the Catholic League in the Apostolic Administration of Upper Silesia. In 1927, he was moved to Warsaw to found the Catholic News Agency (KAP), which served to counteract anti-Polish and anti-Catholic sentiment in the German press; it began operating from there on 1 April 1927. While directing the KAP, Gawlina underwent further education in journalism, and received a magister degree in moral theology from the University of Warsaw on 28 June 1928. Returning to the now-Diocese of Katowice in 1929, he was appointed as director of the Diocese's Catholic League, as a canon in the Diocese's cathedral chapter, and as the curator for the Polish province of the Sisters of Mary.

On 14 February 1933, Gawlina was appointed as bishop of the Military Ordinariate of Poland and titular bishop of Mariamme by Pope Pius XI; he was consecrated on 19 March 1933 in the Church of St. Barbara in Chorzów by August Hlond. He became a Knight of the Order of Malta on 28 November 1936.

=== Exile and titular archbishop of Madytus ===
Amidst the beginning of World War II, Gawlina left Poland for Romania, organizing pastoral care for interned Poles at Bucharest along the way. He then went to Rome, where his episcopal jurisdiction was extended to all Polish soldiers, both domestic and foreign, on 12 October 1939. He was later appointed a member of the National Council of Poland on 21 December of the same year. In his capacity as bishop of the Military Ordinariate, he undertook pastoral journeys in the Soviet Union and the United States. He was further appointed ordinary for Polish refugees in the Middle East and Far East in 1943; in this position, he founded seminaries in Beirut and Glasgow. He was also awarded the Order of Virtuti Militari, 5th class, for participating in the Battle of Monte Cassino, at the behest of Władysław Anders; his citation notes that he had visited forward aid stations and performed chaplain duties himself, even while under artillery fire. He also served as rector of Santo Stanislao dei Polacchi, beginning in November 1946.

Amidst August Hlond's arrest by the Germans in 1945, Gawlina was ordered to exercise spiritual care over Polish emigrants, and by extension as deputy protector of Polish emigrants; he then served as the ordinary bishop for Poles living in Germany and Austria. After the death of Cardinal Hlond in 1949, Gawlina was appointed "spiritual guardian of the Polish exiles" on 28 January. He helped to construct a "Polish Chapel" within Saint Peter's Basilica; he also established Catholic missions for Poles in at least a dozen countries.

On 29 November 1952, Gawlina was appointed titular archbishop of Madytus by Pope Pius XII. He died in 1962 in Rome, and was buried at the Monte Cassino Polish war cemetery.

== Bibliography ==
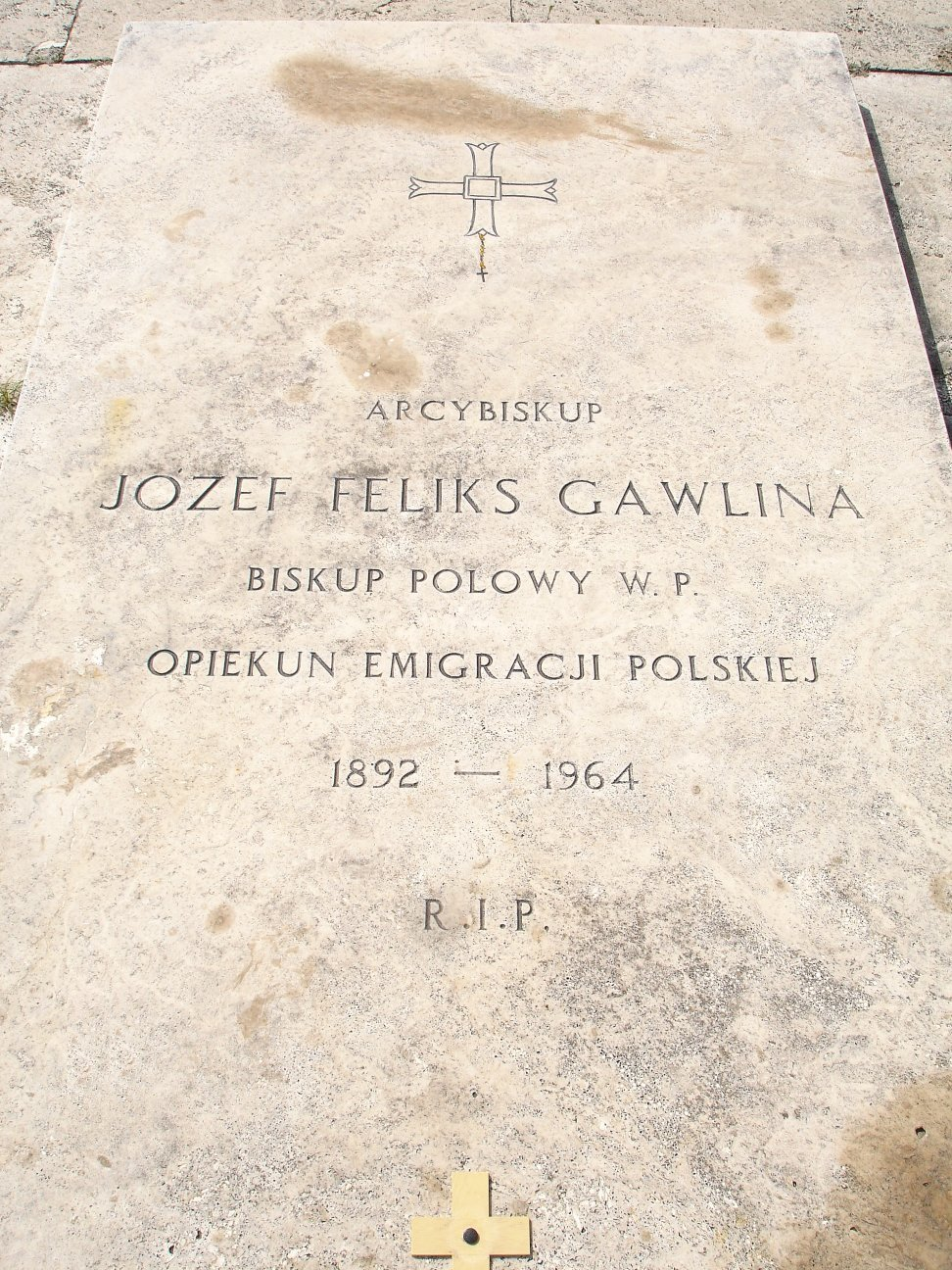
Archbishop Gawlina's tombstone in the Monte Cassino cemetery

- Bakalarz, Józef (1982). "Arcybiskup Józef Gawlina jako duchowy opiekun polonii". Studia Polonijne (in Polish). 5: 103–125.
- Władysław Bochnak, W służbie Bogu i ludziom. Sylwetki Ślązaków, Marki-Struga 1989, p. 200-211.
- Henryka Wolna-Van Das, Biskup polowy Józef Gawlina – w 100 lecie urodzin, Polska Zbrojna, November 1992
- Judycki, Zbigniew (2017). "Turris fortissima – nomen domini". Rocznik Biblioteki Kraków (in Polish). I: 131–141.
- T. Kryska Karski i S. Żurakowski, Generałowie Polski Niepodległej publ. Editions Spotkania Warszawa 1991
- Henryk P. Kosk, Generalicja polska, publ. Oficyna wydawnicza "Ajaks", Pruszków: 1998.
- A. K. Kunert, ed. (2002)."Józef Feliks Gawlina Biskup Polowy Polskich Sił Zbrojnych" in Emigracyjna Rzeczpospolita 1939-1990, vol. III. Warsaw.
- Szczepaniak, Maciej (2015). "Katolicka Agencja Prasowa – utworzenie i działalność pod kierunkiem księdza Józefa Gawliny". Polonia Sacra (in Polish). 19 (3): 177–19. doi:10.15633/ps.949.
- Bednarski, Damian (2019). Biskup Józef Gawlina jako opiekun polaków na emigracji (in Polish). ISBN 978-83-226-3657-2.

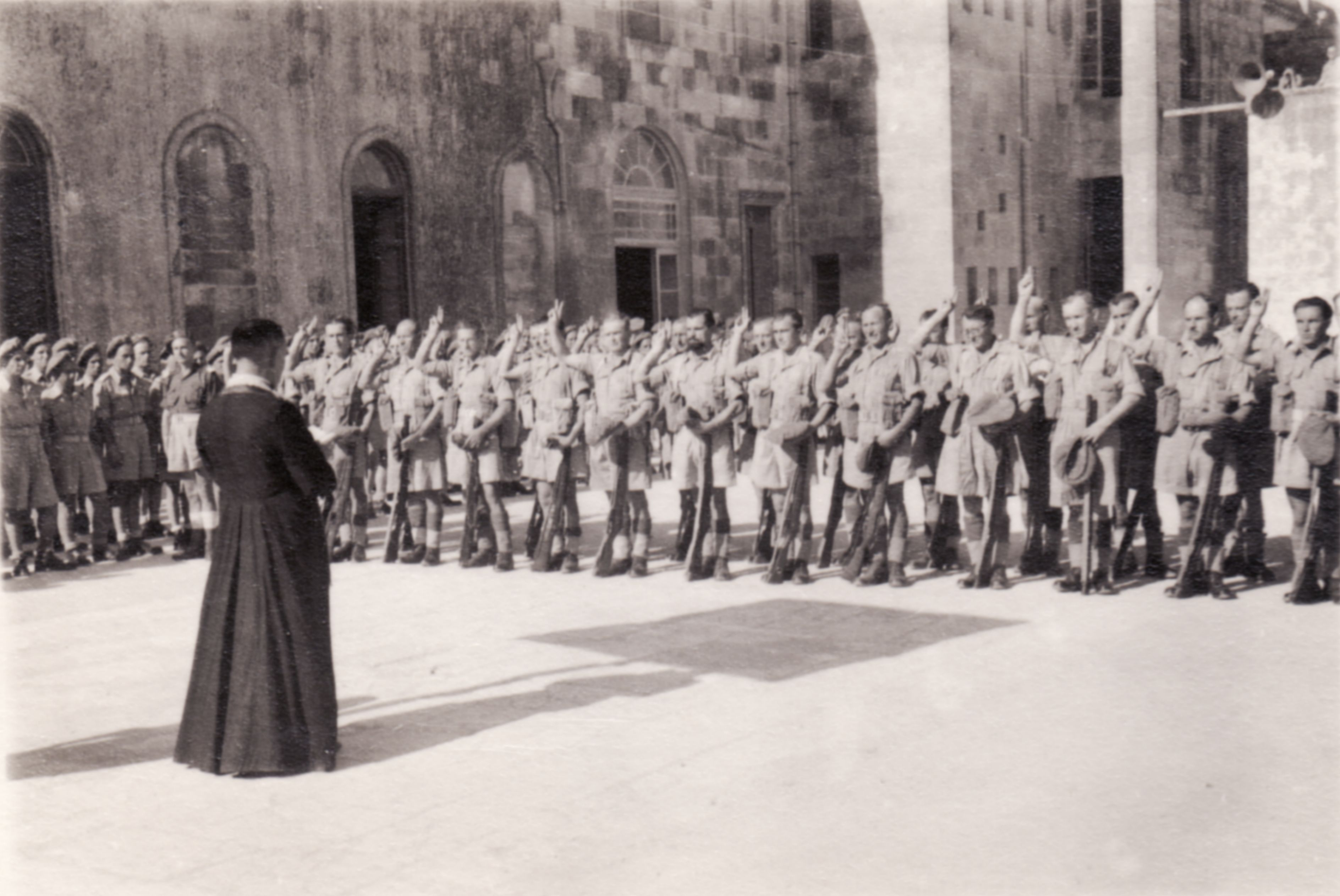
2nd Polish Corps with bishop Józef Gawlina in Casarano, 1946
