= Polish Catholic Mission =

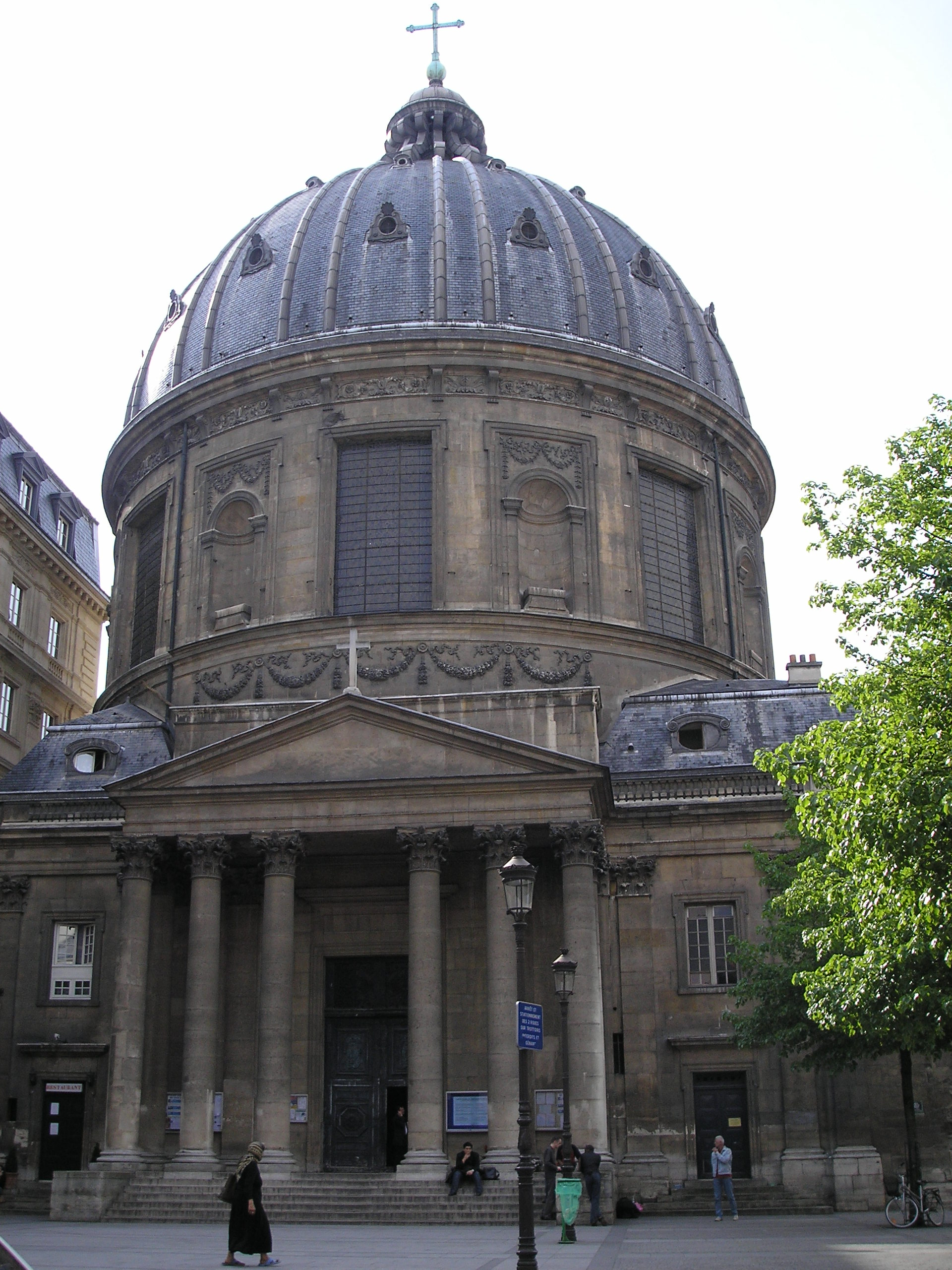
Polish church of Notre-Dame-de-l'Assomption, Paris.

The Polish Catholic Mission, Polish: Polska Misja Katolicka, (PMK) is a permanent Catholic chaplaincy for migrant Poles. It operates in a number of countries under the direction of the Polish Episcopal Conference.

== England and Wales ==
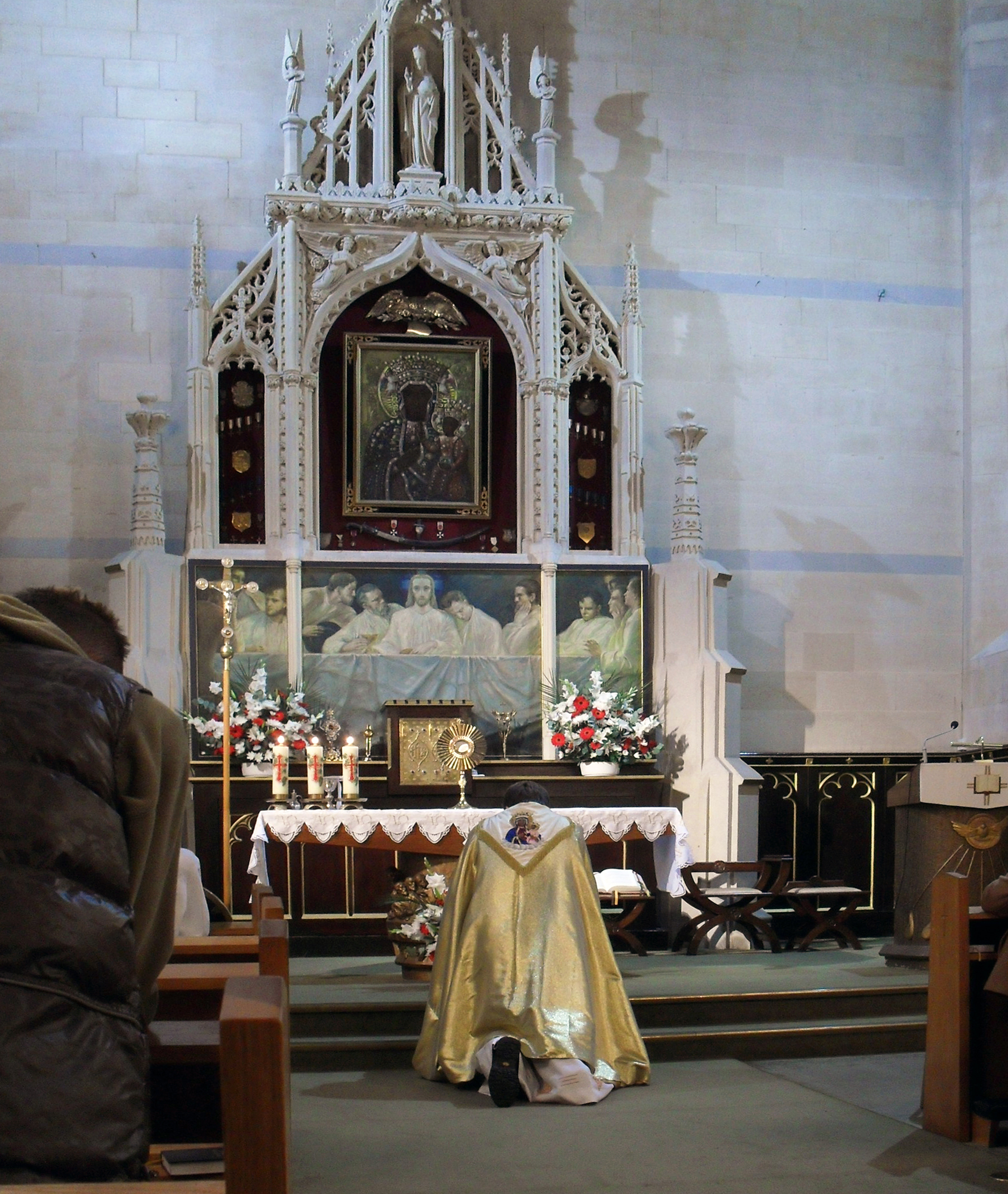
Church of Our Lady of Częstochowa, Devonia Road, Islington, London

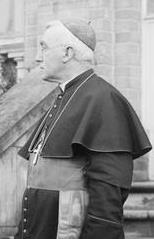
Cardinal Francis Bourne

=== History ===
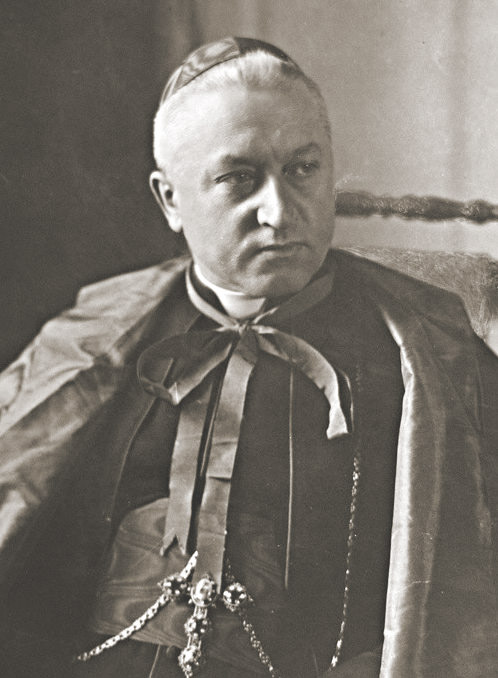
Cardinal Hlond

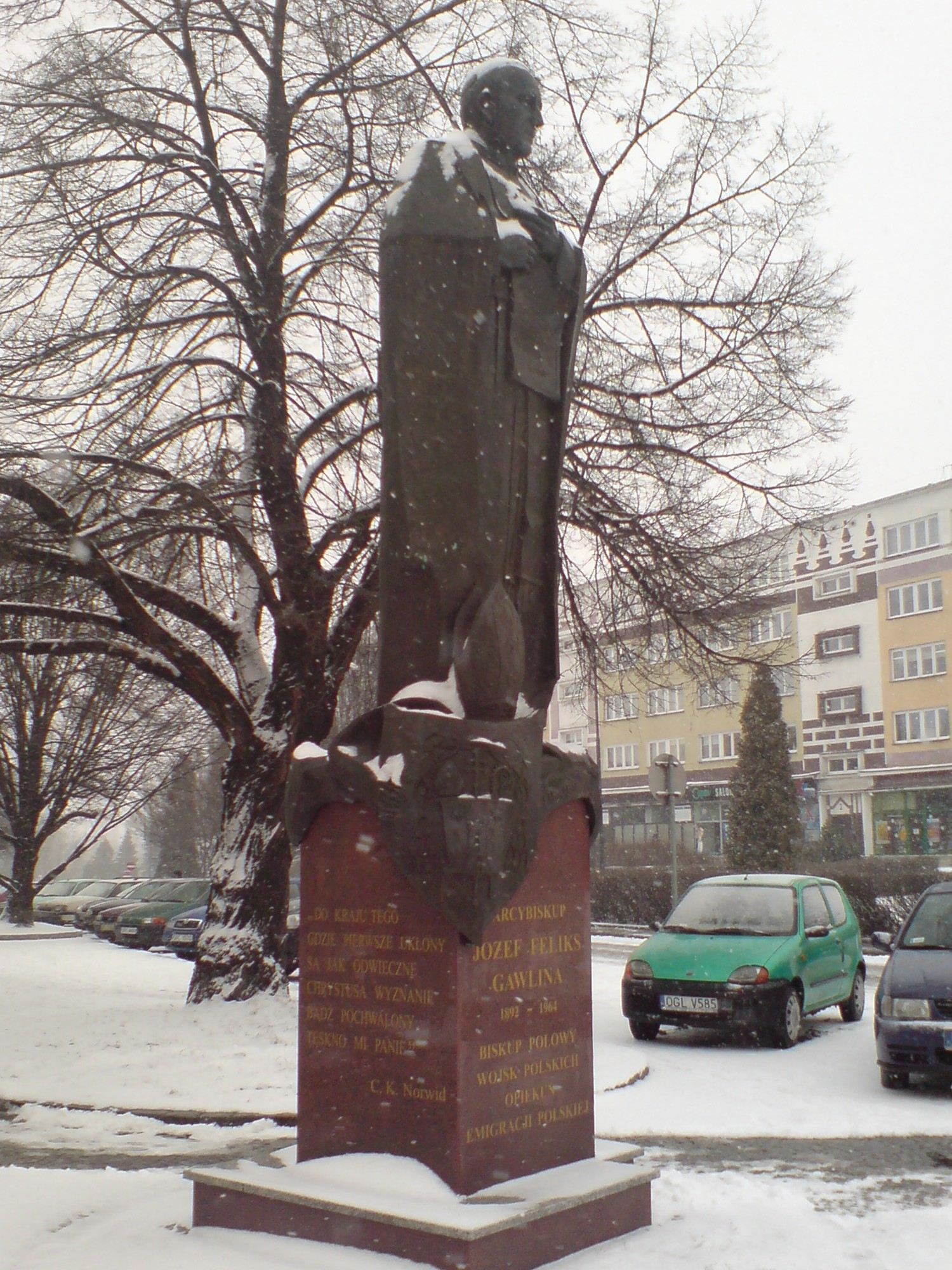
monument to Archbishop Gawlina in his birthplace, Racibórz

After the Second World War there were almost 200,000 discussed Poles - mainly soldiers, among them 120 Military chaplains and priests. In 1948, following a visit to Poland the previous year for talks with cardinal Hlond, and after consulting with the Catholic episcopate of England and Wales, Cardinal Griffin nominated the rector of the Polish Catholic Mission, rev. Staniszewski as Vicar delegate for civilian Poles in England and Wales, with the powers of an Ordinariate. Around this time Hlond had nominated Bishop Józef Gawlina, also a Divisional general and based in Rome, to be responsible overall for the Polish diaspora.

The temporary Polish parish hosted in Central London by the fathers of Brompton Oratory was able to be moved westward in 1962 to the newly acquired building from the vacating Scottish Presbyterians. It became St Andrew Bobola church in Shepherd's Bush, the second Polish owned church in London since 1930. The Mission was boosted by the integration of male religious orders, the Polish Jesuits in Willesden northwest London, the Marian fathers in Ealing and Fawley, and the Society of Christ Fathers, to deal with the Polish diaspora abroad who run a parish in Putney.

=== 21st century ===
The next wave of immigrants to the United Kingdom occurred after Poland's accession to the European Union and the opening of the UK job market to Poles, among other Central Europeans. Churches are full on Sundays, despite the estimate that 10% of Poles actually attend services regularly. The Polish Catholic Mission in England and Wales has charitable status

== Scotland ==
A separate Polish mission operates throughout Scotland.

== Sweden ==
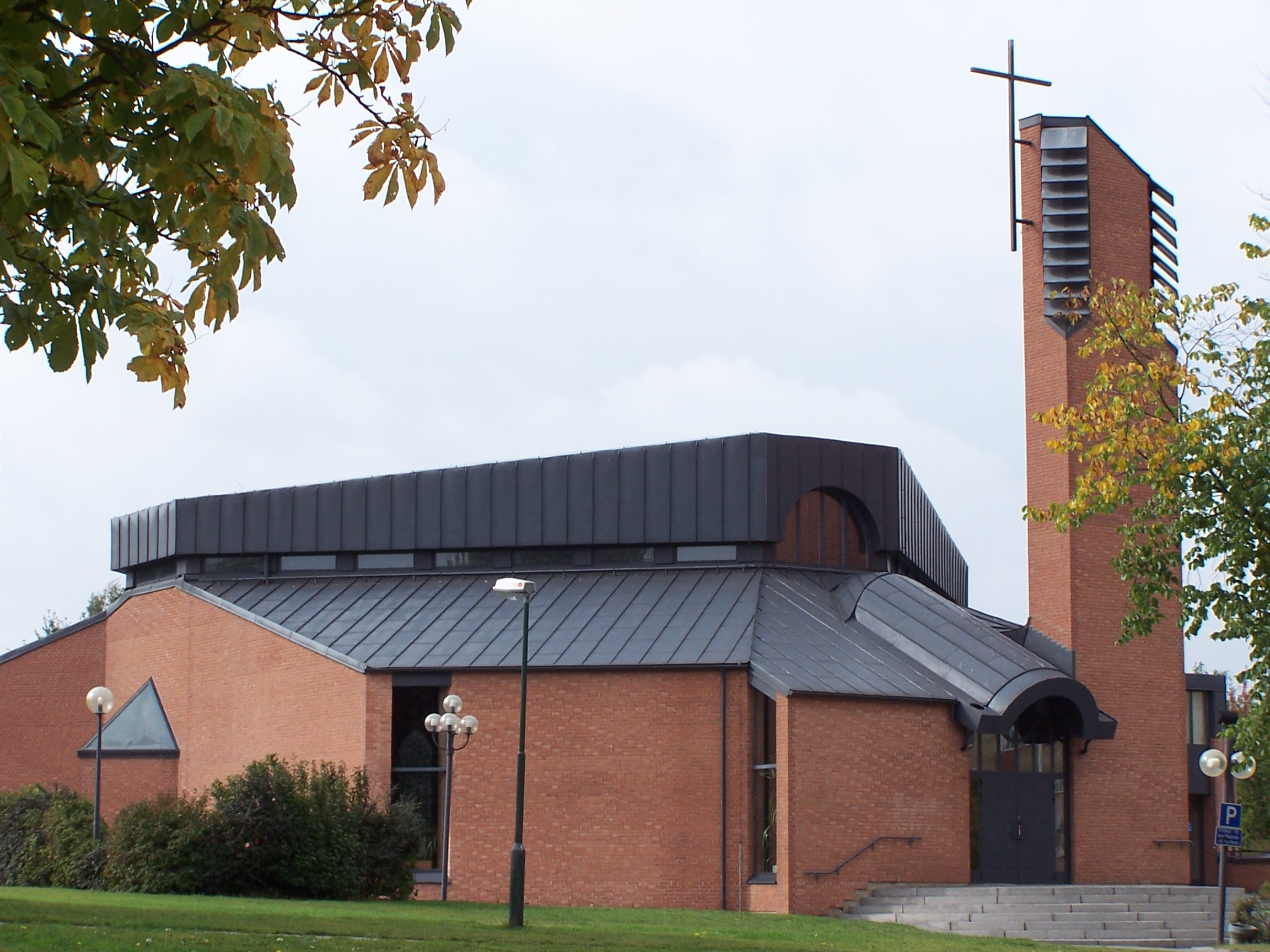
Sankta Maria i Rosengård church in Malmö

In Stockholm the Mission is called "Polska Katolska Missionen". In Malmö the mission operates in the Catholic churches of Maria and Rosengard.

== United States ==
The Society of Christ Fathers is a ministry for Poles
