= Eugenio Viola =

Italian art critic and curator (born 1975)

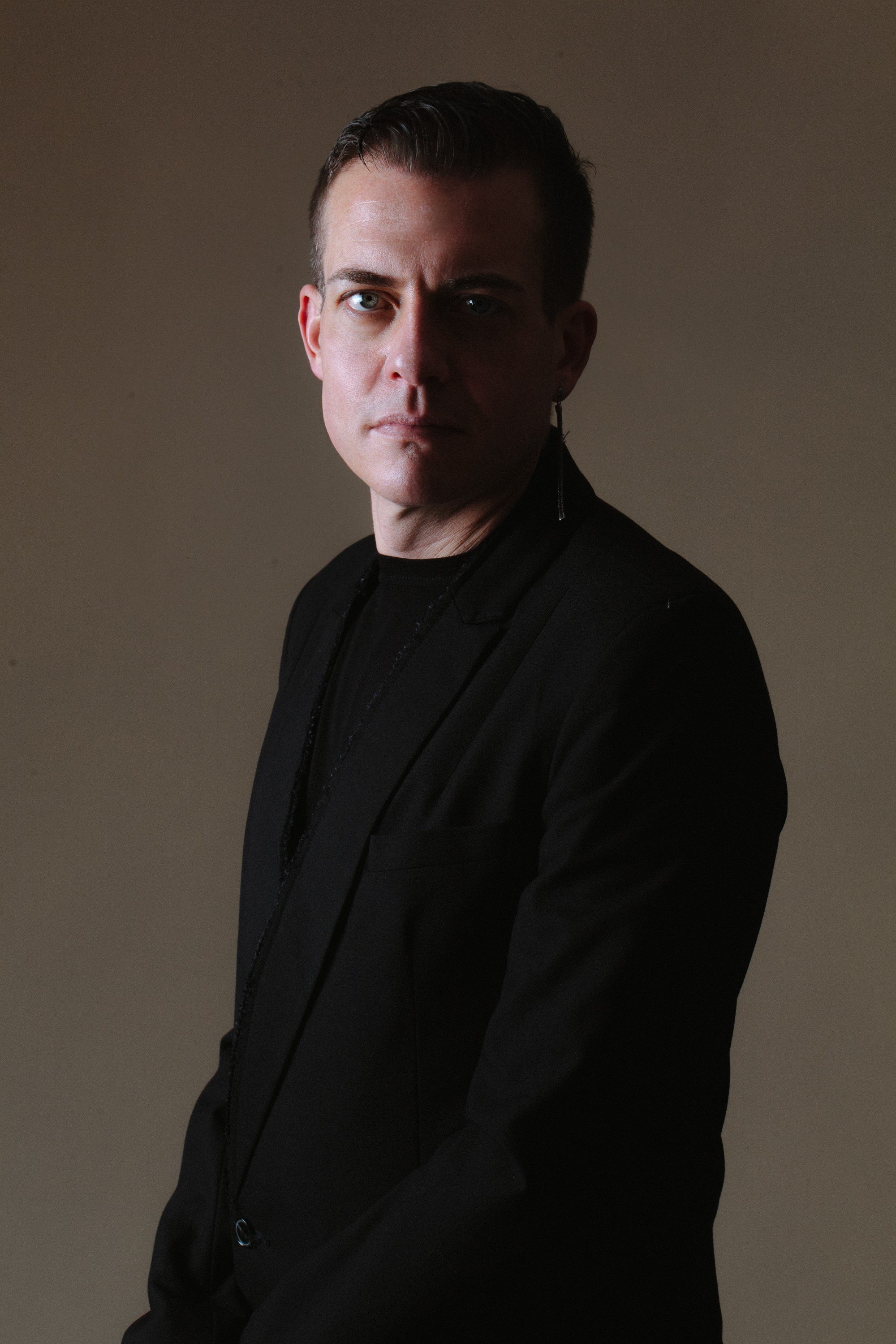
Portrait of Eugenio Viola by CAMO (Camilo Delgado Aguilera) in 2022

Eugenio Viola (Naples, 1975) is an Italian art critic and curator based in Bogotá.

Viola is the current Chief Curator of the Bogota Museum of Modern Art (MAMBO), Colombia. He is a prolific contributor of Artforum. Previously, he was curator of the Italian Pavilion at the 59th Biennale. He is also part of the jury and decision committee of the Julius Baer Prize for Latin American women artists.

As a thinker, Eugenio Viola is one "of the most talented and inspirational young people who are driving forward the art world today” as stated by the British art magazine Apollo in 2014. He was voted the best Italian curator in 2016 and 2019 by the Italian art magazine Artribune.

== Life and work ==
Born in Italy, Viola received his BA in “Cultural Heritage Conservation” from the University Suor Orsola Benincasa in Naples (2001), his MA in “Organization and Communication of the Visual Arts” from the Academy of Fine Arts of Brera, Milan (2002), and his Ph.D. in “Methods and Methodologies of Archaeological and Historical-Artistic Research” from the University of Salerno (2010).

Viola is the current Chief Curator of The Bogota Museum of Modern Art (MAMBO), a leading Colombian institution. His inaugural project there was the first institutional solo exhibition of work by Teresa Margolles (Estorbo, 2020) in Colombia, which opened in March 2019. During his tenure, he has commissioned major projects by Dor Guez (Catástrofe, 2021), Luz Lizarazo (Cicatrices, 2021–2022), Voluspa Jarpa (Sindemia, 2021–2022) and Miguel Angel Rojas (Regreso a la Maloca, 2021) among other artists.

He curates at the MAMBO ‘The Julius Baer Art Prize for Latin American Female Artists’, a biennial award initiated by Julius Baer and the Bogotá Museum of Modern Art – MAMBO, the first prize of its kind held in Latin America.

The award winner of the inaugural edition of the prize, Chilean artist Voluspa Jarpa (Rancagua, 1971), portrayed a necessary memory of the social unrest that occurred in both Chile and Colombia in late 2019. Her project Sindemia provided a multifaceted approach to the urgency for documentation and visibility of human rights violations during the protests. Sindemia will tour at the Gabriela Mistral Center (GAM) in Santiago, in March 2023, and at the MUNTREF, Center of Contemporary Art (Hotel of Immigrants), Buenos Aires, in July 2023.

From 2017 to 2019, Viola was the Senior Curator at the Perth Institute of Contemporary Arts (PICA), in Western Australia, where his curatorial practice was focused on cultivating and strengthening the institution's relationship with the Asia-Pacific region. He presented the first Australian solo exhibition of Kimsooja (Zone of Nowhere, 2018), in which the work extended beyond the walls of PICA and into the streets of Perth, where iterations of To Breathe – The Flags (2012-2018) materialized as site specific installations around the city. Viola has also been instrumental in a promising partnership between PICA and the Taipei Fine Arts Museum as part of the City of Perth and Taipei Residency Exchange Program.

From 2009 to 2016, he held a curatorial position at MADRE, the Contemporary Art Museum of Naples, Italy. From 2013 to 2016, as Curator at Large, he was responsible for the research and development of MADRE Museum's collection (Performing a collection project). He also co-curated the first Italian large-scale exhibitions of Boris Mikhailov and Francis Alÿs, retrospective exhibitions devoted to Vettor Pisani and Giulia Piscitelli, and a complex Daniel Buren’s site-specific project.

From 2009 to 2012, he was the Curator of the Project Room, a space dedicated to young and experimental artists organizing a network residence and exhibition program in partnership with institutions and art organizations from the Middle East (Transit project), and an annual performance festival named Corpus. Art in Action (2009-2012), where he presented site-specific performances of Ron Athey, Angela Barretta, Tobias Bernstrup, Andrea Cusumano, Kira O’Reilly, Jamie Shovlin and Lustfaust, Milica Tomic, Maria José Arjona, Tania Bruguera, Regina José Galindo, Teresa Margolles, among the others.

He curated the Italian Pavilion at the 59th Venice Biennial, Storia della Note e Destino delle Comete [History of Night and Destiny of Comets], which for the first time in the history of the Italian Pavilion presented the work of a single artist. In response to his appointment, he declared: “A decisive proposal, equating national participation alike other countries. It will be a visionary, courageous project, as is in Tosatti's chords and also in mine. Gian Maria Tosatti has an eccentric background. He has created powerful installations that combine many media, a bit like the synthesis of the arts. History of Night and Destiny of Comets is, for both of us, to date, the most important chapter in this tale, in which our stories once again intertwine and confront each other. This project also cannot fail to take into account our uncertain, metapandemic present”.

As a guest curator, Viola has worked extensively. He curated the Estonian Pavilion at the 56th Venice Biennial (Jaanus Samma, Not Suitable for Work. A Chairman’s Tale, 2015), whose iteration at the Museum of the Occupations in Tallinn was listed by the American Hyperallergic amongst the top 15 exhibitions around the world in 2016. Other major projects include: Regina José Galindo, Mechanisms of Power (Frankfurter Kunstverein, Frankfurt, Germany, 2016); The Prince and Queens by Karol Radziszewski (CoCA. Center of Contemporary Art, Torun, Poland,2014); Mark Raidpere's The Damage (EKKM- Contemporary Art Museum of Estonia, Tallinn, 2013); the first iteration of the pioneering Marina Abramović’s The Abramović Method (PAC - Contemporary Art Pavilion, Milan, Italy, 2012); and the most comprehensive retrospective of Orlan to date, Le Récit (Musée d’art moderne and contemporain de Saint Etienne Métropole, France, 2007).

He has curated over 70 exhibitions internationally.

== Writings and criticism ==
He has edited over 50 catalogues and books and contributed to numerous international publications. He is a scholar in theories and practices related to performance and Body Art. On this subject, he has extensively lectured in Italy and abroad. He has published several essays, and he has edited the monographs on Regina José Galindo (Ed. Skira, Milan, 2014), Hermann Nitsch (Ed. Morra, Naples, 2013), Marina Abramović (Ed. 24 Ore Cultura, Milan, 2012), and Orlan (Ed. Charta, Milan, 2007). He collaborates on a regular basis with Artforum (USA) and Arte (Italy). His writings also appeared in several Italian art magazines such as Flash Art, Segno, Arte e Critica, and the Spanish Exit Express. He is among the contributors of Quaderni d'arte italiana, the institutional magazine of Quadriennale di Roma.

=== Selected edited books and monographs ===
- Storia della Note e Destino delle Comete, Padiglione Italia, Padiglione Arte 2022. G.M. Tosatti, E. Viola (edited by), 2022, ed. Treccani, Roma, Italia. ISBN 8812-01008-3
- Unhallowed Arts, L. Wilson, O. Catts, E. Viola (edited by), 2018, Perth, Australia. ISBN 978-1-76080-016-1
- Jacobus Capone, Forgiving Night For Day. S. Pereira, A. Varano, E.Viola (edited by). “Jacobus Capone. Forgiving Night For Day”. 2017, PICA Press, Perth, Australia. ISBN 978-0-9923292-9-7
- Gian Maria Tosatti. Sette Stagioni dello Spirito. E. Viola (edited by). 2017, Mondadori Electa. ISBN 9788891812872
- Vettor Pisani. Eroica/antieroica. Una monografia
- L. Cherubini, A. Viliani, E. Viola, “Vettor Pisani. Eroica/antieroica. Una monografia” 2016, Mondadori Electa. ISBN 978-8891808332
- Intrigantes Incertitudes, L. Hegyi, E. Viola (edited by) “Intrigantes incertitudes”, 2016, Fage editions, Lyon, France. ISBN 978-2849754085
- Jaanus Samma. Not Suitable for Work, A Chairman's Tale, M. Arusoo, K. Moss, M. Kangro, S. Mogutin, R. Põldsam, R. Taavetti, E. Viola (edited by). 2015, Sternberg Press, Berlin, Germany. ISBN 9783956791451
- Sven Marquardt: Götterdämmerung. The Twilight of the Gods, E. Debandi, E. Viola (edited by), 2015, Skira, Italy. ISBN 978-8857226651
- Regina José Galindo. Estoy viva, D. Sileo, E. Viola (edited by), Skira Editore, Milan, 2014.
- Hermann Nitsch, 135. Aktion, A. Tolve, E. Viola (edited by), Ed. Morra, Naples, 2013. ISBN 88-7852-029-2
- DAMAGE: Mark Raidpere, A. Härm, E. Viola (edited by), 2013, Lugemik, Tallinn. ISBN 978-9949-9391-8-3
- Marina Abramović. The Italian Works, M. Abramović, R. Barilli, A. Bonito Oliva, G. Celant, G.Dorfles, A. Tolve, A.Vettese, D. Sileo, E. Viola (edited by), 2012, 24 Ore Cultura, Milan. ISBN 978-88-6648-100-3
- Marina Abramović. The Abramović Method, M. Abramović, C. Bertola, L.Cherubini, A. Rispoli, D. Sileo, E. Viola (edited by), 2012, 24 Ore Cultura, Milan. ISBN 978-886-648-090-7
- Orlan; Hegyi, Lóránd; Viola, Eugenio (2007). Orlan : le récit = the narrative. Milano: Charta. ISBN 978-88-8158-652-3. OCLC 145723628.
