= Waldemar Januszczak =

English journalist (born 1954)

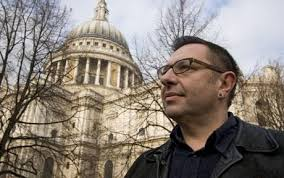
- Born: 12 January 1954 (age 72); Basingstoke, Hampshire, England
- Education: University of Manchester
- Occupations: Art critic and television presenter

Waldemar Januszczak (born 12 January 1954) is a British art critic and television documentary producer and presenter. Formerly the art critic of The Guardian, he took the same role at The Sunday Times in 1992, and has twice won the "Critic of the Year" award.

== Early life and education ==
Januszczak was born in Basingstoke, Hampshire, England, to Polish refugees who had arrived in England after the Second World War.

In Poland his father had been a policeman in Sanok, a job that included exposing Communists. In the UK, he worked as a railway carriage cleaner, but died, aged 57, when a train ran him over at Basingstoke railway station. His widow, then aged 33, found work as a dairymaid. Waldemar was one year old at the time.

According to Januszczak in Holbein: Eye of the Tudors, he attended St Anne's (Roman Catholic) Primary School in Caversham, Berkshire, between the ages of five and 11.

The young Januszczak attended Divine Mercy College, a school for the children of Polish refugees which the Congregation of Marian Fathers had set up at Fawley Court, Henley-on-Thames. He notes that he was subject to severe corporal punishment, because the priests "spread God’s goodness among us by whipping us and caning us on a nightly basis... Once, a woman teacher hit me with a wooden coat hanger, leaving bruises that lasted until the summer holidays, when my mother saw them. Another time, one of the kinkier priests made me take my trousers down and flayed my bare arse with a leather belt buckle. Not once did I flinch."

After learning about the existence of art history, Januszczak decided to pursue it as a degree. He chose history of art at the University of Manchester because it was "the farthest away from home." The faculty was strong, including Dr. Dodwell, "a respected medievalist who made sure we received an old-fashioned grounding in the full story of art." He refers to the modernist Andrew Causey as "a brilliant expert." He studied Van Gogh with Griselda Pollock, who later became one of the most eminent feminist art critics. Nicholas Penny, a late arrival to the faculty, went on to become the long-standing director of the National Gallery.

== Career ==
When a new listings magazine appeared called the New Manchester Review, Januszczak volunteered to be its cartoonist, but after some months, the editor told him: “These are really shit. Is there anything else you can do?,” which is how he began writing art reviews. One of those reviews came to the attention of an editor at the Guardian, who was looking for a reviewer to cover Northern England.

Januszczak has had a dual career in print and electronic media, having worked for the BBC when he was still a college student. One observer says of his documentary films that they "reveal immense curiosity for the ever-evolving, all-encompassing universe of culture, and each is presented with humour, gusto, and incredible if equally approachable intelligence."

Januszczak became an art critic, and then books editor, of The Guardian. In 1989, he was appointed head of arts at Channel 4 television. In the seven years he spent there he televised the Turner Prize for the first time and the Glastonbury Festival. He started the series J'Accuse, commissioned a final interview in 1994 with the playwright Dennis Potter by Melvyn Bragg, and started the music series The White Room.

In 1992 he became art critic for The Sunday Times. He has been voted Critic of the Year twice by the Press Association.

In 1997 he took part in a Channel 4 discussion called The Death of Painting, occasioned by the absence of painters from that year's Turner Prize. The programme was made famous when an apparently drunk Tracey Emin swore at the other participants and left after ten minutes. In 2002, when insurance broker and art collector Ivan Massow lashed out at conceptual art in general and said that Emin could not "think her way out of a paper bag", Januszczak observed in a letter to The Independent that "thinking" would not be very helpful in those circumstances.

In 2004 he differed from most critics in his defence of the art of Stella Vine, singling her out for praise in his otherwise hostile review of the Saatchi Gallery's New Blood show ("although I didn't much want to like Vine's contribution, I found I did. It had something."), and continuing to champion her, seeing "a combination of empathy and cynicism that can be startling." Later that year, he took part in a Christmas special critics edition of the television quiz show University Challenge.

Reviewing the exhibition Americans in Paris at London's National Gallery in 2006, he described James McNeill Whistler's Symphony in White, No. 1: The White Girl as "a clumsy bit of cake-making with thick smudges of white rubbed into the canvas in coarse, dry skid marks". "Even Whistler's renowned mother manages here to underwhelm", he said. Hoaxed by artist Jamie Shovlin, Januszczak later that year "revealed" in his paper how the 1970s glam rock band Lustfaust had "cocked a notorious snook at the music industry in the late 1970s by giving away their music on blank cassettes and getting their fans to design their own covers". The band had never existed outside Shovlin's fiction. Januszczak replied that Shovlin should be applauded for his capacity to remind us of the crucial place of the artist in today's society as he made clear that "Reality simply cannot be trusted any more".

In October 2008 Januszczak co-curated a show at the British Museum called Statuephilia, in which modern sculptures by six artists were shown next to their more ancient counterparts. The show was inspired during his creation of the series The Sculpture Diaries, a three-part series on sculpture around the world, which was first aired on 31 August 2008 on Channel 4.

One of the original presenters of The Late Show on BBC 2, Januszczak has made many appearances on television, presenting programmes on the history of art, and appearing on The Culture Show and Newsnight Review. Beginning on 27 November 2012, he presented a four-part series The Dark Ages: An Age of Light about the art and architecture of the Dark Ages on BBC Four.

In October 2019 he directed and narrated Handmade in Bolton on BBC Four, a short documentary series featuring Shaun Greenhalgh and fronted by Janina Ramirez.

He produces content for the art channel Perspective, part of the Little Dot Studios Network (All3Media) and for Sky Arts.

== Personal life ==
Januszczak's wife, artist Yumi Katayama, is the daughter of the tanka poet, literary critic, and magazine editor Teibi Katayama (1922–2008), who was influential in postwar Japanese classical poetry circles.

== Films ==
Januszczak has been making films since 1997 with his production company ZCZ Films.

- The Truth About Art (Channel 4, 1998), a three-episode series about why some subjects have such a hold on the human imagination.
- The Lost Supper (Channel 4, 1999), about the restoration of The Last Supper.
- The Cowboy and the Eclipse (Channel 4, 1999), about James Turrell's earthwork sculpture in Cornwall.
- Mad Tracey from Margate (BBC, 1999), about Tracey Emin.
- Puppy Love (Channel 4, 2000), about Januszczak's modest dislike of dogs and intense hatred of dog aficionados.
- Travels in Virtual Japan (Channel 4, 2000), about Japanese technological innovation.
- Building of the Year (Channel 4, 2000, 2001, 2002, 2003). Coverage of the annual Stirling Prize for new architecture.
- Picasso: Magic, Sex, Death (Channel 4, 2001), with the artist's friend and biographer, John Richardson. (Three-episode series)
- Gauguin: The Full Story (BBC, 2003), about Paul Gauguin.
- Beijing Swings (Channel 4, 2003), about extreme art in Beijing.
- Every Picture Tells A Story / The Art Mysteries Series 01 (Channel 5, 2003/2004), about the backgrounds of eight masterpieces. (8-episode series)
- Vincent: The Full Story (Channel 4, 2004), about Vincent van Gogh. (Three-episode series)
- The Michelangelo Code: Secrets of the Sistine Chapel (Channel 4, 2005).
- Kazakhstan Swings (Channel 4, 2006), about contemporary art in Kazakhstan.
- Toulouse-Lautrec: The Full Story (Channel 4, 2006), about Henri de Toulouse-Lautrec.
- Sickert vs Sargent (BBC, 2007), about the war between two immigrants–Walter Sickert and John Singer Sargent–for the soul of British art.
- Paradise Found (Channel 4, 2007), about Islamic architecture and Islamic art.
- The Happy Dictator (Channel 4, 2007), about the former president of Turkmenistan.
- Atlas: Japan Revealed (Discovery Channel, 2008). Series 3, Episode 2 in the Discovery Atlas series. (Januszczak was executive producer only; not as an on-camera presenter or narrator.)
- The Sculpture Diaries (Channel 4, 2008), about sculptural depictions of women and leaders, as well as earthworks and land art. (Three-episode series)
- Baroque! – From St Peter's to St Paul's (BBC, 2009). An overview of the Baroque in many of its key locations. (Three-episode series)
- Manet: the Man Who Invented Modern Art (BBC, 2009), about Édouard Manet and his influence on art.
- Ugly Beauty (BBC, 2009), about contemporary art.
- William Dobson The Lost Genius of British Art (BBC, 2011)
- Art of the Night (BBC, 2011)
- The Impressionists: Painting and Revolution (BBC, 2011) (Four-episode series)
- The Dark Ages: An Age of Light (BBC, 2012) (Four-episode series)
- Rococo: Travel, Pleasure, Madness (BBC, 2014) (Three-episode series)
- Rubens: An Extra Large Story (BBC, 2015)
- Holbein: Eye of the Tudors (BBC, 2015)
- The Renaissance Unchained (BBC 4, 2016) (Four-episode series)
- Mary Magdalene: Art's Scarlet Woman (BBC, 2017)
- Big Sky Big Dreams Big Art: Made in the USA (BBC, 2018) (Three-episode series)
- Handmade in Bolton (BBC, 2019) (Four-episode series)
- The Art Mysteries (Series 2, BBC, 2020) (Four-episode series)
- My Ukrainian Journey (Sky Arts, 2022)
- Anish Kapoor: Stupid Naughty Boy (Sky Arts, 2022)
- The Mystery of the Nativity (Sky Arts, 2022)
- Art's Wildest Movement: Mannerism (Sky Arts, 2024) (Three-episode series)
- The Art Mysteries (Series 3, Sky Arts, 2024)
- Art's Most (Erotic, Horrific and Satanic) (Sky Arts, 2025) (Three-episode series)

== Comments on the Turner Prize ==
- On the Turner Prize (1984):

The British art establishment, having already shown unforgivable ignorance and wickedness in its dealings with Turner's own Bequest to the nation, is now bandying his name about in the hope of giving some spurious historical credibility to a new prize cynically concocted to promote the interest of a small group of dealers, gallery directors and critics.

- On the Turner Prize (1985):

The Turner Prize, like the root of the Arts Council, the rise of business sponsorship with strings attached, the growing importance of the PR man in art, the mess at the V&A, and the emergence of the ignorant "art consultant" is the direct result of inadequate government support for the arts. Forced out into the business circus, art has had to start clowning around.

== See also ==
- Poles in the United Kingdom
- Józef Jarzębowski
