= Battle of Horki =

The Battle of Horki was a series of three clashes between Polish-Lithuanian insurgent forces and units of the Imperial Russian Army during the January Uprising. It took place between 17 and 25 May 1863 in the village of Horki near Kobryn, Russian Empire (now Belarus). Insurgent forces were commanded by Romuald Traugutt.

In late April 1863, an insurgent unit consisting of volunteers from the area of Kobryn concentrated near Horki. It had almost 200 men, including 32 civil servants from Kobryn, who joined the insurrection. The party, commanded by Romuald Traugutt, was quickly noticed by Imperial Russian authorities, which decided to act.

On 17 May 1863 Traugutt carried out an ambush, in which a Russian detachment of infantry and Cossacks was destroyed. The Russians retreated, losing 70 men, and their commandant, Colonel Ehrnberg, sent for reinforcements. Four days later, on 21 May, Russian forces attacked again, but after losing 12 men, they withdrew from Horki. Finally, on 25 May, strong Russian forces surrounded the insurgents. After a three-hour battle, the insurgents dispersed, losing 13 men. The Russians captured Polish camp, with 20 wagons and 50 horses.

The Battle of Horki was in 1990 commemorated on Warsaw's Tomb of the Unknown Soldier, with inscription: “HORKI 17 - 25 V 1863”.

== Sources ==
- Stefan Kieniewicz: Powstanie styczniowe. Warszawa: Państwowe Wydawnictwo Naukowe, 1983. ISBN 83-01-03652-4.
