= Haunch of Venison =

Defunct contemporary art gallery

Coordinates: 51.5135°N 0.1467°W

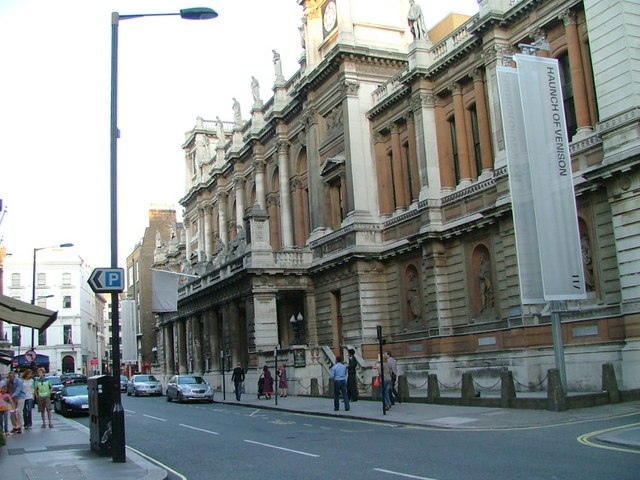
The Haunch of Venison in 2009

Haunch of Venison was a contemporary art gallery in London, England, operating from 2002 until 2013. It supported the work of contemporary leading artists, presented a broad and critically acclaimed program of exhibitions to a large public through international exhibition spaces in London and New York.

== History ==
Haunch of Venison was founded in 2002, and named after the London courtyard (Haunch of Venison Yard) in which the original gallery space was based. In 2007, Haunch of Venison became a subsidiary of Christie’s International plc. but continues to operate as an independent company run by Senior International Director Emilio Steinberger.

Artists represented by Haunch of Venison include Rina Banerjee, Justin Mortimer, Thomas Heatherwick, Jitish Kallat, Jamie Shovlin, Joana Vasconcelos and Turner Prize nominees Richard Long, Simon Patterson, Katie Paterson and Nathan Coley.

The London gallery temporarily relocated to 6 Burlington Gardens from March 2009 to November 2011. Inaugurating Haunch of Venison's residency at 6 Burlington Gardens, the British Museum’s old Museum of Mankind, a group exhibition titled Mythologies turned the huge building into a giant cabinet of curiosities. In September 2011, the London gallery moved back to its original location at Haunch of Venison Yard, following extensive renovations by leading architect Annabelle Selldorf.

In March 2012, Haunch of Venison opened a second gallery space in London, located on Eastcastle Street in Fitzrovia. The new space, launched with an exhibition by young Scottish artist Katie Paterson (9 March – 28 April). The new space is situated in Fitzrovia; an area known historically for its artist communities and in recent years home to a number of significant contemporary art galleries.

As of 28 March 2013, Haunch of Venison ceased to represent artists, and the gallery spaces were combined with Christie’s Private Sales to focus on the secondary market.

== New York and Berlin ==
Haunch of Venison opened in New York in September 2008. The inaugural exhibition, "Abstract Expressionism - A World Elsewhere" - curated by David Anfam - showcased the paintings, sculptures and photographs of Franz Kline, Willem de Kooning, Lee Krasner, Barnett Newman, Jackson Pollock, Mark Rothko, Aaron Siskind, David Smith, and Clyfford Still. 2011 saw a survey exhibition of paintings by Peter Saul. The New York gallery was based in the Rockefeller Center from 2008 to 2011. In September 2011, the gallery relocated to a new space in Chelsea, also redesigned by Annabelle Selldorf.

Haunch of Venison Berlin opened in September 2007 and closed in December 2010. The gallery was located next to the city’s contemporary art museum the Hamburger Bahnhof in a former industrial space allowing for the presentation of one-off projects and large-scale exhibitions. A concert by the fictional band "Lustfaust" presented by Jamie Shovlin marked the opening. The last exhibition was a solo show by Yoko Ono.

== Corporate Identity ==
The gallery’s logo and stationery was designed by Tony Brook in 2006.
