= Fawley Court =

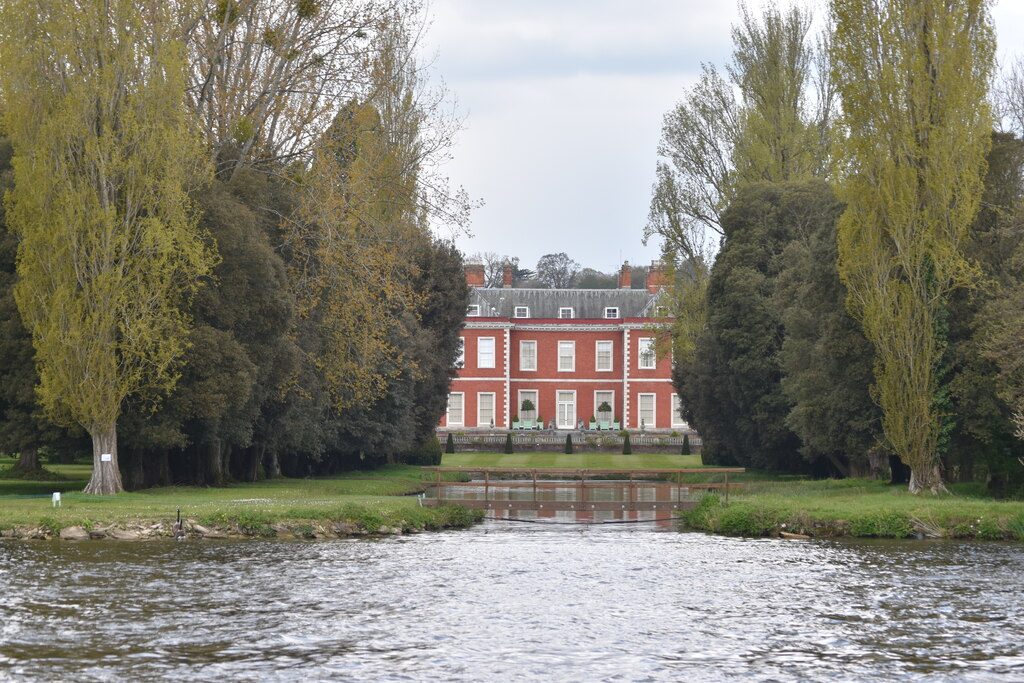
- Fawley court viewed from the eastern shore of the Thames

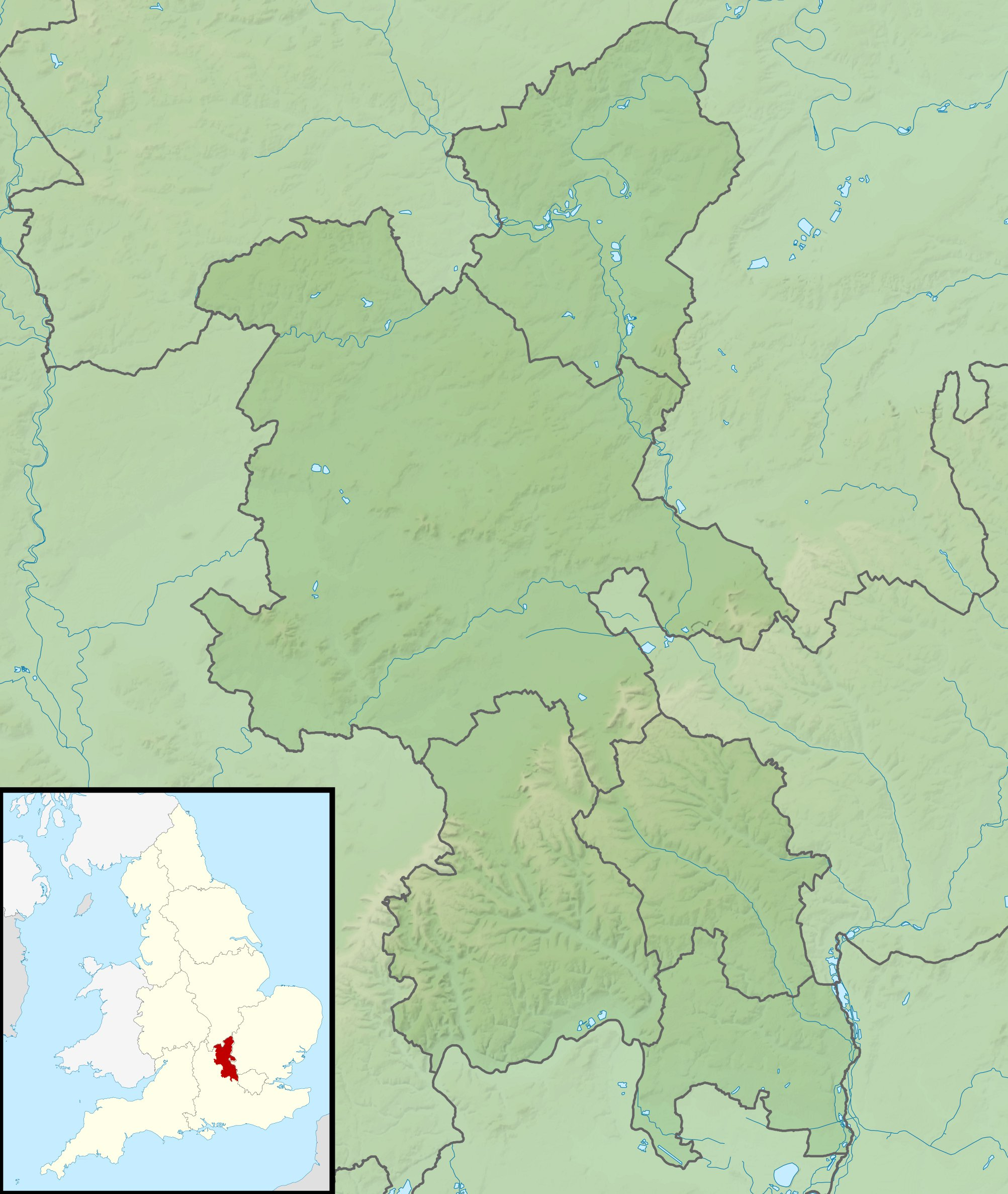
- Location within Buckinghamshire
- 51.5516°N 0.8978°W
- Type: House
- Location: Fawley, Buckinghamshire, England

History
- Built: 17th and 18th centuries

Site notes
- Architect(s): attributed to Sir Christopher Wren and Capability Brown
- Architectural style: Neoclassical
- Governing body: Privately owned

Listed Building – Grade I
- Official name: Fawley Court
- Designated: 7 July 1952
- Reference no.: 1125740

Fawley Court is a country house, with large mixed-use grounds standing on the west bank of the River Thames at Fawley in the English county of Buckinghamshire. Its former estate once encompassed both adjacent Phyllis Court as well as Henley Park which served as the dower house. It had a very extensive estate including a deer park and a considerable number of other buildings and farms.

Following World War II, it was run as Divine Mercy College by the Polish Congregation of Marian Fathers, with its associated library, museum and was one of the cultural centres for the Polish community in the United Kingdom until its closure and sale in 2009. It is Grade I listed for its architecture.

== Parts and location ==
The main building sits five times its length away from the river, 600m along the 2112m Henley Royal Regatta course and has a private promenade covering approximately half of the course,

== History ==
=== Early history ===
Under Edward the Confessor in 1065 the Domesday Book notes Earl Tosti held this land as the manor of Fawley, connected with the village itself which sits atop the hill behind.

After the Conquest, Fawley Manor was given by William I to his kinsman Walter Giffard, who was one of the leading compilers of the Domesday Book. His steward Herbrand de Sackville was holding it when the book was compiled in 1086, and the Sackvilles held it until it passed through the marriage of the Sackville heiress Margery, to Thomas Rokes, in 1477.

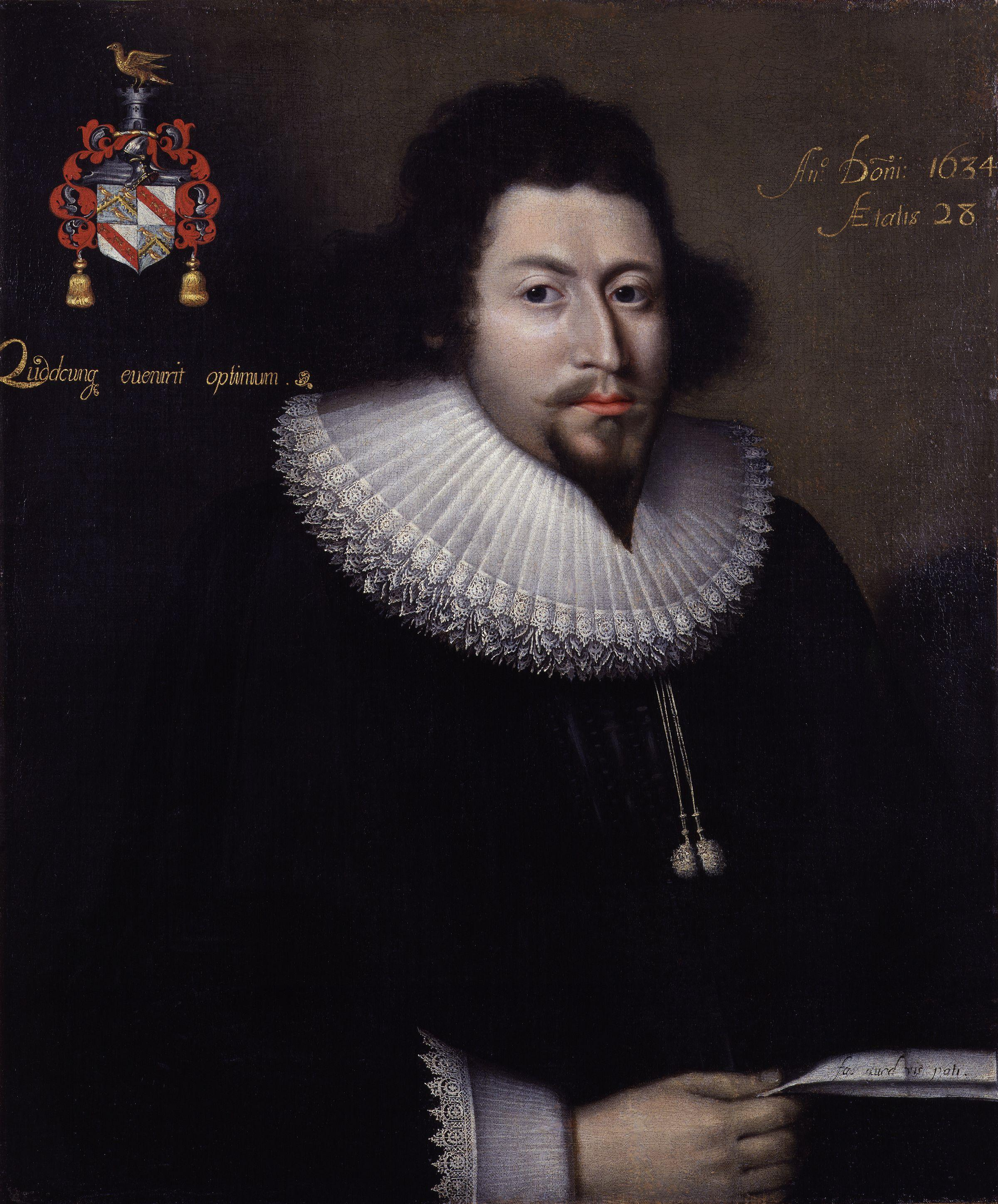
Bulstrode Whitelocke from NPG

In 1616, Fawley was sold to Sir James Whitelocke, a judge . On his death in 1632 Fawley passed to his son, Sir Bulstrode Whitelocke, who was a parliamentarian and judge who owned much land in Remenham and also bought adjoining smaller Phyllis Court and larger Henley Park in 1638. During the Civil War, Fawley was the scene of fighting between the Roundheads and Royalist troops commanded by Prince Rupert of the Rhine. Since Bulstrode Whitelocke was a Parliament supporter, Royalist soldiers were quartered in the house under Sir John Byron having ransacked it in 1642. After the Restoration of the Monarchy Bulstrode gave the damaged house to his son James Whitelocke, who, having failed to repair it, mortgaged it to William Freeman. When the loan was not repaid William Freeman bought out the remainder.

In 1684 the house was completely rebuilt for Freeman, a plantation and slave owner and merchant. The resulting main house is a large square brick and stone house with two tall storeys, plus basement and attic. The symmetrical plan is ranged either side of an entrance hall entered from the west, with the identically proportioned saloon beyond; the principal apartments and staircases are placed in equal-sized blocks on either side, projecting slightly on the west and east fronts. The stair hall in the southwest block was originally open to the entrance hall. Now accessed from the entrance hall since about +-1771 the wooden staircase is not the original but a ninethhenth century replacement neven though it has twist-turned balusters typical of the late seventeenth century. The centres of the north and south fronts are slightly broken forward and capped with pediments. The Ionic entrance portico on the west front was a much later addition.

During the Glorious Revolution of 1688, William III of Orange stayed in the house during his march from Torbay to London, and received a loyal declaration from peers and an address from the Corporation of London. Interior finishing was ongoing however as the plasterwork of the saloon ceiling bears the date 1690; bearing the arms of Freeman and of Baxter, William's spouse. Its confident bold relief tempted Geoffrey Beard to ascribe it to London plasterer William Parker, whose comparable work at Denham Place is documented.

Following Freeman's death the estate passed to John Cooke his nephew, a merchant, dilettante and amateur architect, who under William's will changed his name to Freeman. He was an early member of the Society of Antiquaries, built the Gothic folly in the grounds and the Freeman family mausoleum in the village based on the design of the tomb of Caecilla Metella in Rome. He buried a time capsule of contemporary artefacts in a mound resembling a round barrow on the estate. These were rediscovered in the early 20th century when the site was excavated by archaeologists. Examples of its many day to day household items of the early 18th century are in the River and Rowing Museum in Henley.

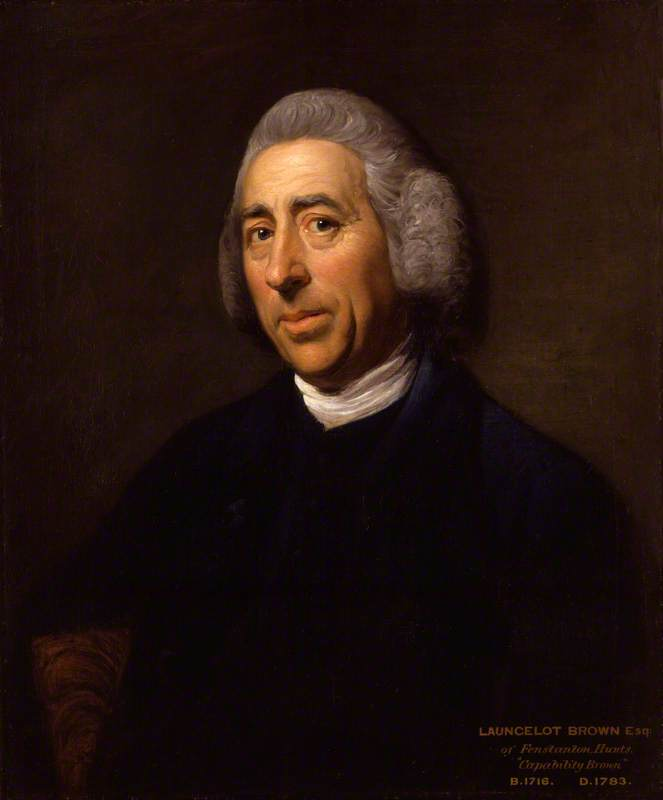
Portrait of Capability Brown by Nathaniel Dance-Holland, 1769

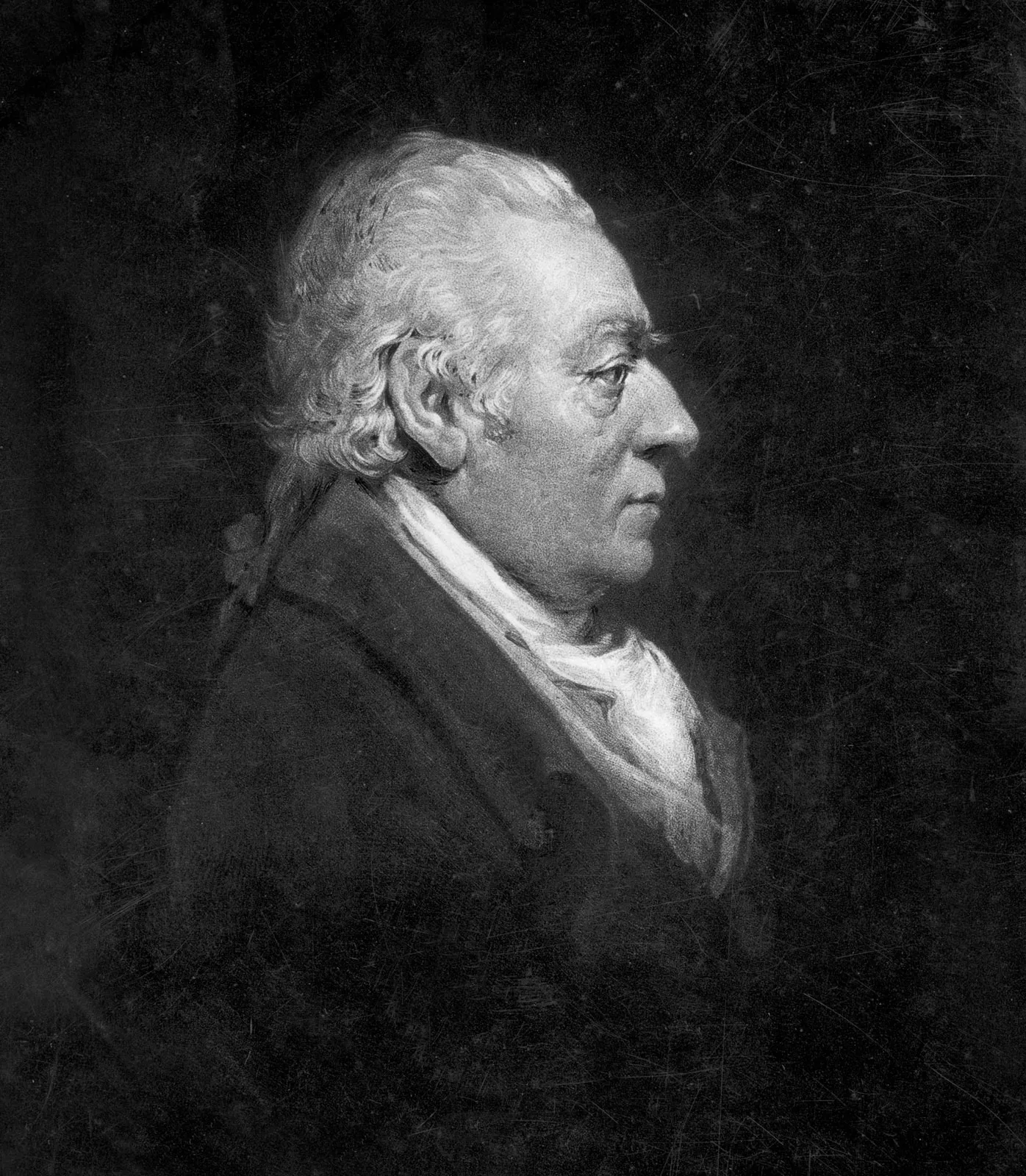
James Wyatt, anonymous aquatint

Between 1764 and 1766 the grounds were dramatically landscaped for Sambrooke Freeman by Capability Brown. Shortly thereafter the architect James Wyatt, not yet made famous by his Pantheon, London, worked on decorations in new rooms in the house (1770–71), where doorcases and chimneypieces in Wyatt's early neoclassical style and the decoration of the Library reflect his presence. Fawley may have been Wyatt's first country house commission. He also designed "the temple", a folly and fishing lodge, on Temple Island. One of two drawings securely attributed to Wyatt that appeared at a Christie's auction, 30 November 1983, is for the interior of the island temple, which was the earliest essay in England of an "Etruscan" style, its pale green walls painted as if hung with "antique" black and terracotta figured tablets and medallions. The drawing that accompanied it is for the Drawing Room ceiling, as executed.

Drawings by James Wyatt's brother Samuel suggested to Eileen Harris that he was responsible for the barn with an apsidal end, which survives (with some nineteenth-century changes) at Fawley. The recent improvements at Fawley were praised by Mrs Lybbe Powys in 1771. The brick facades were stuccoed about 1800, and were restored with new brick in the nineteenth century. Both George III and George IV visited the house.

=== 19th century to 1950s ===
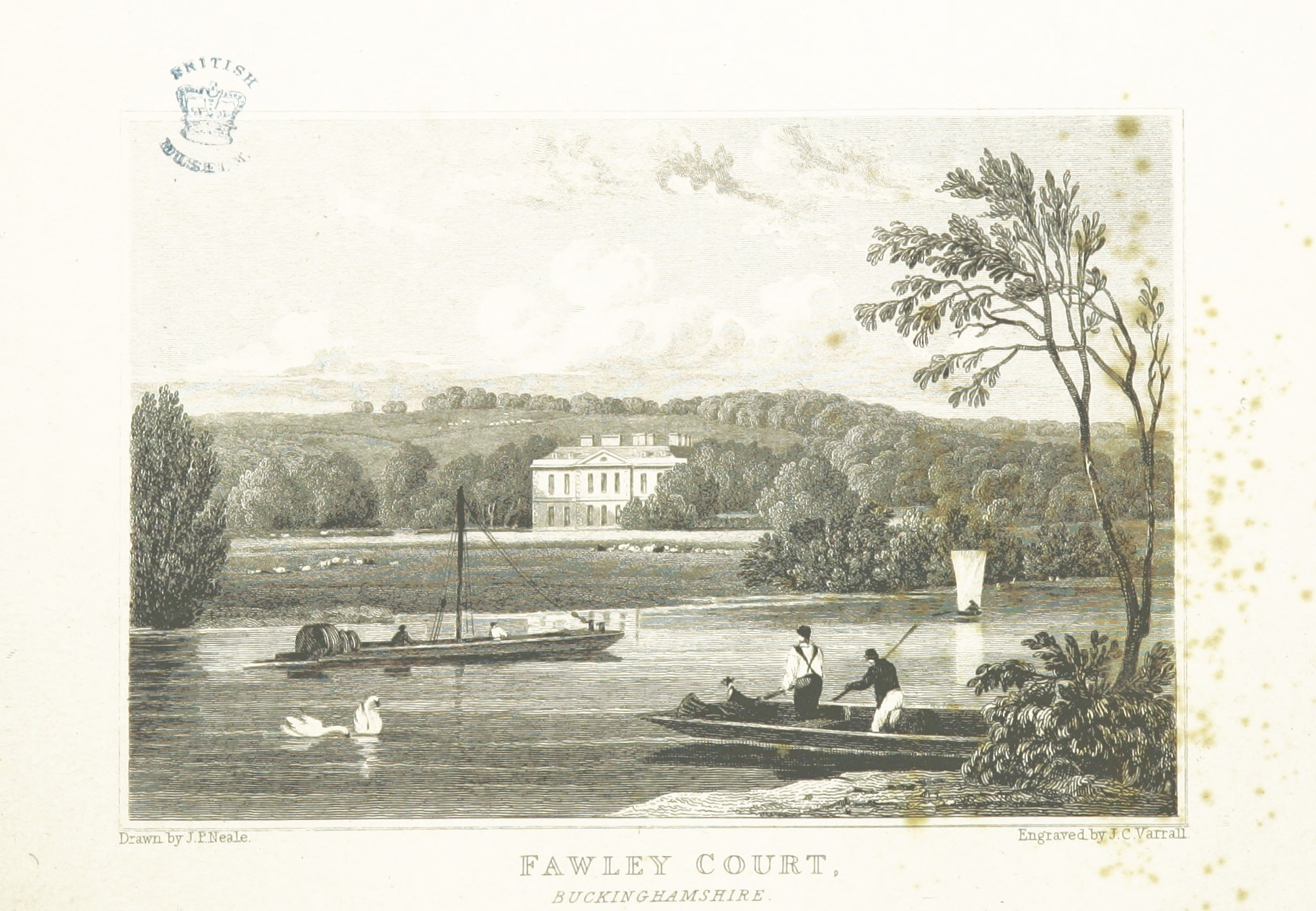
Fawley Court, Buckinghamshire in 1826

Strickland Freeman, the nephew of Sambrooke Freeman, wrote works on equitation and veterinary aspects of horsemanship and botany. He was considered a progressive landlord to his agricultural tenants he participated in advancing farming techniques and practices deemed by some revolutionary.

Strickland Freeman died without a son and heir. This was basically the end of the Freeman line whose history and achievements in a relatively short time frame were indeed meritorious and make fascinating reading The estate passed to William Peere Williams, a distant relative. He again respected William Freeman's will to be able entitled inherit and changed his name to William Peere Williams-Freeman. After extensive and lengthy litigation his heirs eventually put the estate up for auction.

Fawley Court was sold to the railway contractor Edward Mackenzie in 1853. He retired to Fawley following many successful ventures developing major stages of the railway network in France, following the decline due to ill health and death of his partner and brother, the famous civil engineer and railway builder, William Mackenzie. Edward Mackenzie himself died in 1880, and the house was inherited by his son, William Dalziel Mackenzie, who commissioned the Lancaster architects Paley and Austin to extend the house. This took place in 1883, and consisted of the addition of a wing, containing a study, a billiard room, smoking rooms, and bedrooms, together with terraces around the house.

It is reputed to have been Kenneth Grahame's inspiration for Toad Hall in his book The Wind in the Willows, written in 1908.

Fawley Court was requisitioned by the British Army and used in the World War II by special forces for training. Maurice Roe (b. 4 June 1917 - d.6/5/2014 - military medal 1945) was trained there as a radio operator prior to his insertion into France as described by the obituary on the Telegraph 26 June 2014. He served both as a commando and as a member of the SOE (special operations executive) and as a Jedburgh. It was left it in a poor state after the war.

== Polish cultural destination ==
=== Divine Mercy College ===
In 1953 the house and surrounding grounds with an exceptional river frontage on the Thames were purchased by the British province of the Polish Congregation of Marian Fathers, in answer to the demand from the post World War II newly settled Polish community, for use as an independent educational establishment known as, Divine Mercy College and as a religious house. The enterprise was in straitened financial circumstances from the start and, as a charitable institution, relied heavily on public support to build the residential accommodation for the pupils and to keep it running. It was intended for boys of Polish descent but accepted local children as well as those from overseas, e.g. from Ghana, Mauritius and Hong Kong. At its peak the school catered for 150 boys of 9 to 19 years of age and offered a rounded education including university entrance exams. An alumnus of the time is Waldemar Januszczak, the prominent British art critic (born 1954). The house was severely damaged by fire in 1973, but was rebuilt with the help of donations from the Polish community in Britain and abroad. The school finally closed in 1986 due to falling rolls of students of Polish origin, and the Marian Fathers converted Fawley Court into a 'Retreat and Conference Centre'.

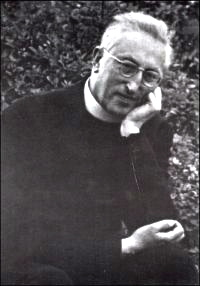
Fr. Jarzębowski (1897-1964) founder of Divine Mercy College and Fawley Court Museum

==== Fawley Court's 'Jarzębowski' Museum ====
The energetic founder and headmaster, Fr. Józef Jarzębowski, was captivated by history, especially events around the 1863 January Uprising. He was also a keen collector, since before the war, of Polish Militaria and historical materials. Fortuitously, they found a suitable setting in the august Wyatt interiors of the main house. In time, Fawley Court housed a Museum of national significance and is the subject of a detailed study published by the National Library of Poland.

The collection comprised a number of sculptures, most notably an Antonine period marble bust said to be of the juvenile Commodus, that Fr. Jarzębowski had brought back from Mexico in 1944. It had been on loan to the Ashmolean Museum (1973-1985) but after a failed attempt to sell it in 1985, it was finally sold at a Christie's auction in 2005. Also sold in 1985 was an earlier acquisition, by John Freeman, of a fragment from the Pergamon Altar that Freeman had placed over the entrance to the Gothic folly in the grounds. The Jarzębowski collection also contained: an armoury of the 16th–19th centuries of European, Asian and Far Eastern provenance, other militaria ranging from the last Polish uprising to World War II, French, Portuguese and Polish tapestries of the 16th-18th centuries, Italian Baroque paintings, drawings, including by Annibale Carracci, sacred art including icons, coins, medals and a notable philatelic collection.

==== Library and Archive ====
The book collection consisted of around 15,000 volumes from the 19th and 20th centuries, relating to history, theology and travel. In addition there were 450 prints of the 16th–18th centuries of Western European and Polish origin. There were also seven Incunables pressed in the 15th century. Among the first editions were early piano compositions by Maria Szymanowska. Among the 250 or so manuscripts, were the autographs of poets and writers from 1815 to 1983, documents issued by Polish kings (up to the XVIIIc.) and Papal bulls and letters by national heroes. There was also a significant cartographic collection. The Museum and Library became a member institution of the Standing Conference of Museums, Archives and Libraries in the West. In September 2002 the Fawley Court Museum played host to the Standing Conference scholars' annual meeting.

=== St Anne's Church and Columbarium ===
The school and the museum also served for over half a century as a popular meeting place on feast days for the wider Polish community. Indeed, it became a destination for the Polish diaspora in that it led Prince Stanisław Albrecht Radziwiłł (husband of Lee Bouvier-Radziwill, younger sister of Jacqueline Kennedy Onassis) to fund the erection of St. Anne's church in the grounds and a burial place for his mother and other family members. The church in striking modernist style, reminiscent of Zakopane Style architecture, was commissioned from Polish architect, Władysław Jarosz, from the architectural practice, Crabtree and Jarosz and completed in 1971. It is Grade II listed by English Heritage. He died in 1976 and was himself interred in the church's crypt, so confident had he been of the Polish commitment to this jewel of the English countryside.

=== Sale ===
In 2008 the Polish Province of the Marian Fathers put the estate up for sale due to financial difficulties. It was purchased in 2009 by a property investor for £13m. The sale has generated a controversy within the Polish community in the UK and in the Polish media. A number of court cases have arisen from the sale. The museum and library collection have been divided between the Polish Institute and Sikorski Museum in London and several museums in Poland, with the majority of the exhibits transferred to the newly-opened Museum in Licheń Stary.

Following the sale and renovation, the estate has become a country club.

== Heritage listing ==
Fawley Court is recorded in the National Heritage List for England as a designated Grade I listed building.

St Anne's Church, in the grounds of Fawley Court is recorded in the National Heritage List for England as a Grade II listed building.

== See also ==
- The village of Fawley, Buckinghamshire
- List of non-ecclesiastical works by Paley and Austin
- Temple Island
- Chateau de Montresor (an example of integration of Polish heritage with a French historic monument)
- Basilica of Our Lady of Licheń (shrine, where parts of the Fawley Court Museum are re-located.)
