= Józef Jarzębowski =

Rev. Józef Jarzębowski MIC
- Headmaster of Divine Mercy College, Fawley Court, Buckinghamshire
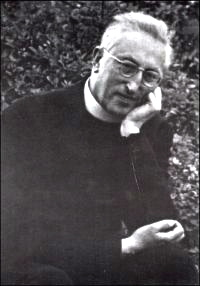
- Fr. Jarzębowski
- Church: Roman Catholic Church
- Predecessor: none
- Successor: Andrzej Janicki, ps. "Żuliński" MIC
- Previous post: Chaplain in Mexico

Orders
- Ordination: 1923

Personal details
- Born: 26 November 1897 Warsaw, Poland
- Died: 13 September 1964 (aged 66) Herisau, Switzerland

Józef Jarzębowski (b. 26 November 1897 in Warsaw - d. 13 September 1964 in Herisau, Switzerland) was a Polish-born Roman Catholic priest, member of the Marian Fathers. He was an educationalist, historian, writer and noted antiquarian.

== Life ==
Raised by his widowed mother as one of three children, Jarzębowski came from an impoverished background. He was a good scholar, but suffered from poor health. In 1917 he joined the Polish province of the Marian Fathers. After abbreviated theological and history studies at the Catholic University of Lublin, from 1925 to 1937 he was a history and humanities teacher at his order's Bielany college in Warsaw. In 1938 he published a life of his revolutionary hero, Romuald Traugutt. At the outbreak of World War II, he managed to evade the Nazi occupiers and made his way eastwards to Vilnius. There he met professor of theology, Michał Sopoćko who had been the spiritual director of a recently deceased young nun, Faustyna Kowalska (1905–1938). From him he learned about her revelations and her devotion to the Divine Mercy of Jesus. This devotion was symbolised in a painting that was commissioned by Sopoćko from his colleague at Stefan Batory University, the professor of Art, Eugeniusz Kazimirowski. Its execution was guided by Kowalska herself. Jarzębowski resolved then to become an "apostle of Divine Mercy". In 1941 he succeeded in evading the Soviet authorities and made his way into exile through Russia and Japan to the United States where he worked as a chaplain to various Polish communities. He also travelled to Mexico where he looked after displaced children and spread the message of Divine Mercy.

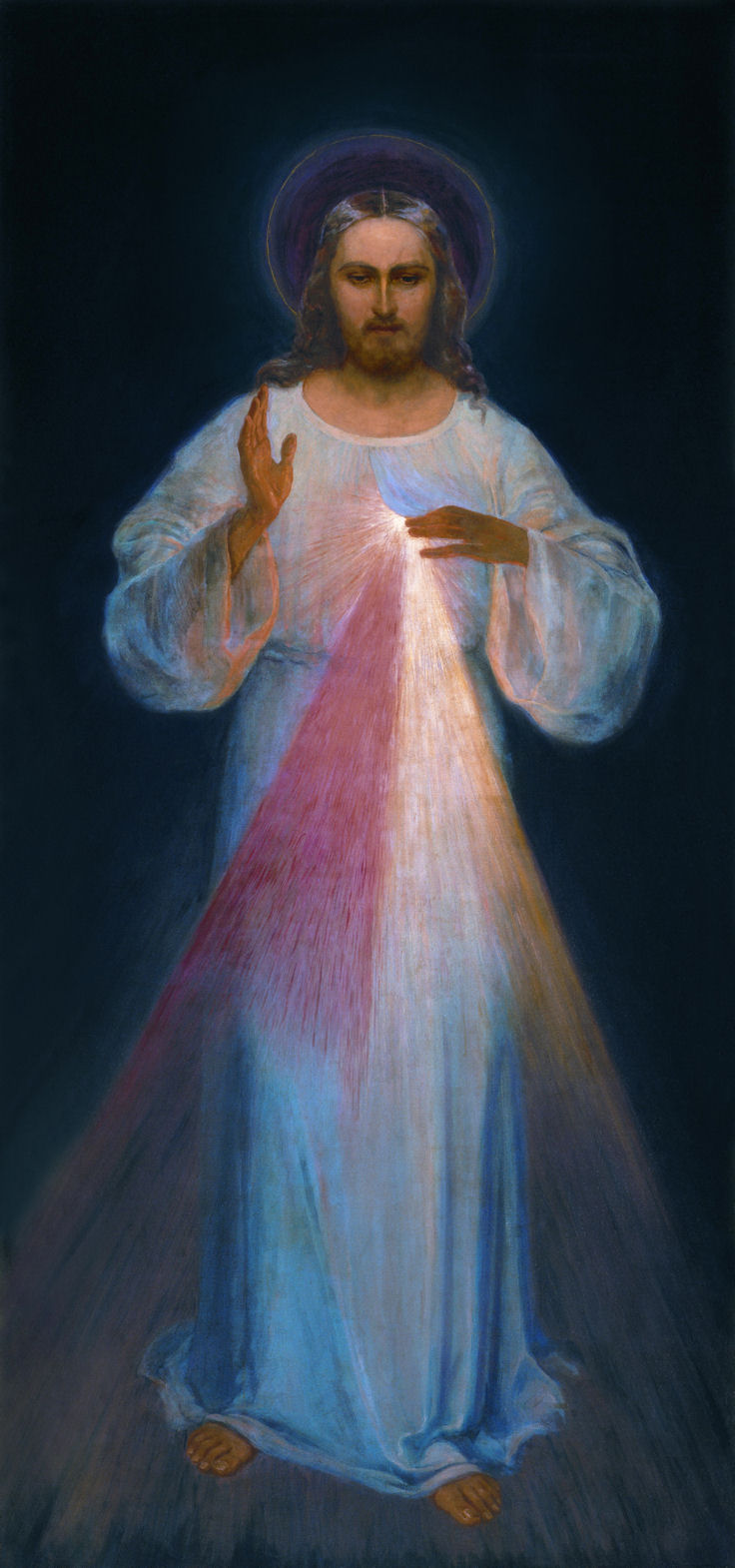
Kazimirowski's Divine Mercy, 1934

In the late 1940s Jarzębowski was summoned by his order to the United Kingdom to work with the thousands of Poles displaced there after the war and living in resettlement camps. Initially in 1950 he was a pastor and teacher at a Marian boys' school in Hereford. This was followed in 1953 by the acquisition of substantial former British Army quarters at Fawley Court, outside Henley-on-Thames where, with the financial assistance of the Polish community in the United Kingdom, he founded Divine Mercy College, a Catholic boarding school for Polish and local boys. The school lasted till 1986 after rolls had fallen substantially. Alongside the school Jarzębowski used the Grade I listed 17th-century manor house, as the home of his extensive antiquarian library and museum where valuable polonica had been assembled as well as items of wider European historical interest, to which other deposits and loans were added by Polish collectors.

Jarzębowski died in 1964 while on a religious retreat in Switzerland. His remains were brought back to Fawley Court for burial. They were exhumed in 2012 as a condition of the subsequent controversial sale by the Polish order of the Thames-side property. Józef Jarzębowski died with the opinion of sanctity and a request for his Beatification was deposited in 1993 with the Auxiliary bishop of Warsaw, Msgr. Zbigniew Józef Kraszewski. Jarzębowski's current resting place is in the Fairmile cemetery, Henley.

== Legacy ==
=== Teacher and writer ===
There were four distinct periods of teaching in Jarzębowski's life, the first and longest being that as a schoolmaster in Warsaw, 1925–1937. Shortly before the Second World War, he was given leave by his order to pursue full-time his researches into the leading figures of the Polish January Uprising. This produced a book on Traugutt and material for later publications. After his escape from war-torn Poland, he once again took up teaching in the 1940s at Santa Rosa in Mexico where he was assigned to a school for displaced and orphaned Polish children. The third phase was 1950–1952 when he taught boys from Polish resettlement camps outside Hereford in England. As the Polish population dispersed and became more integrated with its host country, while Poland was more firmly in the Soviet sphere of influence, the view among the Polish diaspora was that Polish culture should be maintained among its youth whether or not there might be an eventual return to their home country. With this in mind, it was resolved to establish a boys' secondary school - a girls boarding school had already been set up in Northamptonshire - to foster Polish traditions alongside a British curriculum. Jarzębowski found the recently abandoned and vacant dilapidated historic country house outside Henley that would combine his teacher's calling with his dream of a suitable setting for his historical and antiquarian interests. It was the fourth and final phase of his educational and writing career. It was also the place where he wished to be laid to rest. He achieved all those aims at least for the duration of his own life time.

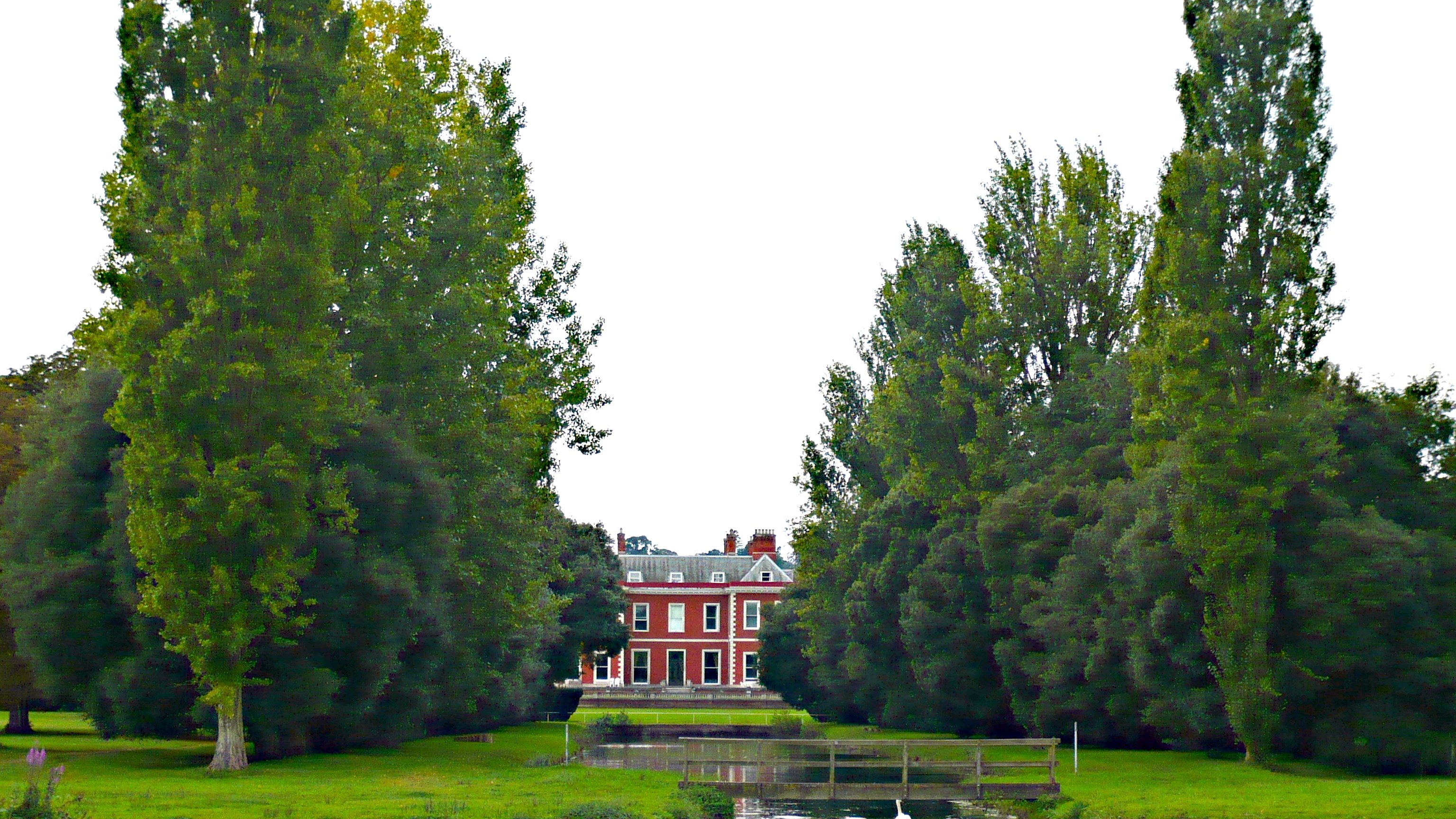
Fawley Court, glimpsed from the banks of the Thames

=== Divine Mercy College ===
In 1953 Jarzębowski became spiritual leader of the Marian community and headmaster of the educational foundation that was Divine Mercy College. It became a religious and cultural centre for Poles in the South of England and beyond, hosting large numbers of visitors on feast days, especially at Pentecost. Although the priests formed the backbone of the College staff, they were complemented by secular women and men teachers, supported by a parents' association, the broader Friends of Fawley Court and frequent visitations from high-ranking prelates. Among the alumni of the school is the writer, broadcaster and art critic, Waldemar Januszczak.

Although Jarzębowski gradually withdrew from active participation in the college, due to health problems and to concentrate on his spiritual and historical interests, the momentum he had given to the setting continued for a further 20 years after his premature death in 1964. His successor was Fr. Andrzej Janicki, a veteran of the Warsaw Uprising, historian and Sci-Fi writer. After the school closed in 1986, Fawley Court became a conference and retreat centre.

As the post-war generation of Poles disappeared, community support for the asset went into decline. The new generation of priests from the Polish province who arrived to replace the old guard were raised in communist Poland and appeared to be at sea coping with an English stately home and its management. They were seemingly unable to capitalise on the huge influx of Polish migrants to the UK after Poland's accession to the EU. Whereas the 2001 UK Census recorded 60,711 Polish-born UK residents; 60,680 of these resided in Great Britain (not including Northern Ireland) - compared with 73,951 in 1991 - following immigration after Poland's accession to the EU, the Office for National Statistics estimated 911,000 Polish-born residents in the UK in 2016, making Poles the largest overseas-born group.

The Marian order's energies and finances were anyway being strained by a massive new sanctuary project in Poland and Jarzębowski's dream for Fawley Court fell victim to other congregational priorities. The invaluable asset was put up for sale in 2009 among lasting controversy and campaigns to save it for the community.

=== Fawley Court Library and Museum ===
Jarzębowski was also an assiduous collector, since before the war, of Polish Militaria and historical materials related to the November and January Uprisings. Fawley Court housed a Museum of national significance and was the subject of a detailed study published by the National Library of Poland. The collection comprised a number of sculptures, most notably an Antonine period marble bust said to be of the juvenile Commodus, that Fr. Jarzębowski had brought back from Mexico in 1944. It had been on loan to the Ashmolean Museum (1973–1985) but after a failed attempt to sell it in 1985, it was finally sold at a Christie's auction in 2005. Also sold in 1985 was an earlier acquisition, by a previous owner of Fawley Court, John Freeman, of a fragment from the Pergamon Altar that Freeman had placed over the entrance to the Gothic folly in the Capability Brown designed grounds. The Jarzębowski collection also contained: an armoury of the 16th–19th centuries of European, Asian and Far Eastern provenance, other militaria ranging from the last Polish uprising to World War II, French, Portuguese and Polish tapestries of the 16th-18th centuries, Italian Baroque paintings, drawings, including by Annibale Carracci, sacred art including icons, coins, medals and a notable philatelic collection.

The library consisted of around 15,000 volumes from the 19th and 20th centuries, relating to history, theology and travel. There were also 450 prints of the 16th–18th centuries of Western European and Polish origin, with 7 Incunables pressed in the 15th century. Among the first editions were early piano compositions by Maria Szymanowska. Among the 250 or so manuscripts, were the autographs of poets and writers from 1815 to 1983, documents issued by Polish kings (up to the 18th-c.) and Papal bulls and letters by national heroes. There was also a significant cartographic collection. The Museum and Library had been a member of the Standing Conference of Museums, Archives and Libraries in the West.

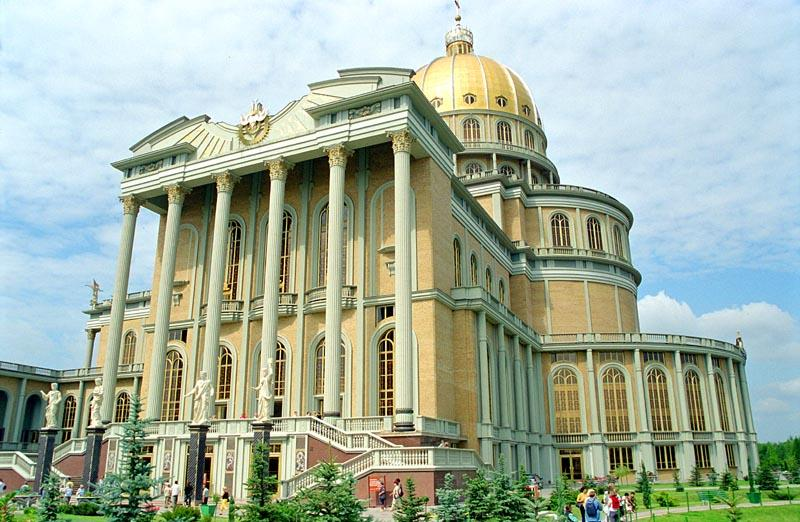
New home of the "ks. Józef Jarzębowski Museum" at Licheń Stary in Poland

In 2010 the Marian Fathers opened a "Józef Jarzębowski Museum" in his honour, as part of their new pilgrim centre at the Basilica of Our Lady of Licheń in Central Poland. It contains a selection from the earlier collections of the defunct Fawley Court museum.

== Publications in Polish ==
- Traugutt, nakładem Archidiecezjalnego Instytutu Akcji Katolickiej, Warszawa, 1938.
- Węgierska polityka Traugutta: na podstawie znanych i nieznanych dokumentów. Warszawa 1939. ("Traugutt's Hungarian policies").
- Norwid i Zmartwychstańcy. London: Veritas, 1960. ("Norwid and The Resurrectionists")
- Mówią Ludzie Roku 1863: Antologia nieznanych i małoznanych Głosów Ludzi współczesnych. London: Veritas, 1963. ("Voices from 1863: An Anthology of unknown and little known contemporary Perspectives").
- Droga Krzyżowa i Litania do zmęczonego Jezusa. Londyn: Veritas, 1963. ("The Way of the Cross and a Litany to a weary Jesus").
- Traugutt: dokumenty, listy, wspomnienia, wypisy. Londyn: Veritas, 1970.
- Pieśń bezimiennego Krzyżowca. Veritas, 1970. ("Hymn of an anonymous Follower of the Cross")
- Jan Jeziorański: Zapomniany Bohater 1863 roku. Londyn: Veritas, 1974. ("Jezioranski: A forgotten Hero of 1863").
- Dziennik 1923–1937. Red. Bukowicz, Jan., Górski, Tadeusz. wyd. Księży Marianów, 1999. (Edited "1923–1937 Diaries").
- Listy z czasu Wojny. Red. Bukowicz, Jan., Górski, Tadeusz. wyd. Księży Marianów, 1999. (Edited "Correspondence from the time of war").
- Rekolekcje Magnifikatu. Warszawa: Puszcza Mariańska, Mariański Instytut Historyczny, 2004. ("A Retreat on the Magnificat").

== Bibliography ==
- Danilewicz-Zielińska, Maria, Paszkowski, Mieczysław, Smoleńska, Hanna, Starzycka, Halina. Katalog wystawy historycznej w stuleciu Powstania Styczniowego: Zbiory ks. Józefa Jarzębowskiego. Londyn, wyd. Towarzystwo Przyjaciół Fawley Court. 1964 - "Catalogue of the historical exhibition on the hundredth anniversary of the January Uprising: The Collection of Rev. Józef Jarzębowski". London, published by the Friends of Fawley Court, 1964, with a summary in English.
- Kraszewski, Zbigniew. Miłosierdzie Boże ratunkiem dla świata: ks. Józef Jarzębowski Marianin Apostoł Miłosierdzia Bożego. Warszawa, 1984 - "Divine Mercy Salvation of the World: Rev. Józef Jarzębowski, Marian Father, Apostle of Divine Mercy". Published in Warsaw, 1984.

== See also ==
- Poles in the United Kingdom
