= Chivalry and Betrayal: The Hundred Years' War =

2013 British documentary TV series

- Genre: Documentary
- Written by: Janina Ramirez
- Directed by: Graham Johnston
- Presented by: Janina Ramirez
- Country of origin: United Kingdom
- Original language: English
- No. of episodes: 3

Production
- Executive producer: Clare Sillery
- Producer: Graham Johnston
- Cinematography: Steve Moss; Craig Loveridge
- Running time: 60 minutes
- Production company: BBC

Original release
- Network: BBC Four
- Release: 11 February – 25 February 2013

Chivalry and Betrayal: The Hundred Years' War is a 2013 documentary television series written and presented by cultural historian Dr. Janina Ramirez looking at a time when the ruling classes of England and France were bound together by shared sets of values, codes of behaviour and language for three hundred years that ended with the Hundred Years' War when chivalry ended with the devastating warfare of cannon and betrayal between rulers when England lost her French possessions. It was originally broadcast by the BBC in February 2013.

== Production notes ==
Locations visited during filming include Crécy, Poitiers, Agincourt, Mont Saint Michel, Carcassonne, Saint Denis, Tower of London, Gloucester Cathedral, St. Gregory’s with St. Peter’s Church in Sudbury, Suffolk, The National Archives (United Kingdom) and the National Library of Wales.

== Episodes ==
=== Episode 1: "Trouble in the Family 1337–1360" ===
Edward III of England believed he had a right to the Kingdom of France and not as a vassal of his cousin Philip VI. Philip confiscated the English lands in France and Edward takes an army and lands in Normandy sacking Caen. Philip gathers an even larger force and follows Edward to Crécy and in the ensuing battle the low-born archers of England defeated the knights and noblemen of France. Edward creates the Order of the Garter and the cross of Saint George to create an English identity.

Philip died and his son John II succeeded and created the chivalric Order of the Star but before hostilities could recommence the Black Death arrived in Europe and would kill half the population. An uneasy truce lasted five years before Edwards son, Edward, the Black Prince would lead a chevauchée from Aquitaine culminating in the Battle of Poitiers where the knights of the Order of the Star, bound by their chivalric code, were decimated and King John was captured and taken to England for ransom. The Treaty of Brétigny was signed ceding nearly a third of France to Edward.

=== Episode 2: "Breaking the Bonds 1360–1415" ===
England became rich through ransom and plunder of nobles land. English freebooters led by knights ravaged the countryside in the absence of the captured French king. When John died in 1364, his eldest son Charles V was determined to expel the English. Charles declared the Treaty of Brétigny void and appointed Bertrand du Guesclin, knowing he would forgo any chivalric tradition to conduct a guerrilla war. Charles also gained control of the English Channel and attacked defenseless towns along the south coast of England.

In the aftermath of The Black Death, Charles stabilised France and took advantage of the ageing Edward. When Edward died in 1377, his ten-year old grandson, Richard II, became king with John of Gaunt as regent. Unrest and mismanagement led to the English Peasants' Revolt, which according to Ramirez was a turning point in English history.

When Charles VI of France came to power only Calais and a small part of Bordeaux remained English. In 1389, 22-year-old, Richard II took full control from John of Gaunt and concludes a truce with Charles VI. By the end of the 14th century in England, English supplanted French in official documents, the Bible had been translated and English Perpendicular Gothic had replaced Norman Gothic architecture.

Richard had become increasingly unpopular and when on the death of John of Gaunt he seized his land, John of Gaunt's exiled son Henry returned with an army, deposed Richard and became Henry IV of England. His 14-year reign was beset by plots. To unite the country, his heir, Henry V, resumed the war with France, now led by a king who was insane. In 1415 he landed at Harfleur, which fell after a long siege weakening the English army. Against advice Henry led his army on a chevauchée to English held Calais but was intercepted by a far larger French army at Agincourt and at the ensuing battle Henry's archers killed the cream of French nobility.

=== Episode 3: "Agents of God 1415–1453" ===
At Agincourt Henry V, the son of a usurper, had proved his right to be King and he was determined to regain Normandy and recreate the Duchy and landed in Normandy taking Caen, the burial place of William the Conqueror, and in 11 months had nearly half of Normandy which he divided amongst his brothers, leading commanders and houses to London merchants.

France led by the mad Charles VI was in turmoil with two royal factions, the Orleanists led by the mad King's son and the Burgundians led by the Duke of Burgundy John the Fearless, fighting each other. John was an ally of Henry and did nothing as Henry completed the conquest of Normandy but when Henry turned his attention to the rest of France, John entered into peace treaty talks with the Orleanists who promptly murdered him. John's son Philip the Good allied himself with Henry and at the Treaty of Troyes Charles VI son was disinherited in favour of Henry and Henry was made regent, sealed by the marriage of Henry to Charles VI daughter Catherine of Valois.

The treaty meant nothing to the Orleanists and Charles' VI son, The Dauphin who still resisted as Henry entered Paris in September 1420, an occupation by the English that would last 15 years. Henry continued the war against the French and in 1422 died never having become King of France as Charles VI outlived him by seven weeks. Henry's heir to the two thrones was his nine-month-old son Henry VI and Henry's brothers would act as Regents. John, Duke of Bedford became Regent of France and continued the war and maintained the peace with the Burgundians.

The Dauphin, desperate for a victory discovered the 17-year-old peasant girl, Joan of Arc, sent by God to rid France of the English and using her to head and inspire an army defeat the English at Orleans. Inspired by the God sent Joan the French made inroads into English territory and the Dauphin was crowned Charles VII of France at Reims. Joan of Arc was captured by the Burgundians and sold to the English and John, Duke of Bedford executed her for heresy and witchcraft to discredited Charles VII claim to the throne. He brought ten-year-old Henry VI to be crowned in Paris in 1431.

In 1435 Bedford died and sworn enemies Charles VII and Phillip, Duke of Burgundy joined forces to get the English out and with Henry VI reluctance to wage war and to maintain peace by marrying Margaret of Anjou. Charles had no intention of peace and used cannon and sieges to retake France and Normandy culminating in the defeat of the English at the Battle of Castillon in the last English territory of Gascony ending the hundred years war.

== Reception ==
The first episode gained 589,000 viewers, the second 814,000 and the third 768,000.

Writing a blog for The Independent, Sam Gould praised the series for devoting time to the reign of Edward III and said that he looked forward to the third episode. He said Ramirez's "take on the war integrates cultural, political and military history wonderfully well and uses period artefacts and settings to stunning effect" and that "thankfully, it's more than just a bunch of historians talking about heraldry".
