= Roman Żuliński =

Polish mathematician (1837-1864)

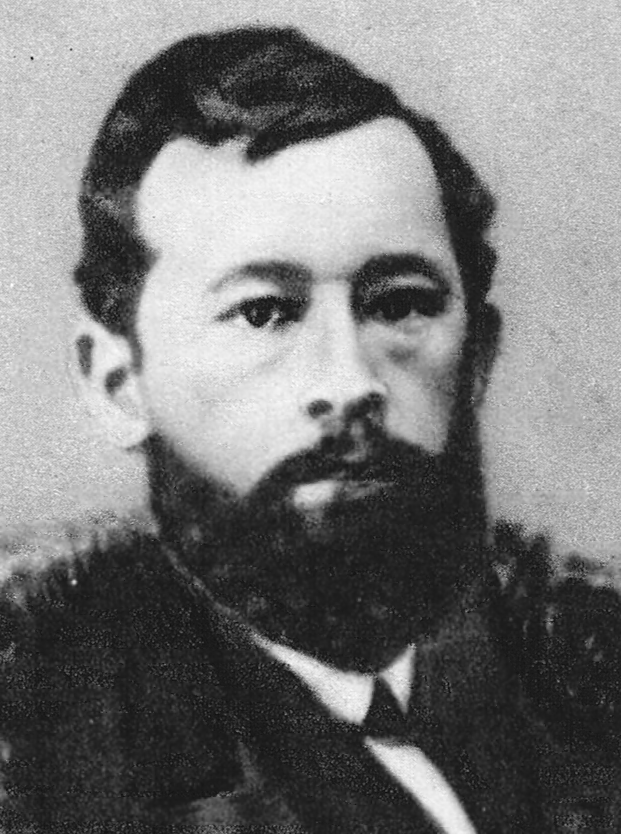

Roman Żuliński (28 January 1837 – 5 August 1864) - a Polish mathematician and co-commander of the January Uprising.

After the uprising he was sentenced to death and hanged near the Warsaw Citadel on 5 August 1864, together with other rebel commanders, including Romuald Traugutt.
