= Romuald Traugutt =

Polish general, leader of the January Uprising

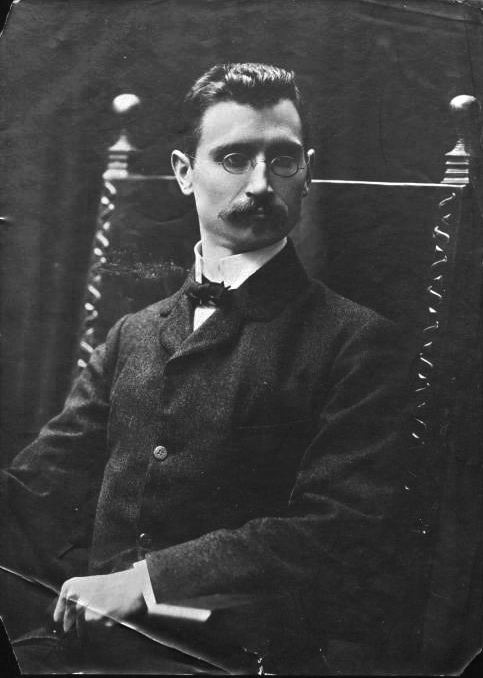

Dictator of the Polish National Government
- In office 17 October 1863 – 20 April 1864
- Preceded by: Franciszek Dobrowolski
- Succeeded by: Position abolished

Personal details
- Born: 16 January 1826 Szostakowo, Grodno Governorate, Russian Empire (now Shastakova, Belarus)
- Died: 5 August 1864 (aged 38) Warsaw, Congress Poland, Russian Empire (now Poland)

Military service
- Allegiance: Russian Empire; Polish National Government
- Years of service: 1842–1862; 1863–1864
- Rank: Lieutenant colonel (Russian Empire); General (Polish National Government)
- Battles/wars: Hungarian Revolution of 1848; Crimean War; January Uprising

Romuald Traugutt (Polish: [rɔˈmu.alt ˈtraw.ɡut]; 16 January 1826 – 5 August 1864) was a Polish military officer and politician who served as the last dictator of the January Uprising.

Following a career in the Imperial Russian Army that included service in Hungary and Crimea, Traugutt reluctantly joined the uprising against the Russian Empire in March 1863, eventually rising to the position of the last leader of the ill-fated insurrection.

Following capture by the Imperial Russian Police, he was tried and executed for his role in the Uprising. Despite the failure of the uprising, Traugutt became a Polish national hero. Following the return of Poland as a sovereign national entity he was recognized for his service, after decades of being censored by Imperial Russian authorities.

== Early life ==
Traugutt was born on the Szostakowo, estate Grodno Governorate in the Russian Empire. Son of Ludwik and Alojza (nee Błocka). Following his mother's death when Traugutt was two, he was raised by his grandmother Justyna Błocka. Following his graduation from the Svislach Gymnasium in 1842, Traugutt joined the army. According to some sources, prior to joining the Russian army Traugutt unsuccessfully attempted to gain admission to the Institute of Railway Engineers (Note: In some sources appears as the Institute of Road Engineers (pol. Instytut Inżynierów Dróg Komunikacyjnych) – [1] [2] [3]) in St. Petersburg.

== Military service ==
Following his graduation from the sapper school in Żelichów with the rank of chorąży, he worked as an instructor before being deployed in Hungary. Serving under Ivan Paskevich, he took part in the Russian intervention in the Hungarian Revolution of 1848, earning a promotion to the rank of lieutenant. While serving in Hungary, Traugutt's father Ludwik died.

He married his first wife Anna Emilia Pikiel, daughter of a Warsaw jeweler on 25 July 1852. Prior to the wedding his soon-to-be wife, a Lutheran, converted to Catholicism. The couple lived in Żelechów. During that time Traugutt's military service was rewarded with a house, military pension and the Order of St. Catherine, 2nd Class.

After the outbreak of the Crimean War, in December 1853, Traugutt and his troops were sent to the peninsula. They arrived in April of the following year, where Traugutt took part in the defensive efforts during the Siege of Sevastopol. After the war he and his family relocated first to Odesa then to Kharkiv. There he suffered a mental breakdown following the successive deaths of his family members: his grandmother (November 1859), infant daughter Justyna (December 1859), wife Anna (January 1860) and son Konrad (May 1860). Following his recovery, Traugutt took over the estates of his recently deceased godfather.

In 1860 Traugutt became acquainted with Antonina Kościuszkówna, a relative of Tadeusz Kościuszko. After a brief engagement the couple was wed on 13 June 1860. At the time, he was considering retirement from the army – he was in poor physical condition and rumors of an uprising were already circulating. Traugutt was eventually discharged from the army on 14 June 1862, with the rank of lieutenant colonel, while retaining the right to wear the uniform and earning a pension of 230 rubles. Around that time his two-year-old son Roman died.

== January Uprising ==
While the January Uprising broke out in January 1863, Traugutt remained reluctant to take part in the insurrection until April 1863. Traugutt participated in a few skirmishes, before his unit was destroyed in Battle of Kołodno in July 1863. Routed, he hid in Eliza Orzeszkowa's estate before making his way to Warsaw. There he presented himself to the National Government and was granted the title of General on 15 August.

Traugutt embarked on a diplomatic mission to France, hoping to garner support for the Uprising. Following the mission's failure, he returned to Poland and earned the support of the White faction. After the Reds lost power, Traugutt was selected as the dictator of the uprising on 17 October 1863.

Traugutt's leadership was secret in nature. Adopting the nom de guerre Michał Czarnecki, he led the uprising from his apartment at Smolna Street 3 and pretended to be a merchant from Galicia to further obscure his identity. As dictator, Traugutt attempted to reform guerrilla units into a professional army and – on 23 December 1863 – summoned representatives from Congress Poland to discuss the abolition of serfdom.

Recognizing the difficult financial situation of the uprising, Traugutt attempted to take loans from domestic and foreign banks, with no success. After failing to garner foreign states' support for a military intervention, he turned to revolutionaries, such as Giuseppe Garibaldi, for help.

Despite his noted religious devotion and correspondence with Pope Pious IX, Traugutt blocked sending funds to Rome, meant for the beatification of Josaphat Kuntsevych.

== Arrest and execution ==
After the failure of the uprising, Traugutt's real identity was revealed by Artur Goldman, a participant of the uprising arrested by the Russian police earlier in the month in Helena Kirkorowa's apartment on the night of 10–11 April 1864.

On 19 July he was sentenced to death for his role in the uprising. Traugutt was hanged at the Warsaw Citadel on 5 August 1864, alongside rebel commanders Rafał Krajewski, Józef Toczyski, Roman Żuliński and Jan Jeziorański.

== Commemoration ==
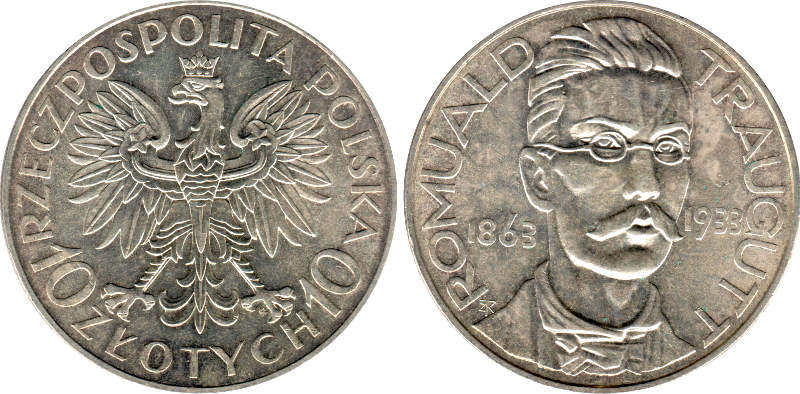
Romuald Traugutt on the 10 złoty coin (1933)

Following Traugutt's execution a cult of personality began forming around his person, with some sources likening his sacrifice to the martyrdom of Christ.

In 1916, a monument was raised in Warsaw at the site of his execution, and in 1925, the area around it was dedicated as Traugutt Park.

In 1945, he was honored on the first postage stamp of the newly re-emerged Republic of Poland as part of a three-stamp set honoring national heroes. He had been earlier honored on a stamp in the 1938 set for the 20th anniversary of Poland's independence after World War I. Poland issued additional stamps in his honor in 1962 and 1963. He was also commemorated on the Polish 20 złoty banknote of the 1980s.

The high school in Częstochowa is named after him, and a memorial column to him was erected in 1933 in Ciechocinek.

There is also a monument to Traugutt in the town of Svislach in Belarus.

One of Traugutt's early biographers has been the Marian Father, Józef Jarzębowski (1897-1964), who devoted three volumes to Traugutt's life and work. Other biographers include his great-grandson, col. Andrzej Juszkiewicz (1923-2009).

== Bibliography ==
- Józef Jarzębowski. Traugutt, nakładem Archidiecezjalnego Instytutu Akcji Katolickiej, Warszawa, 1938.
- Józef Jarzębowski. Węgierska polityka Traugutta: na podstawie znanych i nieznanych dokumentów. Warszawa 1939. ("Traugutt's Hungarian policies").
- Józef Jarzębowski. Traugutt: dokumenty, listy, wspomnienia, wypisy. Londyn: Veritas, 1970.
