= Janina Ramirez =

British art and cultural historian

Janina Ramirez FRHistS FRSA
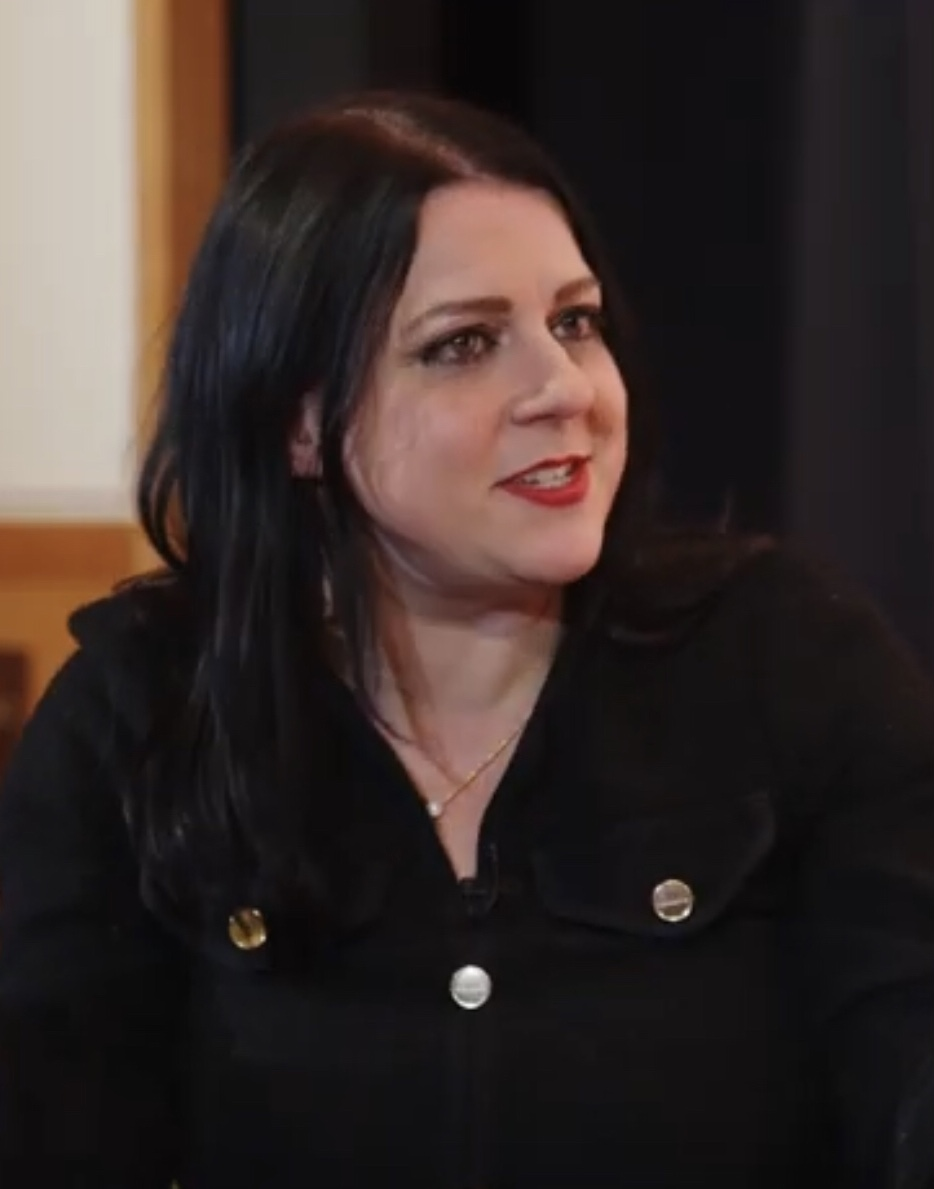
- Ramirez at the British Library in 2024
- Born: Janina Sara Maria Maleczek; 7 July 1980 (age 46); Dubai, United Arab Emirates
- Occupations: Lecturer; Art historian; Television presenter; Researcher
- Children: 2

Academic background
- Education: St Anne's College, Oxford; University of York
- Thesis: The symbolic life of birds in Anglo-Saxon England (2006)
- Doctoral advisor: Jane Hawkes; Mary Garrison

Academic work
- Discipline: History
- Sub-discipline: Art history; Cultural history; Architectural history; Women's history; Middle Ages
- Institutions: University of York; University of Winchester; University of Warwick; Oxford University Department for Continuing Education; Harris Manchester College, Oxford
- Website: www.janinaramirez.co.uk

Janina Sara Maria Ramirez FRHistS FRSA (pronounced [ja'nina]; née Maleczek; born 7 July 1980), sometimes credited as Nina Ramirez, is a British art historian, cultural historian, and TV presenter. She specialises in interpreting symbols and examining works of art within their historical context.

== Education and academic career ==
Ramirez went to St Bernard's Catholic Grammar School in Slough, Berkshire, where she was head girl. She gained a degree in English literature, specialising in Old and Middle English, from St Anne's College, Oxford, before completing her postgraduate studies at the Centre for Medieval Studies, University of York. She earned a PhD degree on "The symbolic life of birds in Anglo-Saxon England", which led to a lectureship in York's Art History Department, followed by lecturing posts at the University of Winchester, the University of Warwick, and the University of Oxford.

Until 2021, Ramirez was the course director on the Certificate in History of Art at the University of Oxford Department for Continuing Education. In 2021, Ramirez became Research Fellow in History of Art at Harris Manchester College, Oxford.

In January 2024, Ramirez became a Visiting Professor of Medieval Studies at the University of Lincoln.

== Personal life ==
Her grandfather was Polish. Ramirez and her Spanish husband have two children. At 14, she played bass in a band with Krissi Murison as lead singer. Ramirez was in a punk band, The Role Models, while at Oxford but chose finishing her degree over touring with the band.

== Television career ==
- Treasures of the Anglo-Saxons, BBC Four, August 2010
- The Viking Sagas, BBC Four, May 2011
- Britain's Most Fragile Treasure, BBC Four, October 2011
- Illuminations: The Private Lives of Medieval Kings, 3-part series, BBC Four, January 2012
- Chivalry and Betrayal: The Hundred Years' War, 3-part series, BBC Four, February 2013
- Architects of the Divine: The First Gothic Age, BBC Four, October 2014
- Saints and Sinners: Britain's Millennium of Monasteries, 3-part series, BBC Four, February 2015
- The Quizeum, A museum-based quiz panel show, BBC Four, April 2015
- The Search for the Lost Manuscript: Julian of Norwich, BBC Four, July 2016
- The Olmec Heads, SBS ONE HD, 2019
- An Art Lover's Guide, BBC Four, May 2017
- In Search of Arcadia, BBC Four, August 2017
- England's Reformation: Three Books that Changed a Nation, BBC Four, October 2017
- Art on BBC: The Genius of Leonardo Da Vinci, BBC Four, May 2018
- Raiders of the Lost Past with Janina Ramirez, BBC Four, September 2019 – 1 The Sutton Hoo Hoard (broadcast 4 September 2019)
- Handmade in Bolton – presenter, featuring Shaun Greenhalgh and narrated by Waldemar Januszczak, BBC Four, October 2019
- Lost Worlds and Hidden Treasures, 3-part series, Apple TV, May 2021

== Publications ==
- —— (2015). The Private Lives of the Saints: Power, Passion and Politics in Anglo-Saxon England. London: WH Allen. ISBN 978-0-7535-5560-6.
- —— (2016). Julian of Norwich: A Very Brief History. London: SPCK. ISBN 978-0-281-07737-3.
- —— (2018). Riddle of the Runes (A Viking Mystery). Oxford: OUP. ISBN 978-0-19-276633-5.
- —— (2019). Way of the Waves (A Viking Mystery). Oxford: OUP. ISBN 978-0-19-276635-9.
- —— (2019). Beowulf. illus. Martyn Pick. London: Ladybird Books. ISBN 978-0-7181-8973-0.
- —— (2022). Goddess: 50 Goddesses, Spirits, Saints and Other Female Figures Who Have Shaped Belief. London: Nosy Crow. ISBN 978-1-78800-995-9.
- —— (2022). Femina: A New History of the Middle Ages, Through the Women Written Out of It. London: Penguin Random House. ISBN 978-0-7535-5825-6.
- —— (2025). Legenda: The Real Women Behind the Myths That Shaped Europe. London: Penguin Random House. ISBN 978-0-7535-6042-6.
