= The Dark Ages: An Age of Light =

2012 British documentary television series

- Genre: Documentary
- Written by: Waldemar Januszczak
- Directed by: Waldemar Januszczak
- Presented by: Waldemar Januszczak
- Composers: Simon Russell; Peter Mayne
- Country of origin: United Kingdom
- Original language: English
- No. of series: 1
- No. of episodes: 4

Production
- Executive producers: Mark Bell (BBC); Peter Grimsdale
- Producer: Lidia Ciszewska
- Cinematography: Owen Scurfield; Ian Serfontein; Matt Conway
- Running time: 57–60 minutes
- Production company: ZCZ films

Original release
- Network: BBC
- Release: 27 November – 18 December 2012

The Dark Ages: An Age of Light is a four-part documentary television series written, directed, and presented by the British art critic Waldemar Januszczak looking at the art and architecture of the so-called Dark Ages (i.e. Early Middle Ages) that shows it to be an era with advancements contrary to popular perceptions of the period. It was broadcast by the BBC in November and December 2012.

== Episode one: "The Clash of the Gods" ==
Januszczak shows how Christianity emerged into the Roman Empire as an artistic force in the third and fourth centuries. Early Christians had no art. They were an illegal secret cult, and practised in very small groups. Januszczak asserts that Rotas Squares, found throughout the Roman Empire including Pompeii, were early Christian symbols along with the fish and the anchor. When the Edict of Milan made Christianity legal, Christian art began appearing. With no description of Jesus in the Bible, the earliest images of Christ were blond, curly-haired, young, and beardless, an appearance Januszczak says was borrowed from Apollo, the pagan god of the sun, who was usually depicted with a halo. Januszczak tells us that the Vatican has galleries filled with these "cheerful initial Christs, armed with their Harry Potter wands, which they wave busily as they perform a succession of helpful miracles." Images of angels were copied from those of Nike. With the emergence of Saint Mary and the adoption of Christianity by the emperor Constantine, artists drew upon other pagan artwork for inspiration, and more heroic and powerful images of Jesus emerged. They also embraced the development of new forms of architecture to contain and display their art.

Viewing figures: 661,000

== Episode two: "What the Barbarians Did for Us" ==
The "Barbarians" are often blamed for the collapse of the Roman Empire, but in reality they were fascinating civilisations that produced magnificent art. Focusing on the often already Christian Huns, Vandals and Goths, Januszczak follows each tribe's journey across Europe to settle in new lands and discovers the incredible art they produced along the way.

Viewing figures: 697,000

== Episode three: "The Wonder of Islam" ==
Along with Christianity, the Dark Ages saw the emergence of another religion — Islam. After emerging in the Near East, it spread across North Africa and into Europe in such a short time that there was originally no art. In more settled times, highly decorated mosques began to be built based on the prophet Mohammad's own home. Their architectural and scientific achievements, including the mapping of the stars, dwarfed anything existing in the western world. Januszczak visits the Dome of the Rock, desert palaces forgotten by modern Islam with their more sensual artwork, the Mosque of Ibn Tulun where it was believed Noah's Ark landed, and the Mosque of Cordoba. He identifies the Nilometer used to measure the flood of the Nile and uses an astrolabe that Muslims used to find the direction of Mecca.

== Episode four: "The Men of the North" ==
This episode concentrates on the Vikings and their inventive craftsmanship, the expansive Carolingians' art of exquisite finesse and richness and the skillful hardworking ingenious Anglo-Saxons. Januszczak shows the Viking skill in making ships and their attacks on Christian centres such as Lindisfarne not only to loot but to defend their own Norse gods. He visits the Jelling stones that commemorated the Danes' conversion to Christianity. Charles Martel and the Franks belief they were God's chosen people after the defeat of Muslim forces later led to Charlemagne being declared Holy Roman Emperor by the Pope and the creation of the largest empire since the Romans. Januszczak considers Charlemagne's Palatine Chapel, Aachen, as a brutal and cold attempt to copy the Muslim Mosque of Cordoba. Anglo-Saxon art is represented by the Sutton Hoo hoard. Januszczak concludes that in the Dark Ages it was not the sword but the written word, whether in wood, stone, or what he considers the greatest masterpiece of all art, the Lindisfarne Gospels, that defined the age.

Viewing figures: n/a

== Reception ==
In her blog for the Times Literary Supplement, Cambridge classics professor Mary Beard disputed the idea (mentioned in episode one) that Christians were present at Pompeii.

Larry Hurtado, Emeritus Professor of New Testament Language, Literature & Theology at the University of Edinburgh's School of Divinity, in his personal blog criticized the idea that the early Christians were a secretive movement, and pointed out misunderstandings evident in the explanations given by Janusczak for the manner of portrayal of Jesus Christ in early Christian art.
