= Horki, Brest region =

Coordinates: 52.2731°N 23.9717°E

Horki (Belarusian: Горкі, Russian: Горки Gorki, Polish: Górki) is a village in Zhabinka District, Brest Region, Belarus.
