= Divine Mercy College =

School in Buckinghamshire, England

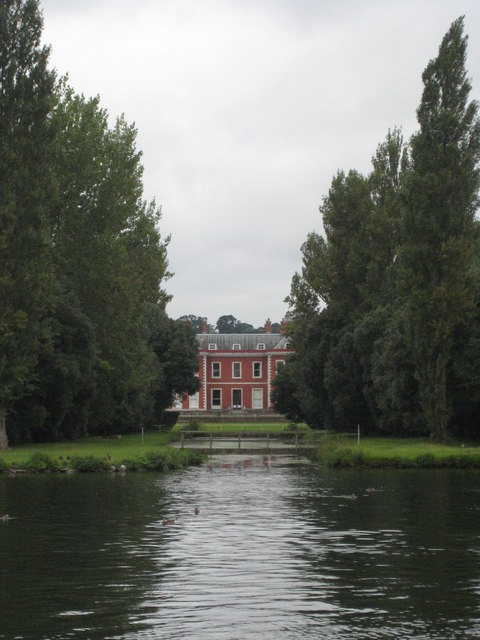
Fawley Court, former Divine Mercy College, viewed from the River Thames

Divine Mercy College is a former Roman Catholic independent secondary boarding school for boys in the English county of Buckinghamshire. It was co-founded in 1953 by rev. Józef Jarzębowski of the Marian Fathers with lay members of the Polish community in Great Britain with the intention of providing an education that combined a British curriculum with Polish language, culture and history for the children of Polish displaced persons resettled in the United Kingdom. A Charitable foundation was formed to purchase, with a mortgage, the Grade I listed 17th-century country house with out-buildings and a park designed by Capability Brown on the banks of the River Thames. The property had been used by the British Army during the Second World War and had been vacated since.

The school was housed in purpose-built blocks in the grounds of Fawley Court, just outside Henley-on-Thames. The main house in neoclassical style, sometimes attributed to Christopher Wren, with interiors by James Wyatt was used for the library, a museum, the chapel and refectory and kitchens with administrative offices on the upper floors. The teaching staff consisted of lay women and men - some of them university teachers from pre-war Poland - and the small community of exiled Polish Marian fathers headed initially by Jarzębowski (1897-1964), also a writer, historian and Antiquarian. The name of the school was inspired by its first headmaster's devotion to the Divine Mercy of Jesus.

Although pupils were mainly of Polish descent, there were others who were from British families or the sons of foreign diplomats. Pupils sat British public examinations and a number went on to universities in England or abroad. After the early death of Jarzębowski, the following rector was a war veteran and writer, fr. Andrzej Janicki MIC. Over the years the school and its attractive setting had become a popular destination for the Polish community in Southern England, especially on religious feast days.

With the general fall in school rolls during the mid-1980s, Divine Mercy College did not escape the decline and was obliged to finally close its doors to pupils in 1986. The college became a conference and retreat centre for the next 20 years or so. The property was sold after a unilateral decision by the Marian Fathers in 2010 despite controversy, lawsuits and an extended campaign to save the Grade I listed asset and its valuable museum collection for the newly greatly expanding Polish community in the UK, following Poland's accession to the European Union.

== See also ==
- Holy Family of Nazareth Convent School
- Polish Catholic Mission
