= Voluspa Jarpa =

Chilean visual artist

Voluspa Jarpa Saldías
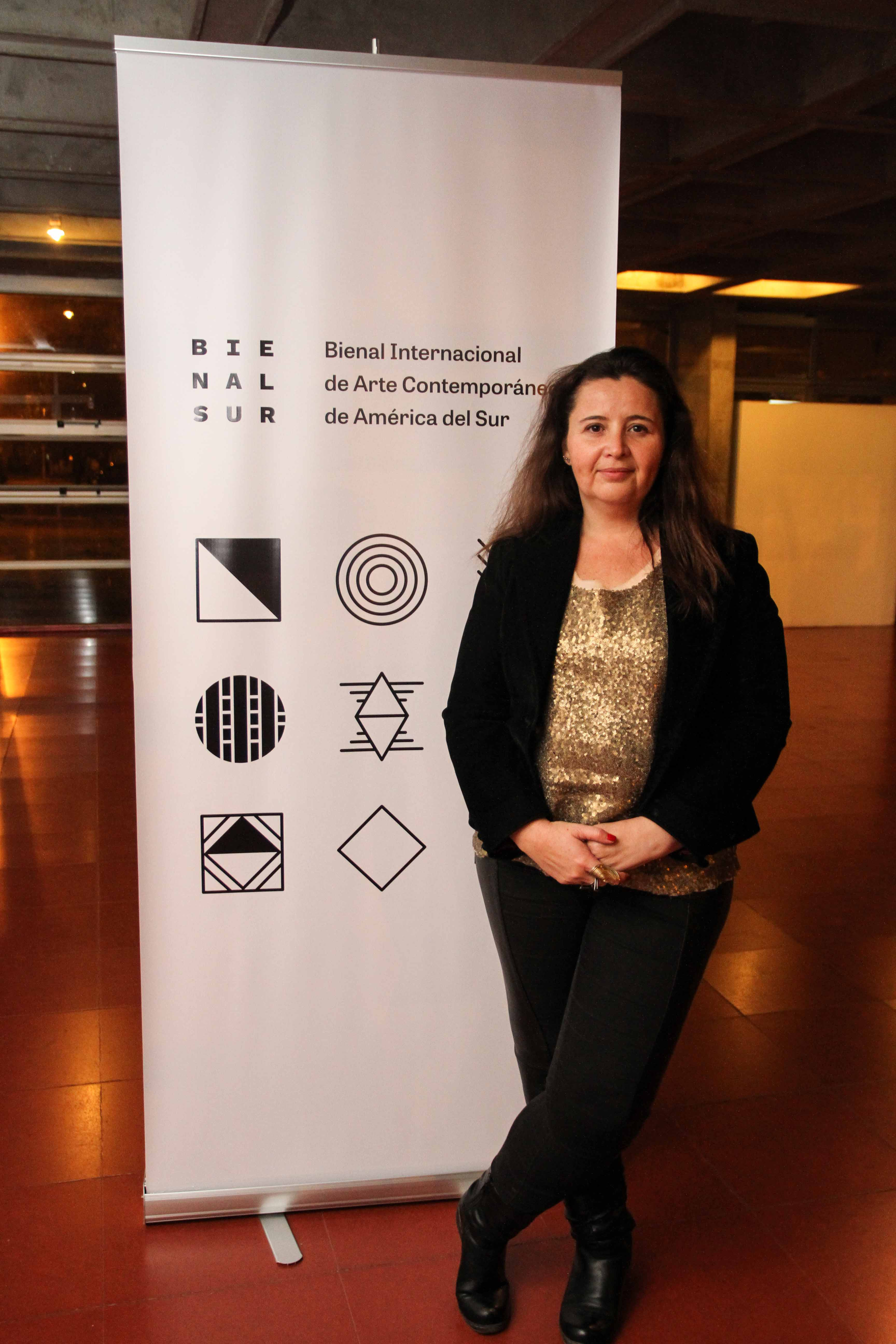
- Born: 1971 (age 54–55); Rancagua, Chile
- Known for: Painting, installations, sculpture
- Notable work: Plague (2008), Project Dislocation
- Awards: Circle of Critics of Art of Chile Award (2008), Altazor Award nomination (2011)

Voluspa Jarpa Saldías (Rancagua, 1971) is a Chilean painter and visual artist of the 1990s who has been involved in painting, installations, and sculpture.

She studied for a degree in art at the University of Chile. Her work is characterized by urban and reflexive subjects "both on the problem of dynamic displacement of the city, insecurity, abandonment and destruction, and the means of representation of the pictorial image with all the facilities and difficulties that the modern artist must take into account when creating the work." In addition she has incorporated digital technology as a representational tool in her work.

In 2008, she won an award from the Circle of Critics of Art of Chile for the exhibition Plague (2008) in the visual arts category. In 2011, she received a nomination for the Altazor Award in the media arts category for Project Dislocación. Library of the No - History of Chile.

She participated in several individual and collective exhibitions during her career, among them the 5th Havana Biennial (1997), the 3rd Biennial of the Mercosur in Carry Cheerful (2001), Without Fear Neither Hope in the Regional Museum of Ancud (2004), Residence in the Valley in the Museum of Visual arts of Santiago (2005), the exhibitions Painting Mural/The Place of Rancagua, Young Art in Chile 1986 - 1996 and Chile Austria in the National Museum of Fine arts of Chile (1994, 1997 and 2000 respectively), Paris-Santiago, The Genius of the Bastilla in the Museum of Contemporary Art of Santiago (1999), among other exhibitions in Chile, Latin America, Canada, United States and Europe.
