= Jamie Shovlin =

British artist

Jamie Shovlin (born 1978) is a British conceptual artist.

He staged his first exhibition in 2004, at Riflemaker in London, basing it on what he claimed were the drawings of a disappeared schoolgirl called Naomi V. Jelish. He supported this claim with newspaper cuttings and diaries, and the work was bought for £25,000 by Charles Saatchi. Saatchi only realised the work was a hoax halfway through the exhibition when he noticed that the girl's name, and that of her teacher John Ivesmail, were both anagrams of Jamie Shovlin. It is occasionally suggested that Saatchi bought the work believing that Jelish was real. Asked about this, Shovlin replied "He fully knew what was going on. But the more I think about it, the more it adds another layer to the piece." Commenting on the exhibition, Jamie said "I wouldn't call it a hoax. It's misdirection rather than tricking people. As an archetype of somebody from a difficult family, somebody like Anne Frank who did something normal in abnormal times, she has, I am sure, existed."

In 2006 Shovlin created another exhibition based on the memorabilia of the fictional German glam rock band "Lustfaust". This hoax was again supported with a network of websites Shovlin had created and prompted the cultural critic Waldemar Januszczak to tell his readers how the band had "cocked a notorious snook at the music industry in the late 1970s by giving away their music on blank cassettes and getting their fans to design their own covers." The collection (once exposed) was runner-up for the Beck's Futures prize. In September 2007 Lustfaust, together with Schneider T.M., gave a concert to help celebrate the opening of the new Berlin exhibition space for Haunch of Venison.

Shovlin claims that the main function of his hoaxes was not simply to fool the audience, but rather to let them gradually realise that they were being tricked, and encourage them to question their preconceptions. To this end he included clues in the exhibitions, such as notes describing Lustfaust as steering "dangerously close to Spinal Tap-isms".

A 2006 project by Shovlin was an archive of letters and writings titled Mike Harte - Make Art. This piece consisted of an ongoing mail correspondence during 2001 from the Mike Harte, a long-time friend and collaborator of Shovlin.

Shovlin's work can be found in the following collections, Charles Saatchi (Naomi V Jelish Project), Elspeth & Imogen Turner Collection (Lustfaust Memorabilia Collection, The Black Room Installation, The Ties That Bind Installation, Fontana Modern Masters and others), David Roberts (Fontana Modern Masters). Shovlin is represented by Haunch Of Venison (London, Berlin, Zurich, New York City), Unosunove Gallery (Rome), Horton Gallery (New York City) and Cosmic Galerie (Paris).
