= Royal Spring, Warsaw =

Royal Spring in Warsaw
- Zdrój Królewski
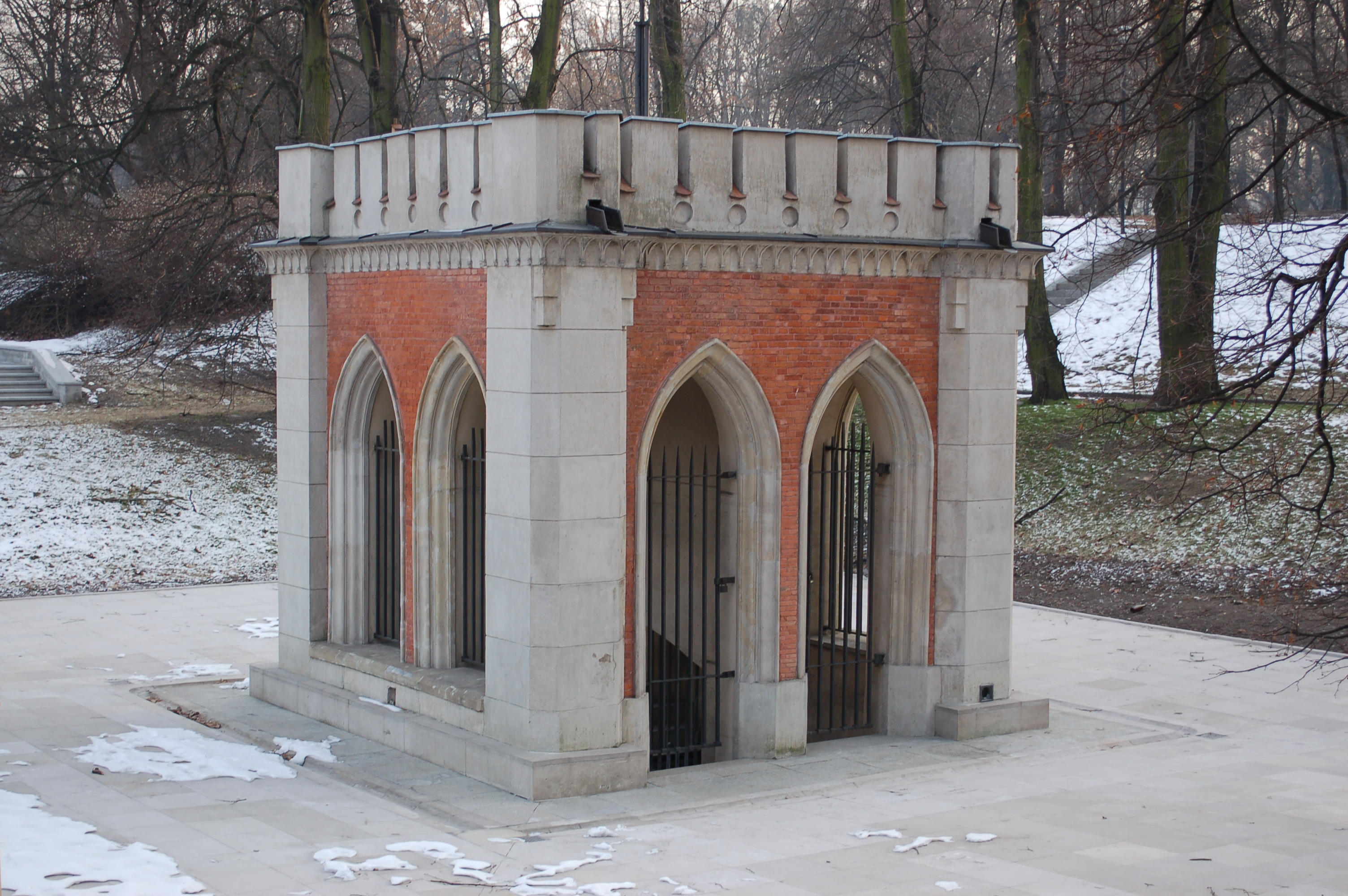
- The Royal Spring
- Interactive map of the Royal Spring in Warsaw area

General information
- Architectural style: Neo-Gothic
- Location: Romuald Traugutt Park, Zakroczymska Street, Warsaw, Poland
- Coordinates: 52°15′29.95″N 21°0′14.58″E
- Construction started: 1770
- Renovated: 1836
- Cost: 50 ducats
- Client: Stanisław August Poniatowski

Technical details
- Material: Brick

Design and construction
- Architect: Enrico Marconi

The Royal Spring (Zdrój Królewski) is a well located in Romuald Traugutt Park on Zakroczymska Street in Warsaw. The spring's building was built in the 18th century, with construction beginning in 1770. It is also called the King Stanislaus Augustus Spring. In the 18th century it was very popular with residents of the Warsaw New Town as well as travellers, although the drinking water had to be paid for.

== Architecture and style ==
In the first half of the 18th century the Royal Spring was a wooden structure, and from 1770 to 1772 proper walls were built for it. The building was financed by King Stanisław August Poniatowski (1732-1798), with 50 ducats.

The monument was covered by the construction of the Warsaw Citadel in 1832. Discovered and excavated later it was restored to its original style and shape. From 1834 to 1836, engineering work began under the supervision of the City of Warsaw's engineer Edward Klopmann as part of the city's water works. It was built to a design by Enrico Marconi in Neo-Gothic style. It used the characteristic ogive-style arches and the interior walls and exterior were covered with typical red brick. In contrast, the roof of the monument was surrounded by decorative vases.

A final renovation was carried out from 1931 to 1933. The designers were Stanisław Płoski i Andrzej Węgrzecki. They added new elements including a roof crowned with a crenellated parapet. In 1959 a new roof was added.

On the front side of the building is a plaque in Latin: "STANISLAUS AUGUSTUS PROSPICIENDO PUBLICAE SALUBRITATI Hunca FONTANA RESTAURARI JUSSIT. ANNO MDCCLXXI" (Stanislaus Augustus in the interests of public health commanded the source to be restored to order in the year 1771).

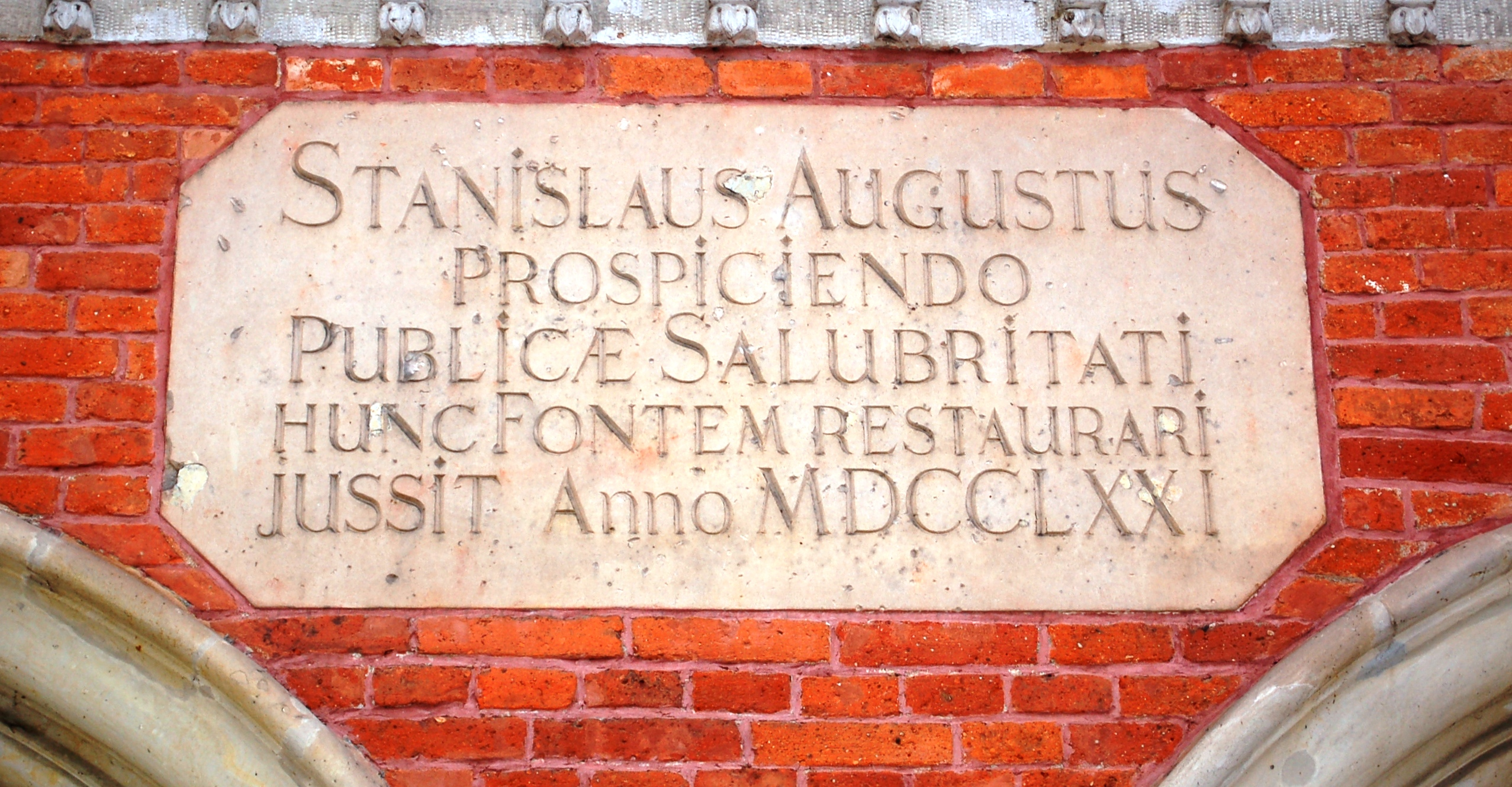
A plaque on the building

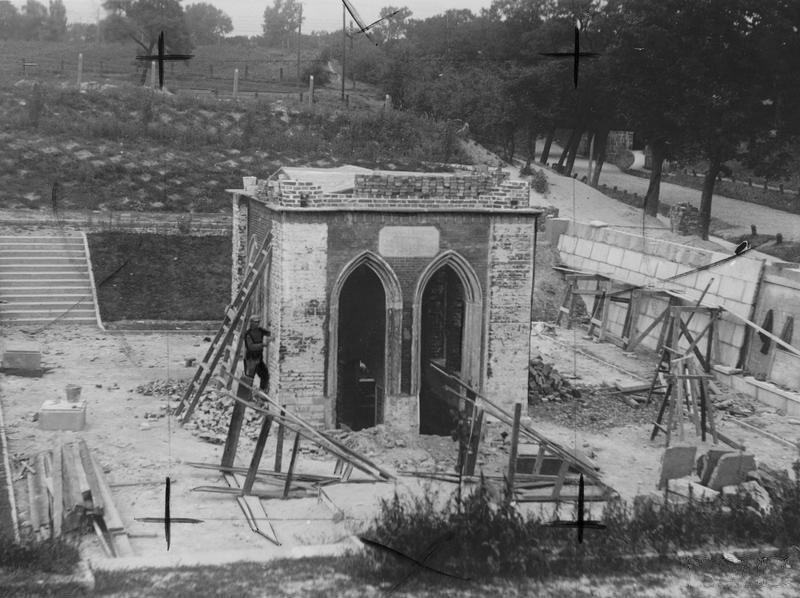
Work on the reconstruction

== Bibliography ==
- PRZEMYSŁAW MILLER (2009-10-27). "Zdrój Królewsk". Miasto stołeczne Warszawa (in Polish).
- Kwiatkowski, Marek [in Polish] (1983). Stanisław August Król – Architekt (in Polish). Wrocław: Ossolineum. ISBN 83-04-00850-5.
