= Romuald Traugutt Park =

Urban park in Warsaw, Poland

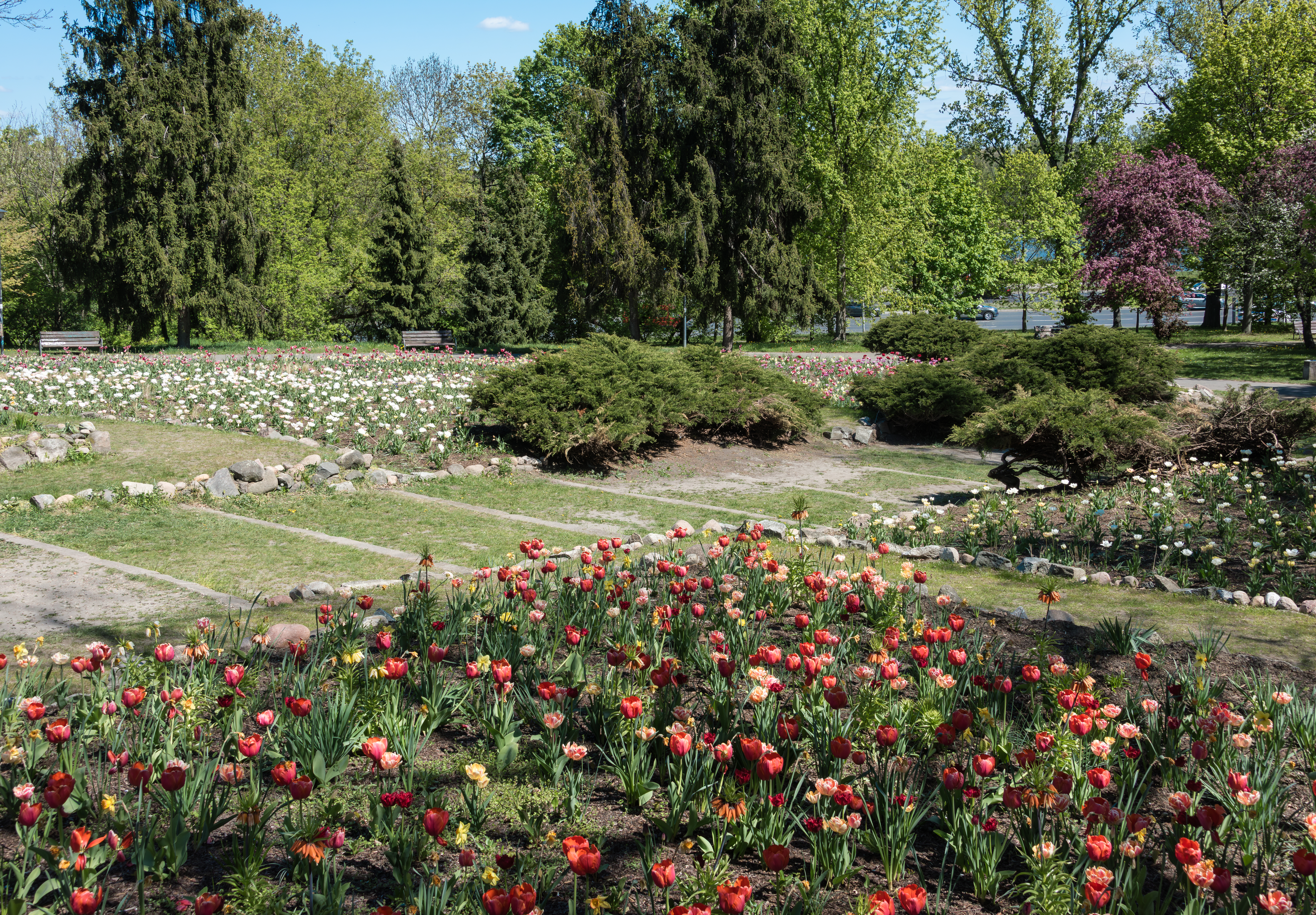
- The Romuald Traugutt Park in 2026.
- Interactive map of Romuald Traugutt Park
- Type: Urban park
- Location: Downtown, Warsaw, Poland
- Coordinates: 52°15′38.59″N 21°00′10.94″E
- Area: 10.36 hectares (25.6 acres)
- Created: 1925
- Designer: Leon Danielewicz; Stanisław Zadora-Życieński

The Romuald Traugutt Park (Polish pronunciation: [rɔˈmu.alt ˈtraw.ɡut]; Polish: Park im. Romualda Traugutta) is an urban park in Warsaw, Poland. It is located in the New Town, within the Downtown district, between Słomińskiego Street, Zakroczymska Street, Wybrzeże Gdańskie Street, Sanguszki Street, Konwiktorska Street, Bonifraterska Street, and Międzyparkowa Street. The park was opened in 1925.

== History ==
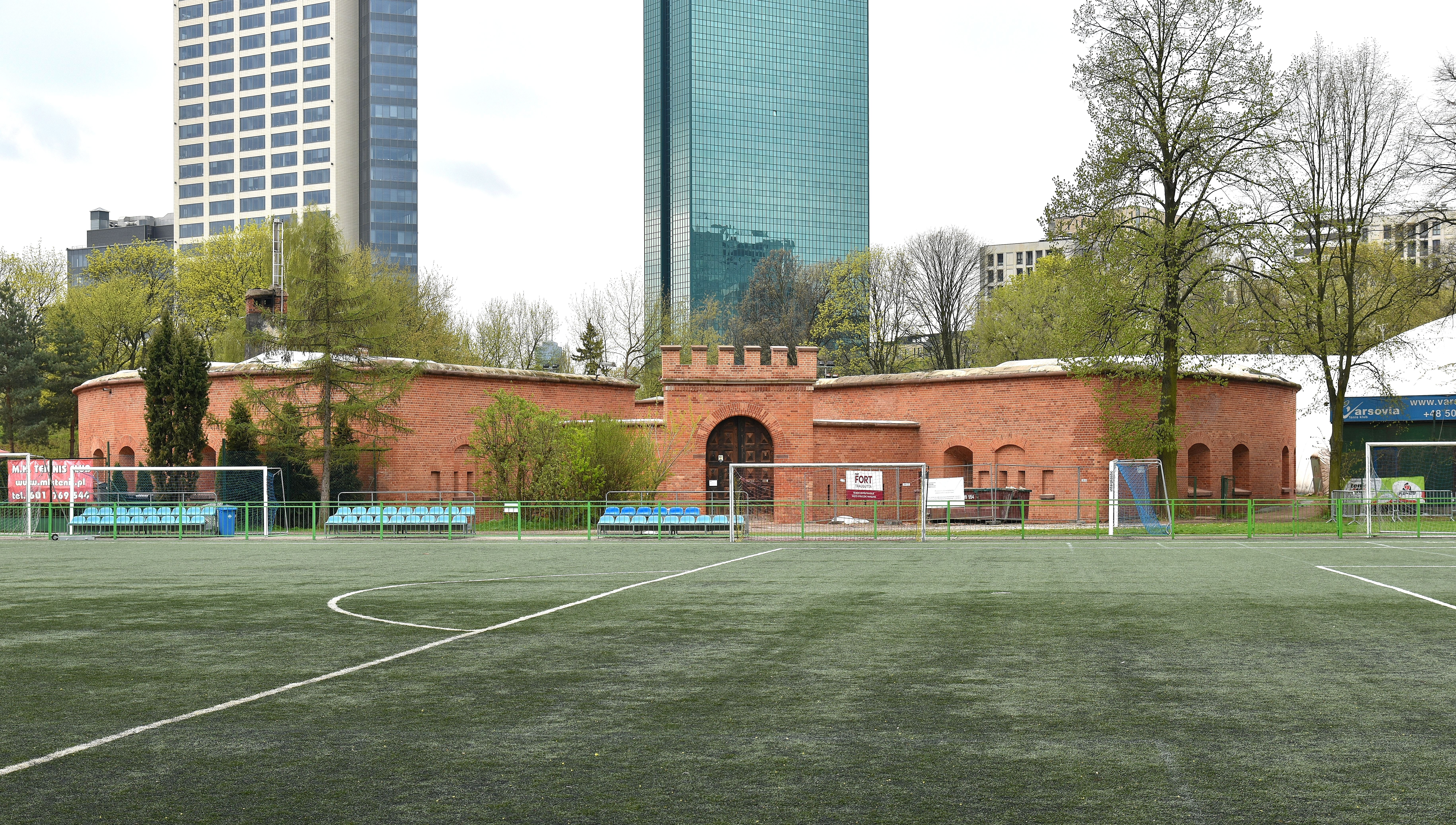
The Traugutt Fort, built in 1847.

Between 1770 and 1772, in the location of the current park, was built the Royal Spring well, founded by king Stanisław August Poniatowski. It was used as the water source by the population of the nearby town of New Warsaw, and by the passing by travelers. The well was renovated and rebuild in the Gothic Revival style between 1834 and 1836.

In the 19th century, in the area were constructed two forts of the nearby Warsaw Citadel complex. They were Traugutt Fort (originally known as Alexei Fort) opened in 1847, and the Fort of the Legions (originally known as Vladimir Fort) opened in 1853.

On 5 August 1864, in the location of the current park, the authorities of the Russian Empire had executed Romuald Traugutt, leader of the January Uprising, as well as Rafał Krajewski, Józef Toczyski, Roman Żuliński, and Jan Jeziorański, ministers of the Polish National Government. On 5 August 1916, there was placed a Christian cross and a rock with inscription on it, commemorating the event.

Between 1925 and 1929, around them was developed an urban park, designed by Leon Danielewicz and Stanisław Zadora-Życieński. It was officially named on 27 September 1926, after Romuald Traugutt.

The park in its original form had an area of 22 ha, and consisted of three parts:

- the eastern portion, with an area of 6.5 ha, opened in 1925, and located between Zakroczymska Street, Wenedów Street, Wybrzeże Gdańskie Street, and Sanguszki Street;
- the central portion with an area of 4.5 ha, opened on 1926, and located between Zakroczymska Street, Konwiktorska Street, Bonifraterska Street, and Międzyparkowa Street;
- and the western portion with an area of 11 ha developed between 1927 and 1929, and located between Słomińskiego Street, Międzyparkowa Street, and Bonifraterska Street.

In 1929, there was placed the sculpture Motherhood, which was made by Wacław Szymanowski in 1903. On 12 November 1938, in the park was unveiled the Monument of the Teachers, dedicated to the Polish teachers active after the Partitions of Poland. It was destroyed in 1944, under the German occupation during the World War II. It was rebuilt and unveiled again on 22 November 1958.

In the 1960s, the northeastern portion of the park, between Słomińskiego Street, Międzyparkowa Street, and Bonifraterska Street, was separated forming the Janusz Kusociński School Sports Park. There were placed sports amenities. It was named after Janusz Kusociński, an athlete and a gold medalist at the 1932 Summer Olympics. The park also includes the Traugutt Fort.

In 1965, in the park was placed the sculpture Loneliness by Zofia Woźna, made from the columns of the recently deconstructed Kronenberg Palace.

In 2010, there was unveiled the art installation by Magdalena Abakanowicz, consisting of four sculptures, titled the 2010 Crossroads.

Currently, since 2021, in the park at the intersection of Zakroczymska Street and Wenedów Street, is ongoing construction of a hotel.

== Characteristics ==
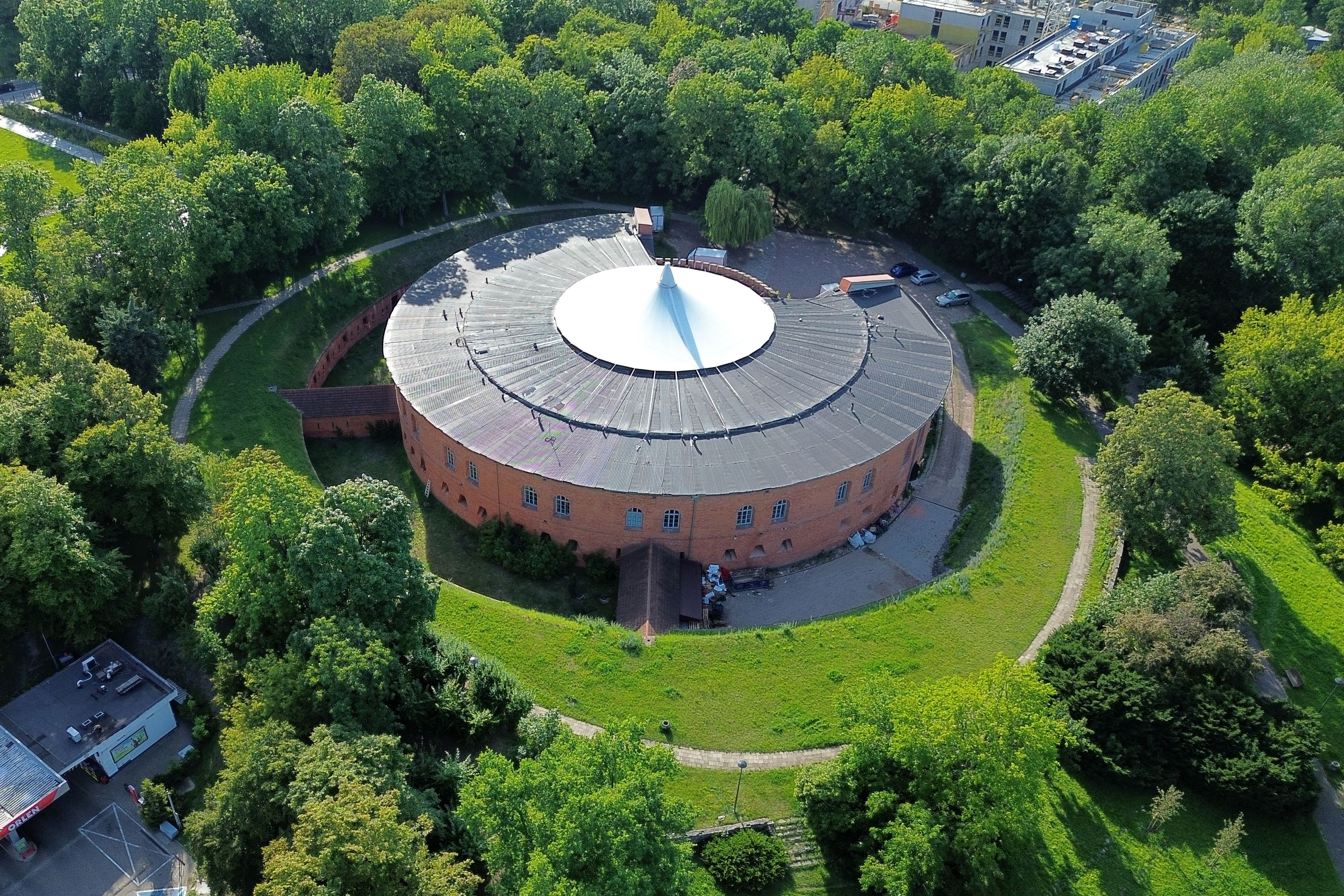
The Fort of the Legions in 2024.

The park is located in the Old Town, within the Downtown district, between Słomińskiego Street, Zakroczymska Street, Wybrzeże Gdańskie Street, Sanguszki Street, Konwiktorska Street, Bonifraterska Street, and Międzyparkowa Street. It has the total area of 10.36 ha.

Within the park is located the Fort of the Legions, a 19th-century military fortification, while nearby are also the Traugutt Fort, and the main Warsaw Citadel complex. There is also the Royal Spring, a historical water well.

The park also includes the Monument of the Teachers, dedicated to the Polish teachers active after the Partitions of Poland, and the monument dedicated to the leaders of the Polish National Government in the January Uprising, that were executed there in 1864. There are also sculptures Motherhood (Polish: Macieżyństwo) by Wacław Szymanowski from 1903, Loneliness (Polish: Samotność) by Zofia Woźna from 1965, and 2010 Crossroads (Polish: Rozdroże 2010) by Magdalena Abakanowicz from 2010.

It borders the Janusz Kusociński School Sports Park (Polish: Szkolny Park Sportowy im. Janusza Kusocińskiego), located between Słomińskiego Street, Międzyparkowa Street, and Bonifraterska Street. It includes numerous sports amenities including association football field. There is also the Traugutt Fort.

== Gallery ==
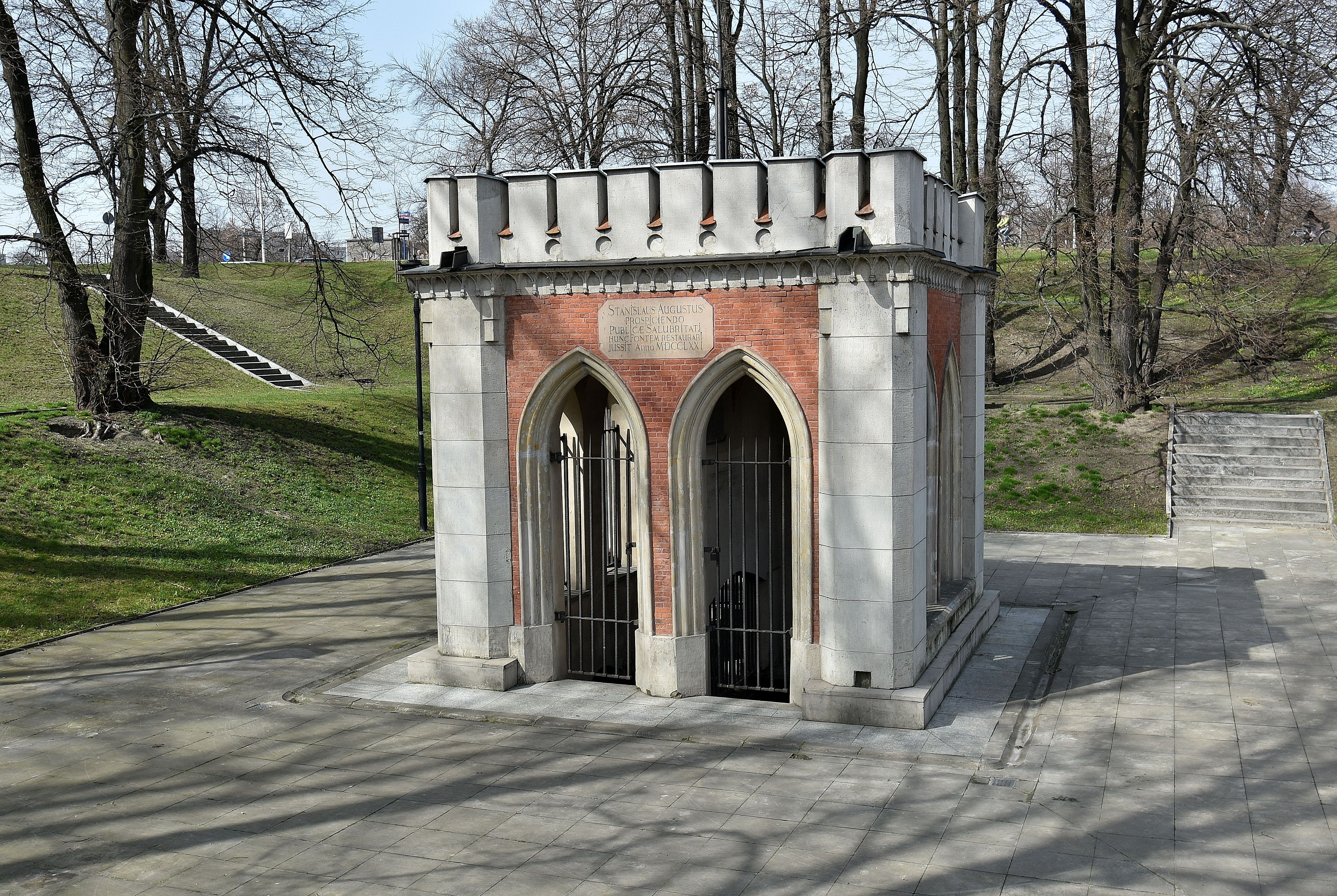
The Royal Spring.

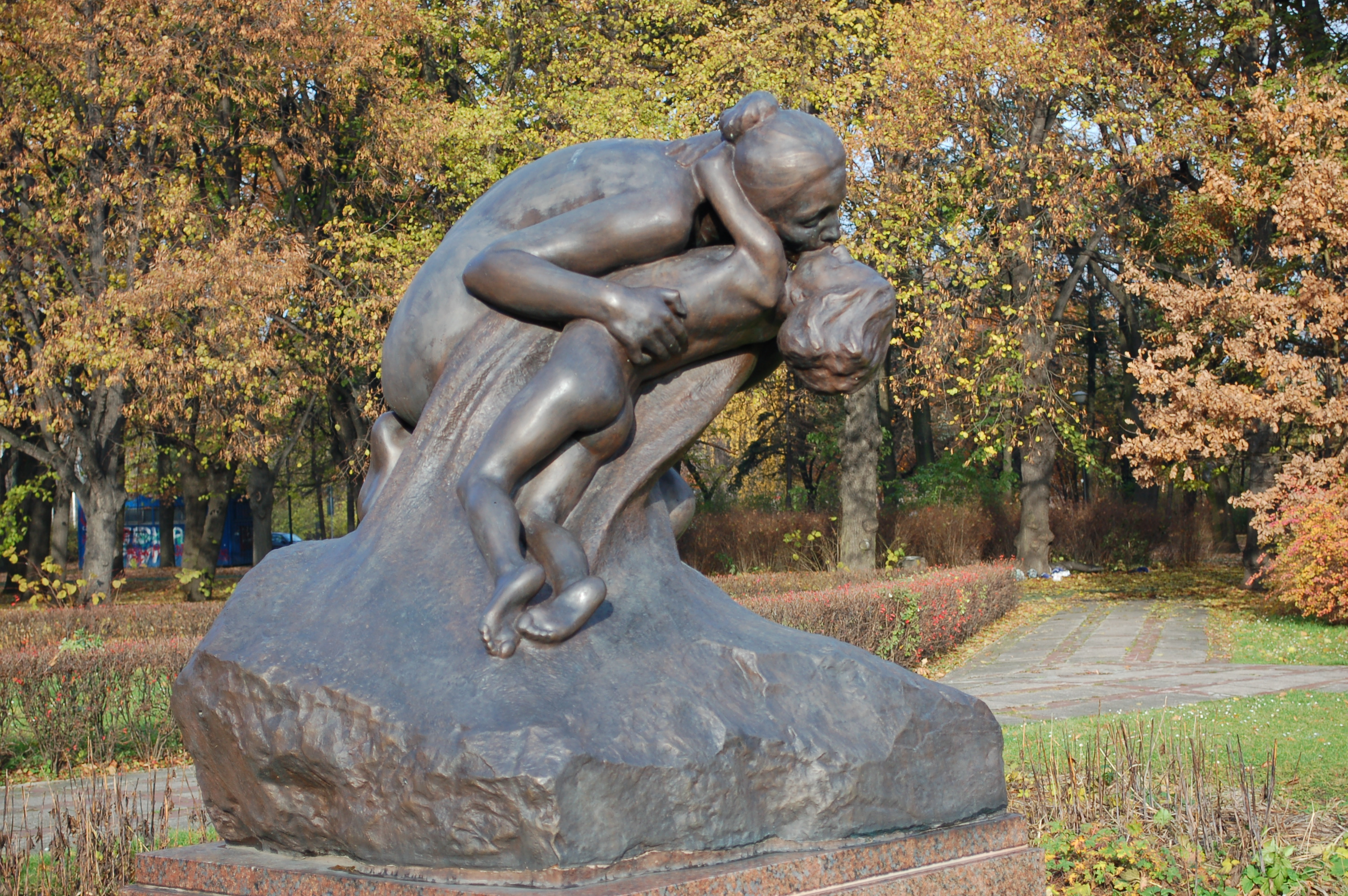
The sculpture Motherhood by Wacław Szymanowski.

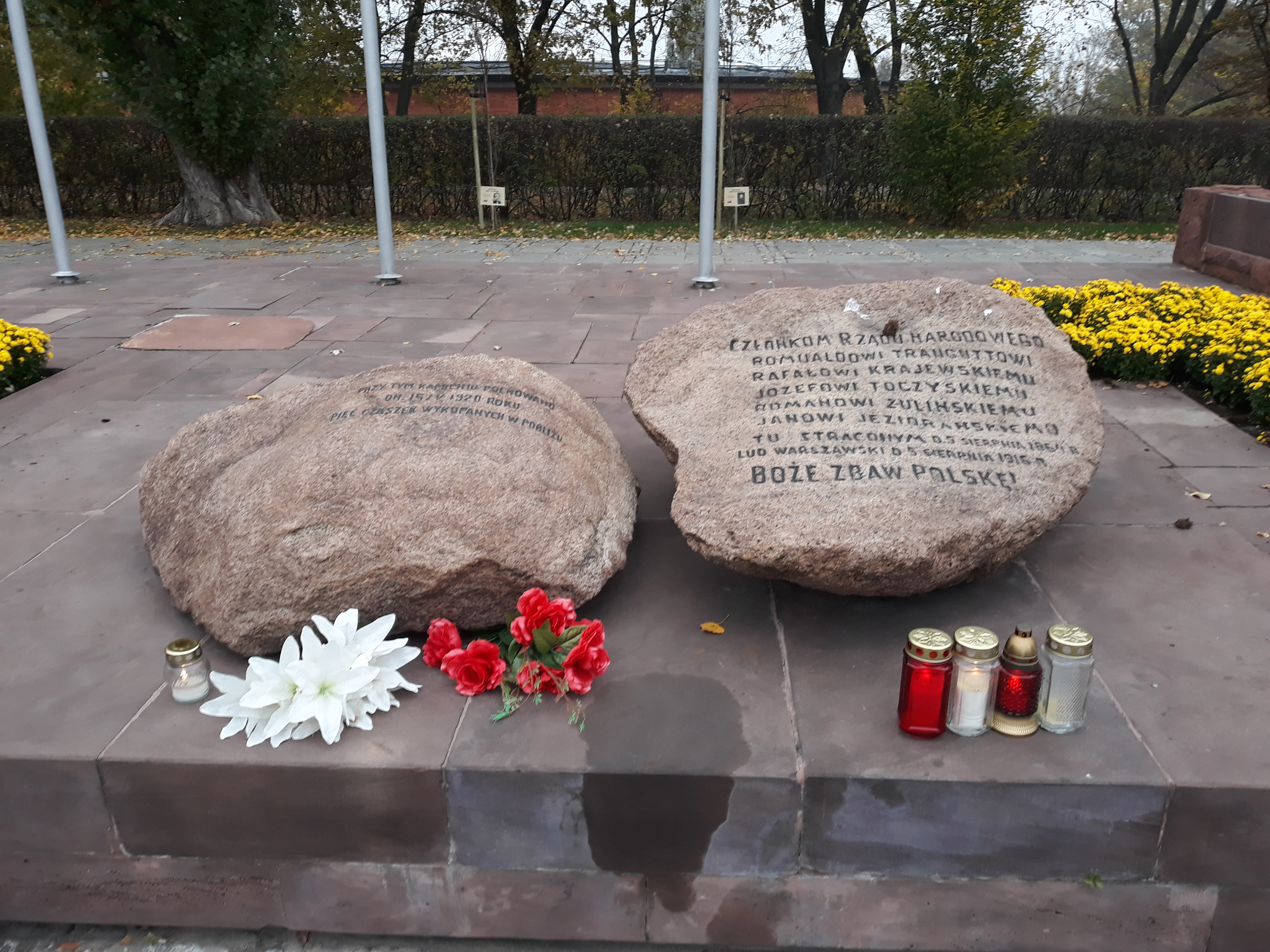
The monument dedicated to the leaders of the Polish National Government in the January Uprising.

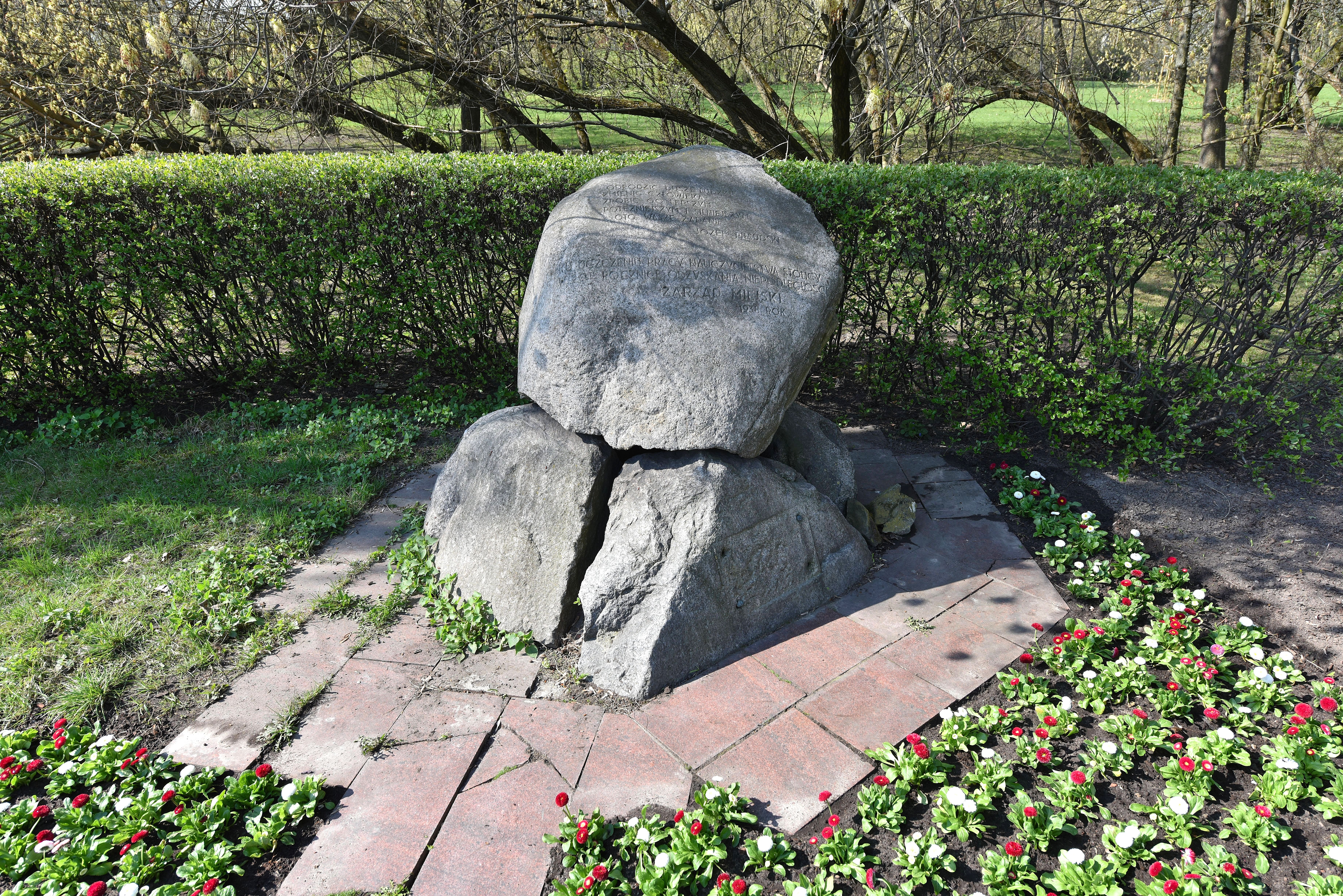
The Monument of the Teachers.

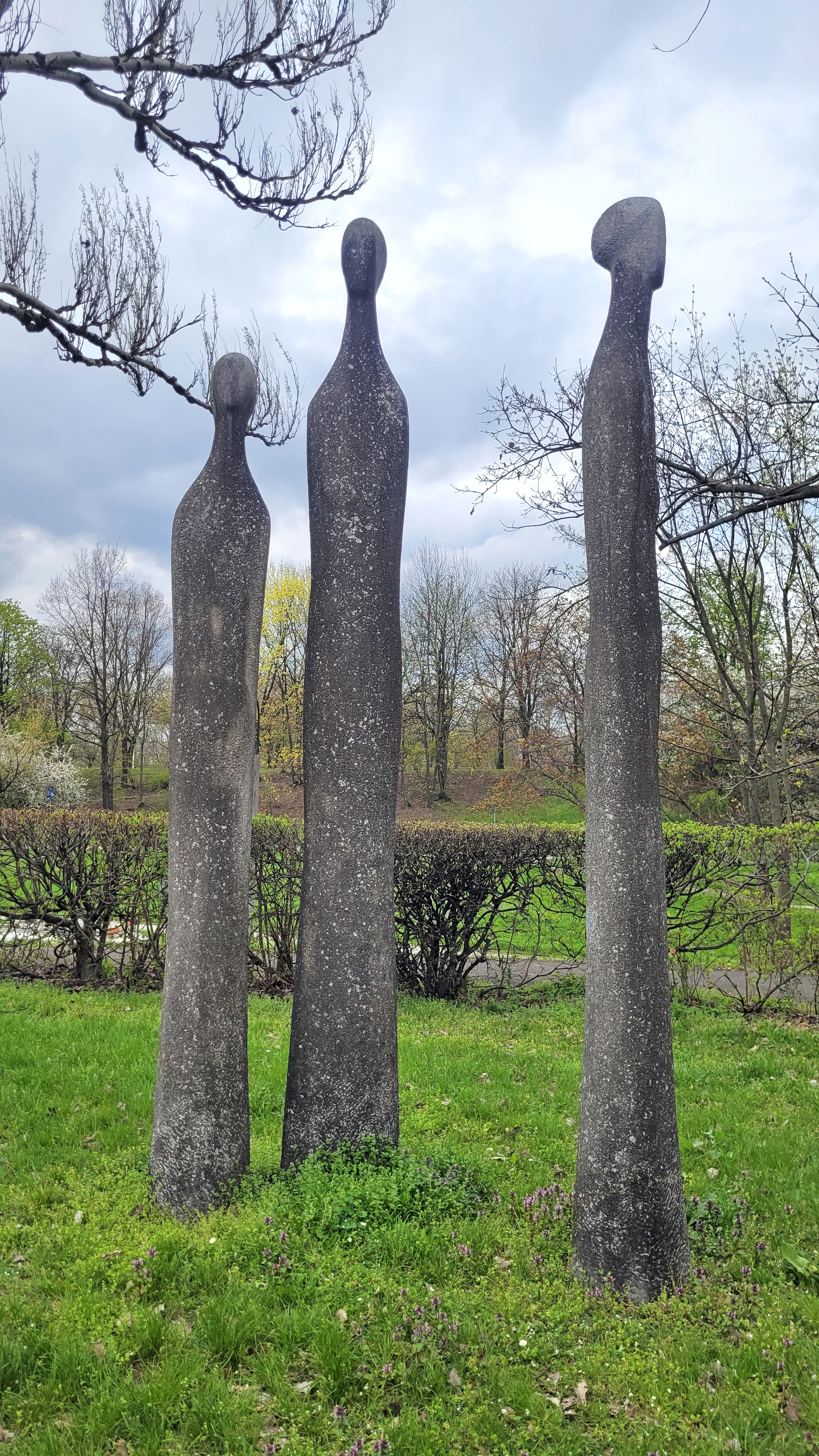
The sculpture Loneliness by Zofia Woźna.

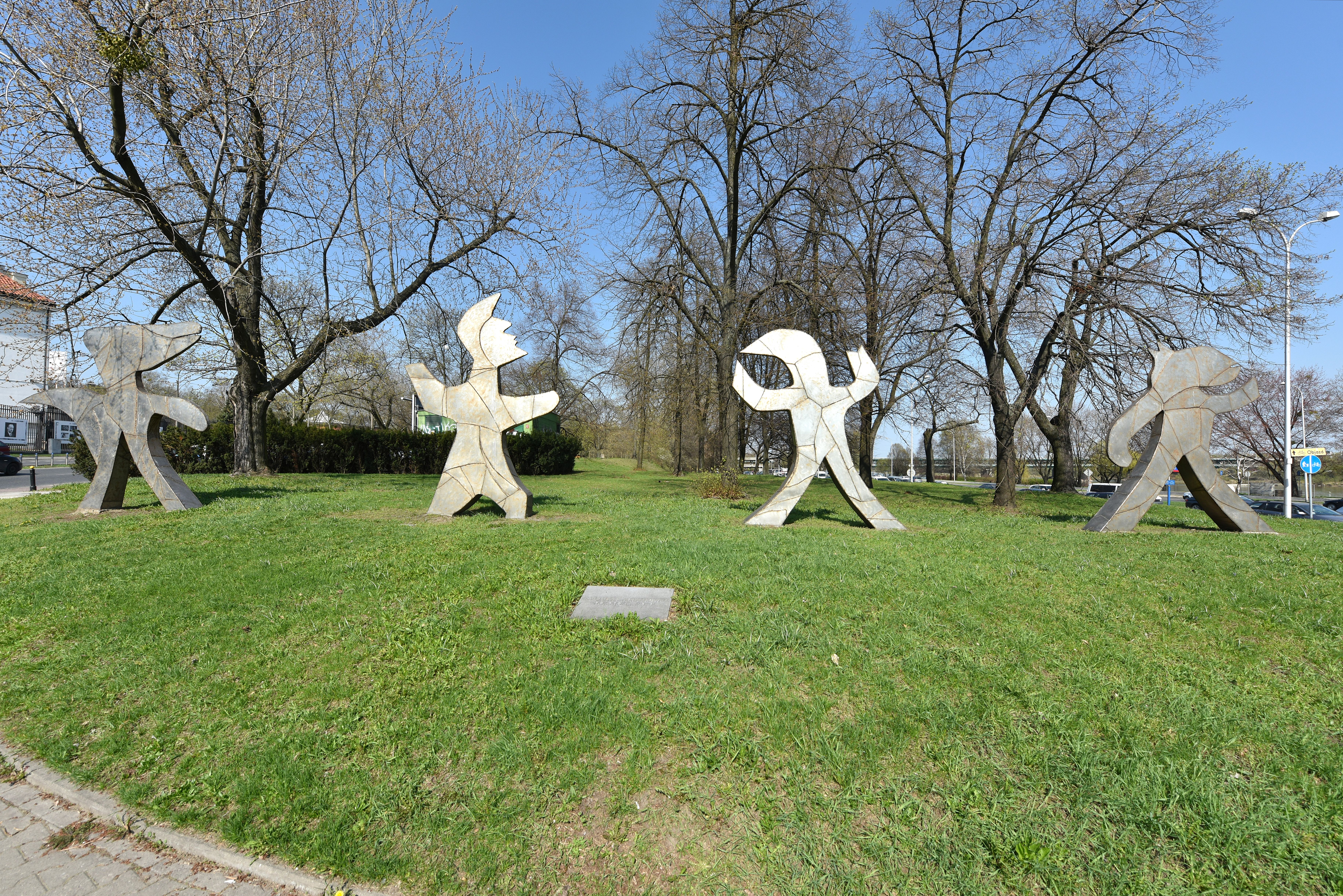
The art installation 2010 Crossroads by Magdalena Abakanowicz.
