= London Poles =

London Poles may refer to:

- Poles in the United Kingdom in London
- Polish government-in-exile, in London, 1940–1990
