= 1916 Warsaw City Council election =

Elections to the Warsaw City Council were held in July 1916 – under German occupation during World War I. It was the first modern municipal election in Warsaw, as well as the first local election in Poland after the Russian retreat. The electorate was divided into six curiae, each with 15 seats in the council. As a pre-electoral pact was reached for four out of the six curiae, voting was held only in the Third Curia (intellectuals) and the Sixth Curia (general public). In the Sixth Curia, to which most voters belonged, the winners were the National Democracy on the Polish side and the Folkists on the Jewish side. Per Jesse Kaufmann (2015) "the election brought to the fore the question of Polish-Jewish relations and triggered an attempt on part of the occupiers to limit Jewish influence while maintaining a facade of strict impartiality".

== Background ==
On July 1, 1915, the German authorities issued call for convening City Councils in occupied Poland based on Prussian model, to replace system of Citizens Committees put in place under Russian rule. On August 6, 1915, the Warsaw Citizen's Committee overtook functions of the city government. The Warsaw Citizens Committee eventually approached the German authorities asking for elections, and on March 23, 1916, the German occupation authorities agreed that the Citizens Committee would be replaced by an elected City Council.

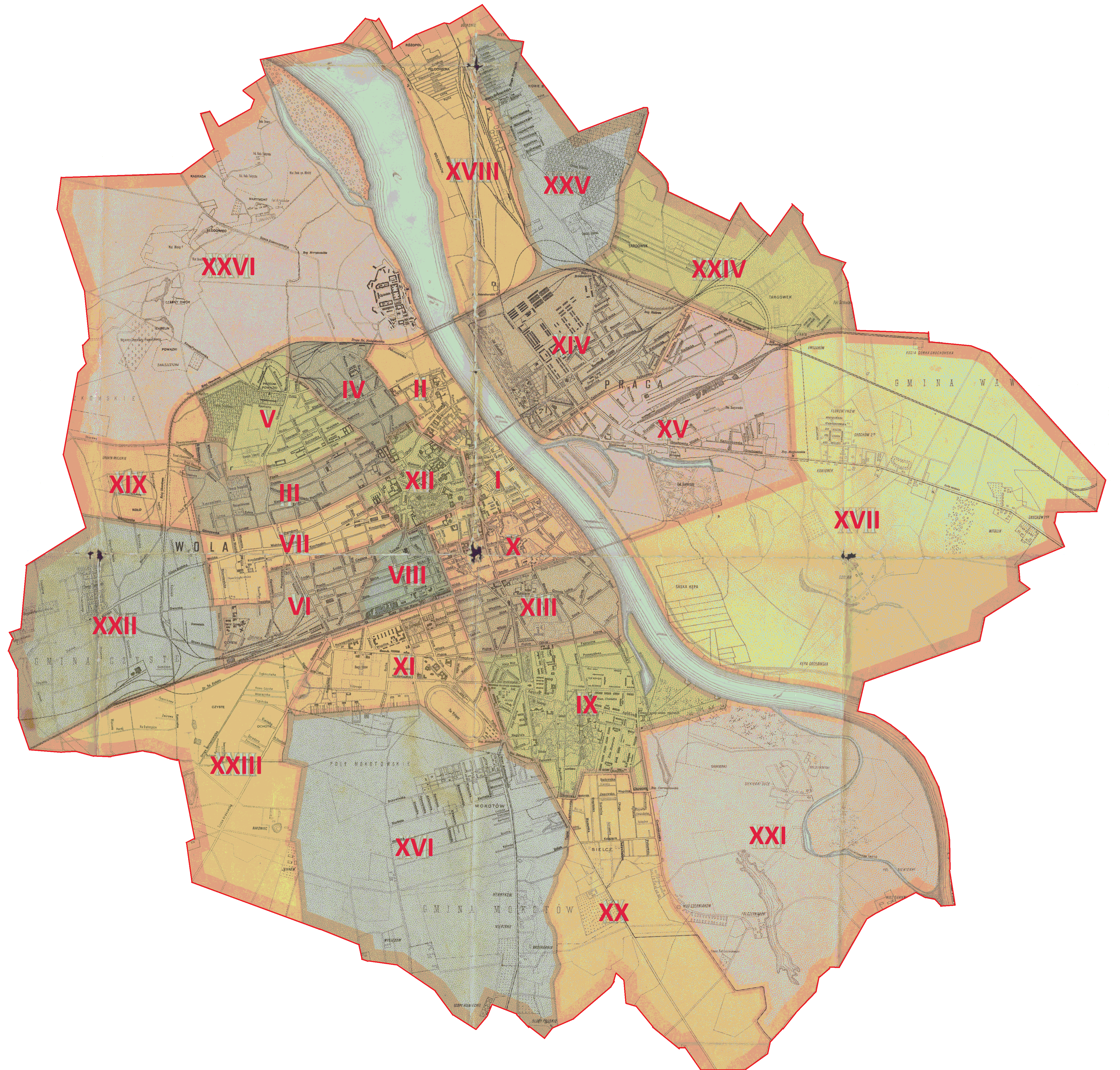
The 26 Militia Districts

Furthermore, during the spring of 1916, the city boundaries of Warsaw were expanded with suburbs being integrated into the city – on the Vistula River left bank; Czerniaków, Siekierki, Szopy, Mokotów, Ochota, Czyste, Wola, Koło, Powązki, Bielany, Marymont, Buraków and Słodowiec, on the right bank; Golędzinów, Żerań, Szmulowizna, Bródno, Pelcowizna, Targówek, Kawęczyn, Grochów, Saska Kępa, Kamionek and Gocławek. Through the incorporation of these areas into the city, the area of Warsaw grew from 32.75 square kilometres to 114.83 square kilometres. Under German rule, the city was divided into 26 militia commissariat districts.

== Citizens Committee draft ordinance ==
The Warsaw Citizens Committee held several extraordinary meetings in April 1916, to discuss a draft electoral ordinance for the City Council election. The most extensive of these meetings occurred on April 16, 1916. At the meeting Piotr Drzewiecki called for a fixed quota for Jewish members of the City Council, to avoid a potential Jewish majority. Zdzisław Lubomirski, installed by the German authorities as mayor of Warsaw, called for measures to restrict the numbers of Jews that could participate in the election in order to guarantee the Polish character of the City Council. Others criticized Lubomirski's propositions, stating that such measures would cause embarrassment to Poland internationally. Samuel Dickstein, a Jewish assimilationist, rejected the argument that Jews would constitute a unified political bloc. In the end the proposals calling for restricting Jewish participation were voted down with 8 votes in favour, 15 against and 1 abstention.

== Prussian electoral system and voter registry ==
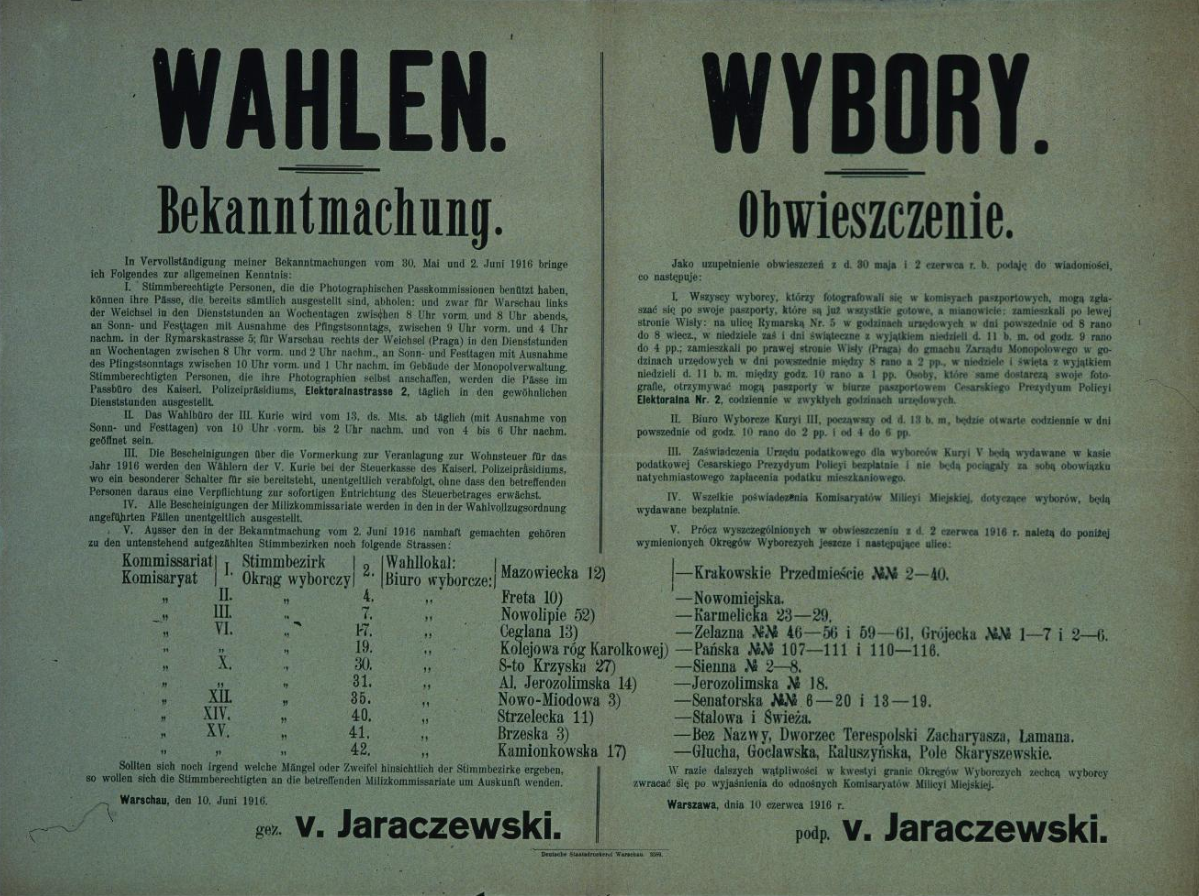
Decree by Imperial Electoral Commissar Jaraczewski calling on voters to register, 10 June 1916

The German occupation authorities ultimately rejected the Warsaw Citizens Committee April 1916 draft electoral ordinance, and instead opted for an electoral ordinance based on the Prussian system of separate and unequal curiae. On May 28, 1916, the German occupation authorities issued a bulletin with the provisions for the election of the Warsaw City Council. The electoral regulation mixed a system of curiae with proportional election (except in the Third Curia). The new City Council would have 90 seats. Candidates had to be men over the age of 30 years, with "spotless moral and political reputation" and fluent Polish language skills. Voting rights were given to men aged over 25 years. Moreover, a small number of wealthy and educated women were given the right to vote, albeit only through a male proxy. The German authorities divided the voters into six curiae, with each of the curiae being allotted 15 seats in the City Council. On June 4, 1916, Warsaw residents began entering their names in electoral rolls of the six curiae. Initially interest in the election was low, but the electoral campaign soon captured the attention of the city. All in all by late June 1916, there were a total of 82,223 registered voters.

Curia		Number of registered voters	% of registered voters
First Curia	Real estate owners (landlords)	5,674	6.90%
Second Curia	Trade or industrial license (patent) payers, i.e. representatives of heavy industry and large commercial concerns	1,283	1.56%
Third Curia	Intellectuals, subdivided into six groups – 1st group – Roman Catholic clergy (1 seat), 2nd group – lawyers (3 seats), 3rd group – tutors, teachers and school inspectors (3 seats, with one of the seats reserved for faculty of Warsaw University), 4th group – physicians, dentists, veterinarians and pharmacists (3 seats), 5th group – engineers and technicians with higher education (3 seats, with one seat reserved for faculty of Warsaw Technical College), 6th group – students and others with higher education who did not belong to any of the other five groups of the Third Curia (2 seats)	2,345	2.85%
Fourth Curia	Trade or industrial license (patent) payers (at a lower rate than 2d Curia members), i.e. representatives of craft-based industries, smaller merchants and small businesses	16,050	19.52%
Fifth Curia	Payers of housing tax in Warsaw (in 1915 and 1916)	5,794	7.05%
Sixth Curia	Registered inhabitants of Warsaw who did not fulfill any of the criteria of the first five Curiae, i.e. the working class	51,077	62.12%

The city was divided into 52 electoral districts. The 2,345 registered voters of the Third Curia were not divided into electoral districts.

District	Electoral Bureau	Militia Commiss.	First Curia	%	Second Curia	%	Fourth Curia	%	Fifth Curia	%	Sixth Curia	%	Total
1	Bednarska 6	I	95	5.6	15	0.9	54	3.2	104	6.1	1,425	84.2	1,694
2	Mazowiecka 12	I	14	0.7	101	4.9	294	14.4	270	13.2	1,363	66.7	2,169
3	Miodowa 12	II	52	6.4	20	2.5	107	13.2	32	4.0	597	73.9	808
4	Freta 10	II	106	6.2	1	0.1	230	13.4	40	2.3	1,335	78.0	1,712
5	Nowomiejska 10	II	73	4.1	24	1.4	355	20.1	102	5.8	1,208	68.6	1,762
6	Przejazd 5	III	74	3.3	12	0.5	464	20.9	188	8.5	1,477	66.7	2,215
7	Nowolipie 52	III	95	5.4	16	0.9	312	17.6	123	6.9	1,226	69.2	1,772
8	Nowolipie 14	III	113	4.7	36	1.5	460	19.3	224	9.4	1,546	65.0	2,379
9	Leszno 100	III	58	5.7	7	0.7	139	13.7	12	1.2	801	78.8	1,017
10	Dzika 12	IV	94	3.6	56	2.1	1,225	47.0	397	15.2	835	32.0	2,607
11	Gęsia 20	IV	67	3.6	17	0.9	783	41.8	151	8.1	854	45.6	1,862
12	Muranowska 34	IV	89	4.1	18	0.8	872	40.4	232	10.7	950	44.0	2,161
13	Nowokarmelicka 7	V	88	3.3	24	0.9	657	24.3	252	9.3	1,683	62.2	2,704
14	Pawia 68	V	34	3.4	1	0.1	99	9.9	16	1.6	848	85.0	998
15	Stawki 24	V	52	3.9	4	0.3	233	17.4	74	5.5	976	72.9	1,335
16	Młocińska 9	V	44	4.0	3	0.3	124	11.2	20	1.8	917	82.8	1,108
17	Ceglana 13	VI	117	5.4	12	0.6	281	13.0	133	6.1	1,620	74.9	2,163
18	Twarda 64	VI	112	5.9	7	0.4	369	19.5	126	6.7	1,276	67.5	1,890
19	Corner of Kolejowa and Karolkowa	VI	69	5.2	5	0.4	214	16.1	42	3.2	999	75.2	1,329
20	Grzybowska 45	VII	146	6.0	21	0.9	508	20.8	227	9.3	1,543	63.1	2,445
21	Ciepła 26	VII	46	2.5	11	0.6	604	33.1	81	4.4	1,084	59.4	1,826
22	Chłodna 44	VII	85	4.5	12	0.6	379	20.3	53	2.8	1,340	71.7	1,869
23	Grzybowska 45	VII	63	4.8	3	0.2	178	13.5	31	2.4	1,043	79.1	1,318
24	Twarda 35	VIII	109	4.7	49	2.1	669	29.1	244	10.6	1,231	53.5	2,302
25	Sosnowa 13	VIII	152	6.3	35	1.4	455	18.8	273	11.3	1,508	62.2	2,423
26	Złota 58	VIII	132	5.7	42	1.8	411	17.8	209	9.1	1,514	65.6	2,308
27	Koszykowa 13	IX	164	11.6	29	2.1	131	9.3	274	19.4	813	57.6	1,411
28	Czerniakowska 72	IX	38	3.3	1	0.1	153	13.3	15	1.3	946	82.0	1,153
29	Chmielna 12	X	113	9.1	47	3.8	227	18.3	183	14.7	671	54.1	1,241
30	Świętokrzyska 27	X	146	10.1	67	4.6	309	21.3	224	15.4	704	48.6	1,450
31	Jerozolimska 14	X	117	6.3	18	1.0	249	13.5	153	8.3	1,314	71.0	1,851
32	Nowogrodzka 41	XI	157	8.0	47	2.4	334	16.9	388	19.7	1,048	53.1	1,974
33	Koszykowa 63 (Market halls)	XI	192	9.5	24	1.2	387	19.1	227	11.2	1,194	59.0	2,024
34	Kotzebue 10	XII	89	8.5	81	7.7	226	21.6	130	12.4	521	49.8	1,047
35	Nowo-Miodowa 3	XII	151	7.0	65	3.0	536	24.9	157	7.3	1,241	57.7	2,150
36	Krucza 31	XIII	194	8.9	40	1.8	359	16.5	291	13.4	1,295	59.4	2,169
37	Nowy Świat 2	XIII	150	9.5	40	2.5	268	17.0	268	17.0	853	54.0	1,579
38	Ludna 16	XIII	27	3.6	4	0.5	75	10.0	23	3.1	623	82.8	752
39	Brukowa 2	XIV	102	6.9	2	0.1	223	15.0	44	3.0	1,113	75.0	1,384
40	Strzelecka 11	XIV	157	10.5	7	0.5	216	14.4	45	3.0	1,070	71.6	1,495
41	Brzeska 3	XV	110	5.9	10	0.5	481	25.6	84	4.5	1,194	63.5	2,179
42	Kamionkowska 17	XV	73	11.5	1	0.2	63	9.9	10	1.6	489	76.9	636
43	House of the Union of Consumer Associations, Mickiewicza Street, Mokotów	XVI	186	9.7	6	0.3	350	18.3	1	0.1	1,370	71.6	1,913
44	Granzow Villa, Grochów	XVII	93	27.2	3	0.9	93	27.2	1	0.3	152	44.4	341
45	Sawicki steelworks, Pelcowizna	XVIII	119	27.3	0	0.0	55	12.6	0	0.0	262	60.1	436
46	Górczewska 18, Koło-Budy	XIX	65	17.2	0	0.0	64	16.9	0	0.0	250	66.0	379
47	Włodarczyk residence, Sielce and Czerniaków	XX-XXI	214	28.8	4	0.5	95	12.8	0	0.0	431	57.9	744
48	Lilpop, Rau i Loewenstein factory, Wola	XXII	140	16.9	4	0.5	119	14.3	1	0.1	566	68.2	830
49	Kaliska 60, Ochota and Czyste	XXIII	123	16.3	0	0.0	125	16.5	0	0.0	508	67.2	756
50	Szczepanowski residence, Targówek	XXIV	149	25.5	0	0.0	143	24.4	0	0.0	293	50.1	585
51	Urbanski residence, Nowe Bródno	XXV	127	37.7	0	0.0	98	29.1	0	0.0	112	33.2	437
52	Suski residence, Gross estate, Powązki	XXVI	172	29.4	1	0.2	88	15.0	0	0.0	325	55.5	586

The newspaper Kurjer Warszawski estimated that 55.86% of the eligible voters were Polish (Christians) and 44.14% Jews. The newspaper made the following estimates for the voters of the First, Second, Fourth and Fifth curiae,

Curia	Christians (%)	Jews (%)
I	67.53	32.47
II	57.18	42.82
IV	40.82	59.18
V	49.20	50.80

Among the Polish right-wing, there were strong concerns about the German-imposed unequal curiae electoral system, as Jews were well represented in the first five curiae. In particular the Polish right-wing was worried about the Fourth Curia (merchants and artisans) where Jews were expected to dominate the vote. The announcement of the electoral ordinance prompted a campaign of harsh attacks against Jewish candidates in Gazeta Poranna 2 Grosze (a newspaper linked to National Democracy). The attacks were especially targeted at the assimilationists, questioning their Polish credentials. Gazeta Poranna 2 Grosze was somewhat more conciliatory in its tone towards the Orthodox Jews, arguing that the Orthodox Jews did not get involved in Polish affairs and that they were "always remembering that this is a Polish country, not a Polish-Jewish country."

== The two Polish committees ==
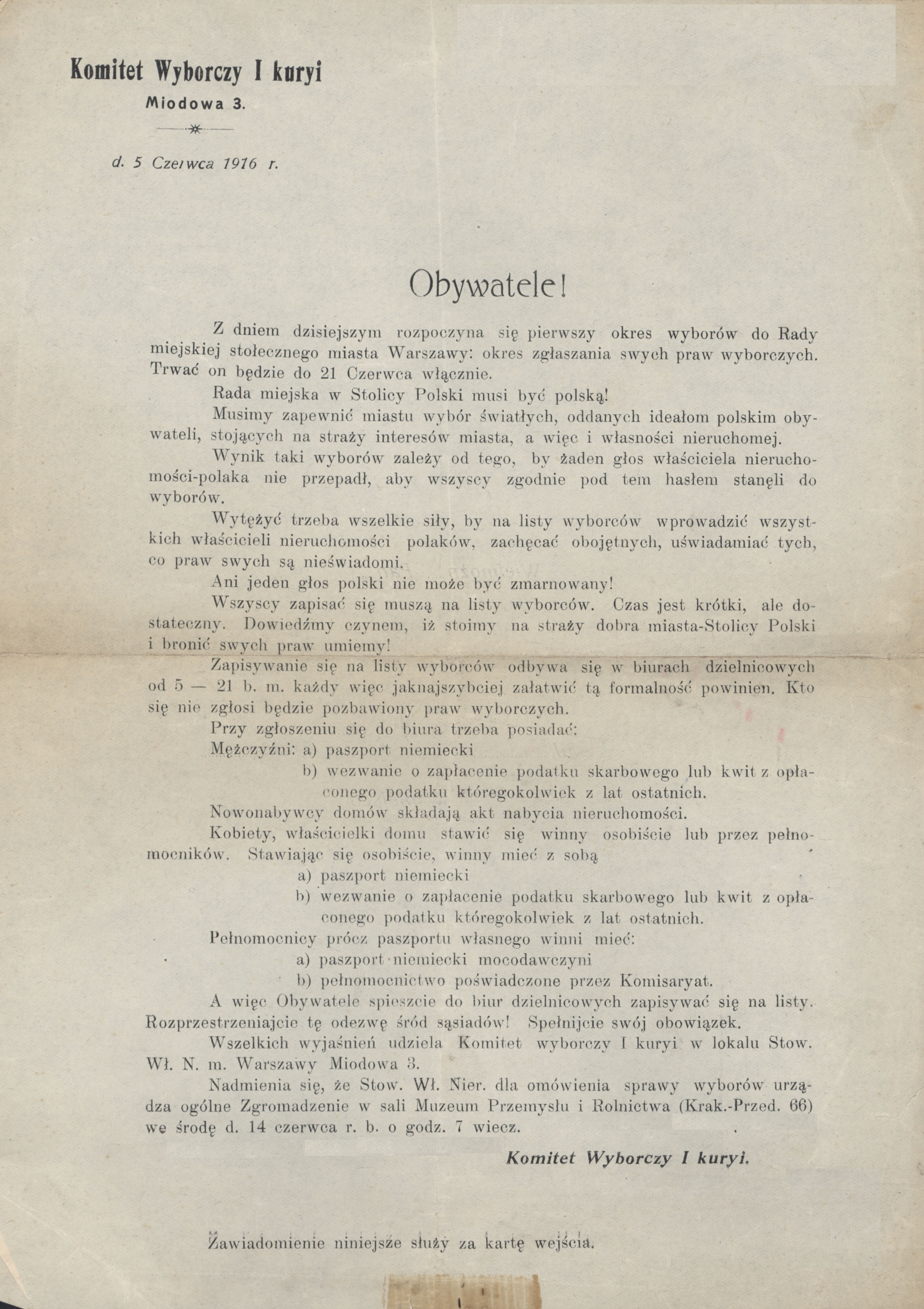
Leaflet of the Committee of First Curia Voters

The Central National Electoral Committee (Centralny Narodowy Komitet Wyborczy, abbreviated 'CNKW'), a coalition of right-wing forces that included the National Democratic Party, National Workers Union, the Christian Democratic Party and independents, called for a City Council that could function as City Parliament and would serve function as a model for the country. As it would be the first elected body in Poland and as the assembly of the Polish capital, they hoped the City Council would be able to function as a national council in the process of moving toward independence.

Another bloc was the Central Democratic Electoral Committee (Centralny Demokratyczny Komitet Wyborczy, CDKW), a coalition of leftist and centrist parties of the "independence camp". They denounced anti-semitism but their agitation als included anti-Jewish slogans, calling to struggle against the threat posed by "Litvaks and Jewish social democracy".

== Launch of the Association of Jewish Voters ==
On June 14, 1916, the Jewish parties established their own electoral committee, the Association of Jewish Voters. Before the beginning of World War I the Zionists had been the major Jewish faction in the city. But in August 1915, part of the Zionist leadership left the Kingdom of Poland. Weakened after the departure of their leaders, the Warsaw Zionists agreed to making an electoral alliance with other Jewish sectors. The Association of Jewish Voters was formed, including Orthodox Jews, Hasidim, neo-assimilationists and non-partisan independents.

The following day, the assimilationists published a proclamation in the press, calling on Warsaw residents to vote according to political views and that a separate Jewish electoral campaign should be avoided, in the name of Polish patriotism. It affirmed that the electoral regulation did not provide for any separate curiae based on nationality. About one hundred individuals signed the appealed, including Samuel Dickstein, Henryk Nusbaum, Michał Bergsohn, Kazimierz Natanson, Jan Natanson and Stanisław Aleksander Kempner.

== Polish-Jewish pact ==
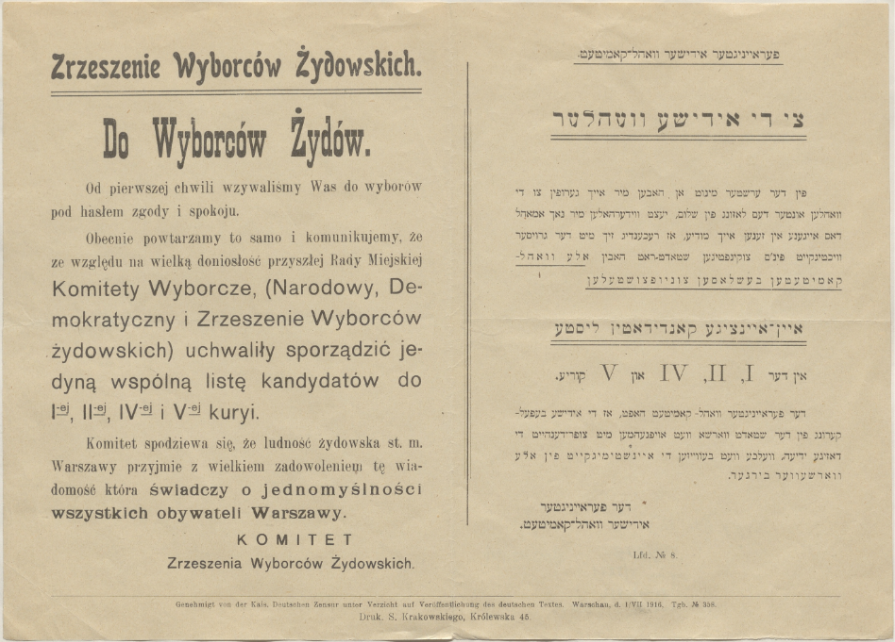
Association of Jewish Voters leaflet, in Polish and Yiddish languages, calling on Jewish residents of Warsaw to support the joint slate in the 1st, 2nd, 4th and 5th Curiae

Largely, due to efforts by the assimilationists, there was a rapprochement between the Association of Jewish Voters and the Central Democratic Electoral Committee, and the two blocs moved towards a consensus solution on the divisions of City Council seats. Eventually the Central National Electoral Committee got on board as well, and on June 30, 1916, an agreement was reached between the two Polish electoral committees (Central National Electoral Committee and Central Democratic Electoral Committee) and the Association of Jewish Voters. The pact divided the seats in the First, Second, Fourth and Fifth Curiae; 26 seats for the National Electoral Committee, 19 seats for the Democratic Electoral Committee and 15 seats for the Jews (12 to the Association of Jewish Voters and 3 to the Bolesław Eiger group). As the joint Polish-Jewish slate derived from this pact was the sole candidate list in the First, Second, Fourth and Fifth Curiae, no voting was conducted in these Curiae.

In these negotiations, the Association of Jewish Voters had settled for a conservative number of Jewish seats. They wanted to avoid a repeat of the aftermath of the 1912 Duma election, which had been used by the National Democracy to spark Polish-Jewish conflict. In 1912, Jews in Warsaw had supported a Polish socialist candidate, and after the election there had been a backlash with boycott of Jewish businesses in the city.

The signing of the pact was celebrated with a reception, with the participation of several German Jews from the occupation administration. Jewish press outlets such as Der Hajnt lauded the pact, stating that for the first time Jews were recognized as political partners. On the Polish side, the liberal publication Nowa Gazeta celebrated the pact as new union of citizens and beginning of harmony between communities. Among the deputies that would be elected from the quota of the Association of Jewish Voters were Zionists (Farbstein, Poznański, Seideman), assimilationists (Eiger, Kirszrot, Weisblat, Natanson), neo-assimilationists (Berenson, Goldflam, Mutermilch), Orthodox (Dawidsohn, Prywes, Wagmajster) and independents (Szereszowski, Truskier).

Some Jewish national activists perceived the Polish-Jewish pact as a betrayal and decided to contest the Sixth Curia election in order to "save Jewish honor". A stormy meeting was held at the premises of the Association of Jewish Writers and Journalists on Tłomackie Street, during which the Jewish Popular Electoral Committee ('Folkskomitet') was founded. The committee was headed by Noach Pryłucki. For the Folkists the real percentage of Jewish voters in the first five curiae were much greater than the proportion of Jewish seats allocated through the Polish-Jewish pact (the Folkists desired that 35% of the City Council seats be allocated to Jews). The Polish-Jewish pact was also rejected by some Orthodox Jews.

== Third Curia election ==
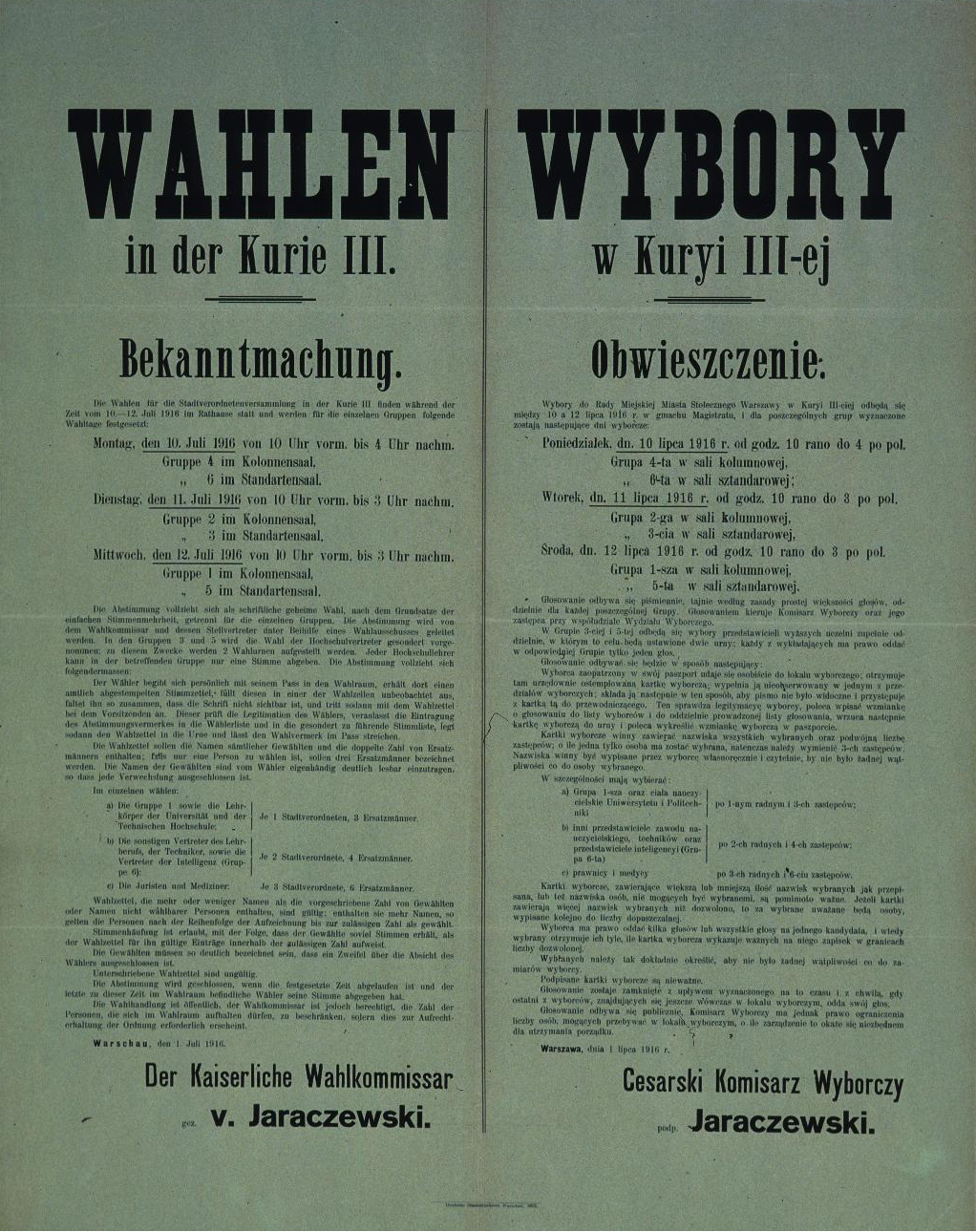
Decree by Imperial Electoral Commissar Jaraczewski to voters of the Third Curia

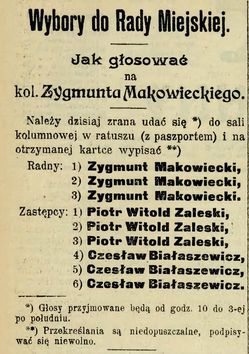
Propaganda for Zygmunt Makowiecki's candidature in the lawyers group, published in Goniec Poranny, calling on voters to cast all of their three votes on Makowiecki

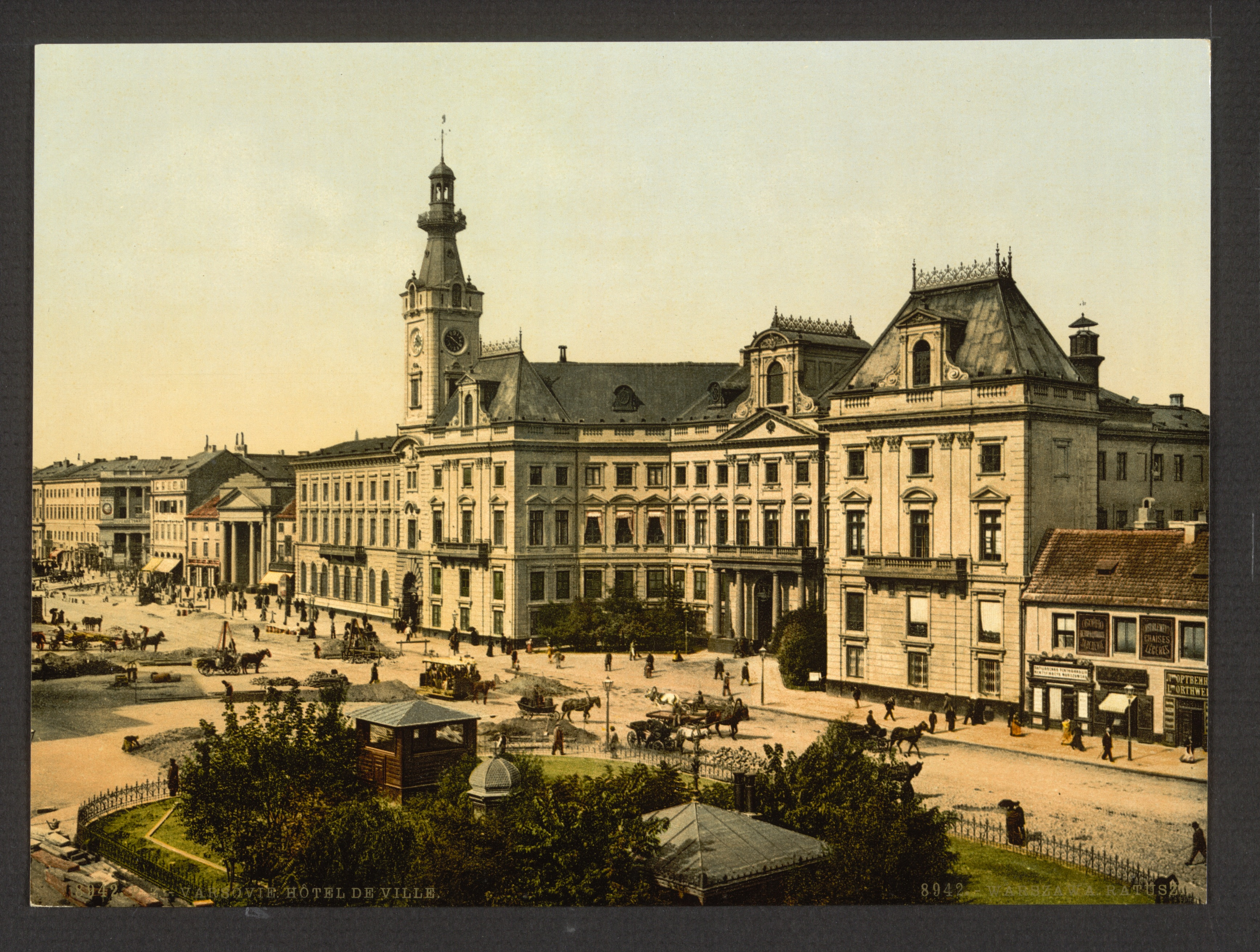
City Hall (Jabłonowski Palace) where the Third Curia vote took place July 10-12, 1916

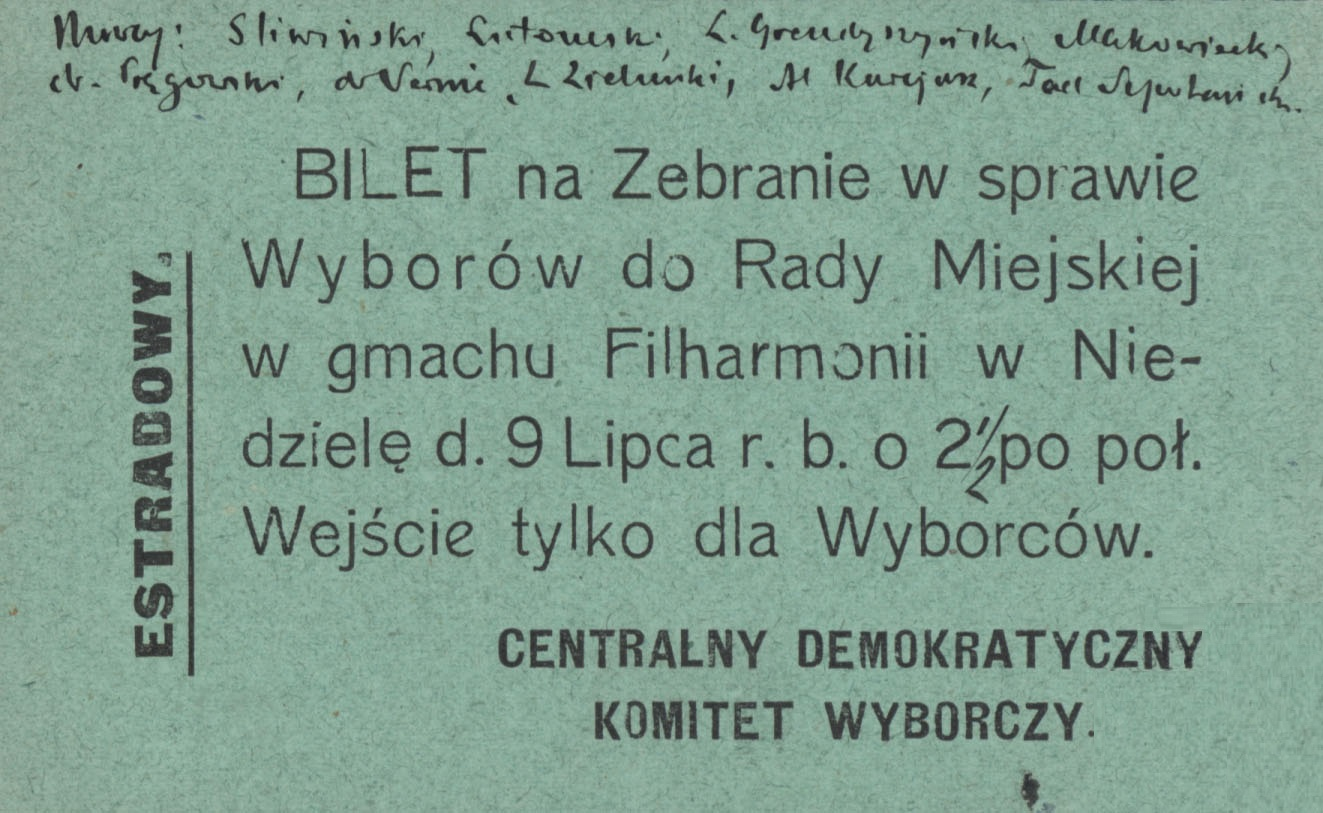
Entry ticket for Central Democratic Electoral Committee meeting held July 9, 1916 at the Philharmonic

Whilst there were attempts to agree on compromise candidate lists for the Third Curia, eventually competing candidacies emerged in some groups within the curia. The voting for the elections in the Third Curia was held July 10-12, 1916 at the City Hall (Jabłonowski Palace).

=== First Group – Catholic Clergy ===
The vote in the Catholic clergy group held under supervision of Imperial Electoral Commissar Jaraczewski on July 12, 1916. Out of 101 registered eligible voters, 70 voted. The election in the clergy group was calm, without competition between candidacies. 65 votes were cast in favour of Kazimierz Leon Bączkiewicz, Assessor of the Metropolitan Consistory, who was elected as the deputy in the Warsaw City Council representing the Catholic clergy. 3 votes were cast in favour of Karol Bliziński (who was elected alternate member with 65 votes), one vote for Marceli Szkopowski (who was elected alternate member with 70 votes) and one vote for Karol Wesołowski.

=== Second Group – Lawyers ===
The lawyers group voted on July 11, 1916. The election was overseen by Imperial Electoral Commissar Jaraczewski. Out of 427 registered voters, 369 cast their ballots. The candidatures in the fray were a democratic-independence oriented list led by Wacław Makowski, a politically neutral list organized by Feliks Ochimowski and an anti-democrat list. The three elected deputies were the Goniec Poranny editor Zygmunt Makowiecki (270 votes), Makowski (252 votes) and the Central National Electoral Committee candidate Ignacy Baliński (226 votes). Ochimowski obtained 222 votes.

=== Third Group – Teachers ===
The teachers' group voted under the supervision of Deputy Imperial Electoral Commissar Dziembowski on July 11, 1916. Out of 346 registered voters, 266 cast their ballots. The two elected deputies were Michał Archichowski (227 votes) and Józef Stypiński (132 votes). Other candidates in the fray had been Klimek (121 votes) and Sosnowski (12 votes). In the subgroup for faculty at Warsaw University there were 32 registered voters, out of whom 30 voted. University rector Józef Brudziński was elected with 28 votes. One vote was cast for Dean Alfons Parczewski (who was elected as one of the alternate members, with 32 votes) and one vote was cast for Professor Józef Mikułowski-Pomorski.

=== Fourth Group – Medical ===
On July 8, 1916, the Democratic Physicians Committee met and agreed to endorse the candidatures of Dr. Witold Chodźko and Dr. Klemens Pawlikowski. In the fourth group (physicians, dentists, veterinarians and pharmacists) the counting of votes cast was completed at 9 p.m. on July 10, 1916. Out of 544 eligible voters, 458 had cast their ballots. Jan Rutkowski was elected from a subgroup of pharmacists, receiving 557 votes. Among the physicians the democratic candidate Dr. Witold Chodźko was elected with 379 votes whilst the national candidate Kazimierz Chełchowski was elected with 224 votes. Other candidates were Dr. Bronisław Sawicki (182 votes), the pharmacist Władysław Żółtowski (9 votes – albeit he was elected alternate member with 650 votes), Dr. Wacław Męczkowski (6 votes), Dr. Kazimierz Rzętkowski (2 votes – albeit in the election for alternate member he was elected with 238 votes), Dr. Alf Bukowski (1 vote), Dr. Adam Kazimierz Przyborowski (1 vote) and Dr. Józef Pawiński (1 vote).

=== Fifth Group – Engineers and Technicians ===
The vote for the fifth group, which gathered engineers and technicians with higher education, was held under the supervision of the Deputy Imperial Election Commissar Dziembowski on July 12, 1916. Out of 293 eligible voters, 265 cast their votes. The election in the fifth group was quiet, without competition between different parties. The architect Franciszek Lilpop was elected with 260 votes and the engineer Antoni Ponikowski was elected with 248 votes. The other candidates were the engineer Ignacy Radziszewski (19 votes, however he was elected as an alternate member of the City Council with 309 votes), the engineer J. Strassburger (2 votes) and the architect Czesław Domaniewski (1 vote, however he was elected alternate member with 71 votes). In the subgroup of the faculty at Warsaw Technical College there were 11 registered voters, out of whom 10 voted. All 10 votes were cast in favour of the engineer Henryk Korwin-Krukowski, who was elected deputy.

=== Sixth Group – Intellectuals ===
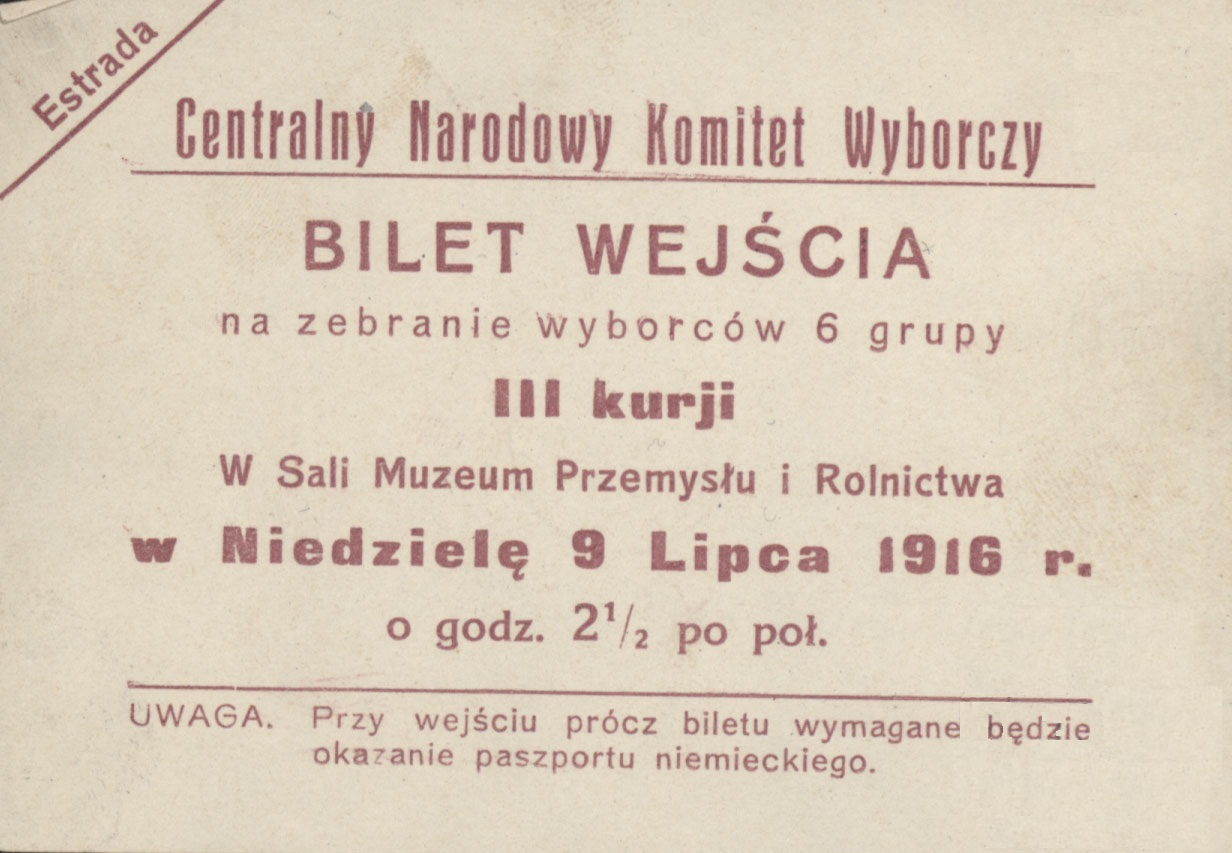
Entry ticket for a Central National Electoral Committee meeting for the Sixth Group of the Third Curia election, held at the Museum of Industry and Agriculture on July 9, 1916

In the sixth group, which gathered students and other residents with higher education who did not belong to any of the other five groups of the Third Curia, the counting of votes cast was completed at 8 p.m. on July 10, 1916. Out of 591 eligible voters, 466 had cast their ballots. There were three candidate lists for this group – the list of the Central Democratic Electoral Committee with two candidates, the list of Władysław Studnicki which also had a democratic-independence orientation and the list of the Central National Electoral Committee with a single candidate. The democratic candidate Artur Śliwiński was elected with 312 votes. The sole Central National Electoral Committee candidate Bolesław Koskowski was elected with 359 votes. Studnicki got 102 votes and Bolesław Lutomski got 151 votes.

== Sixth Curia election ==
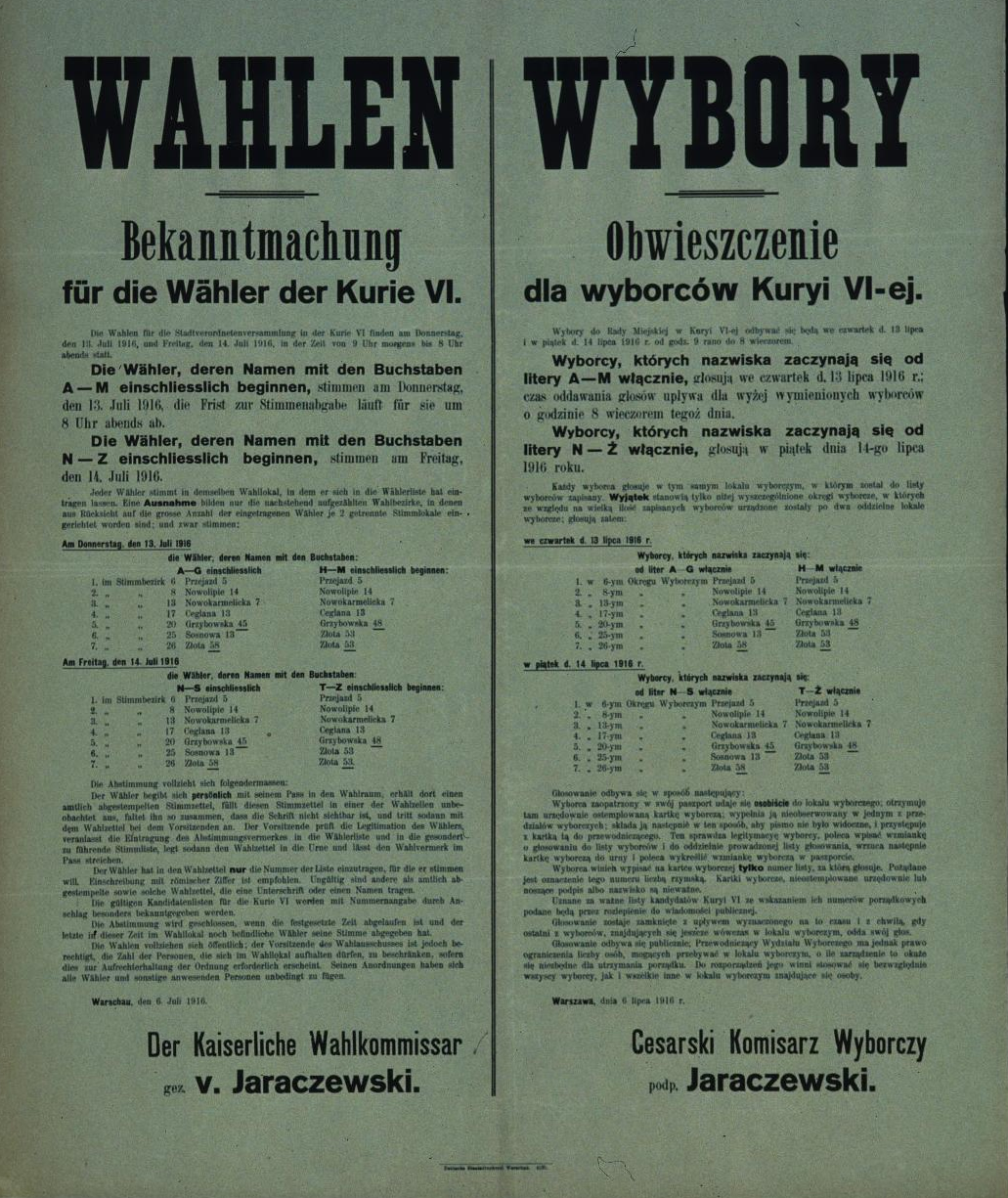
Decree by the Imperial Electoral Commissar Jaraczewski to Sixth Curia voters in 7 electoral districts, instructing them to vote either on July 13 or July 14 depending on the first letter of their surname.

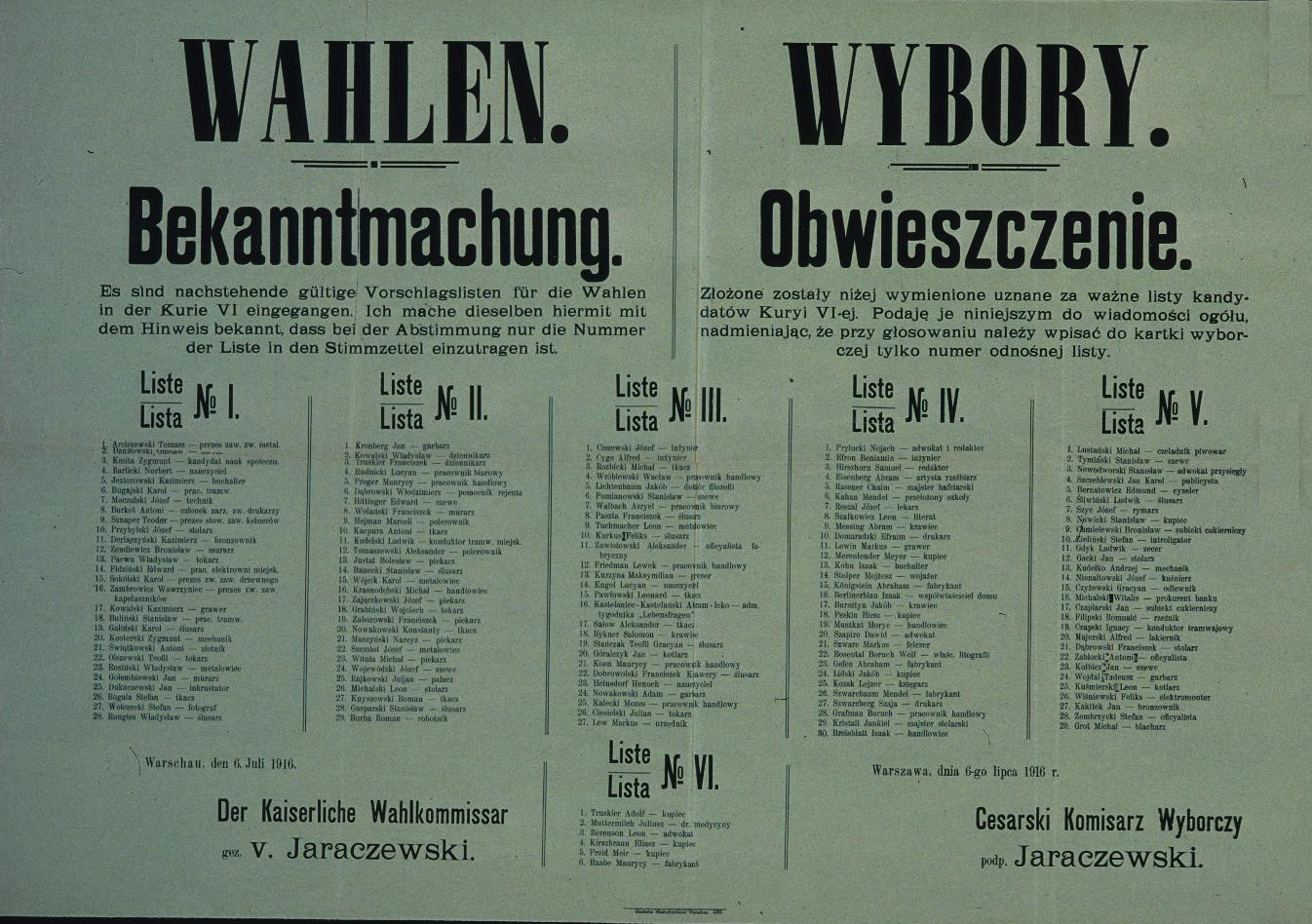
Full listing of candidates of the six lists contesting in the Sixth Curia election

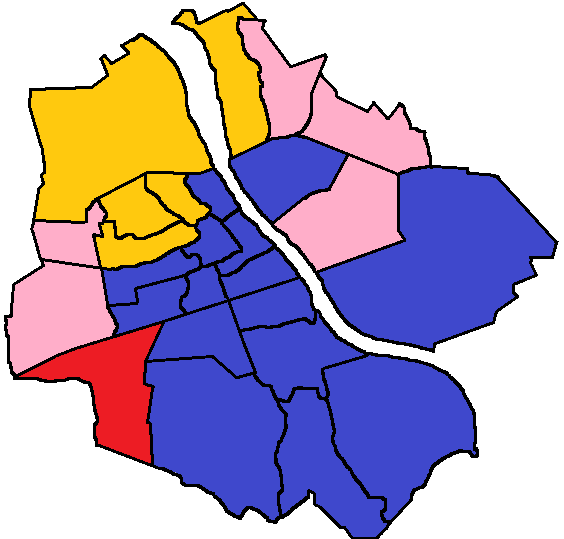
Sixth Curia election, the most voted list in each Militia District. Pink = List I, Red = List III, Orange = List IV, Blue = List V

50,549 Warsaw residents were listed as voters of the Sixth Curia. Six candidate lists were in the fray. The Central Democratic Electoral Committee backed List I of the Polish Socialist Party – Revolutionary Faction (PPS-Frakcja). List II was put forth by the Social Democracy of the Kingdom of Poland and Lithuania (SDKPiL, Marxist Social Democracy).

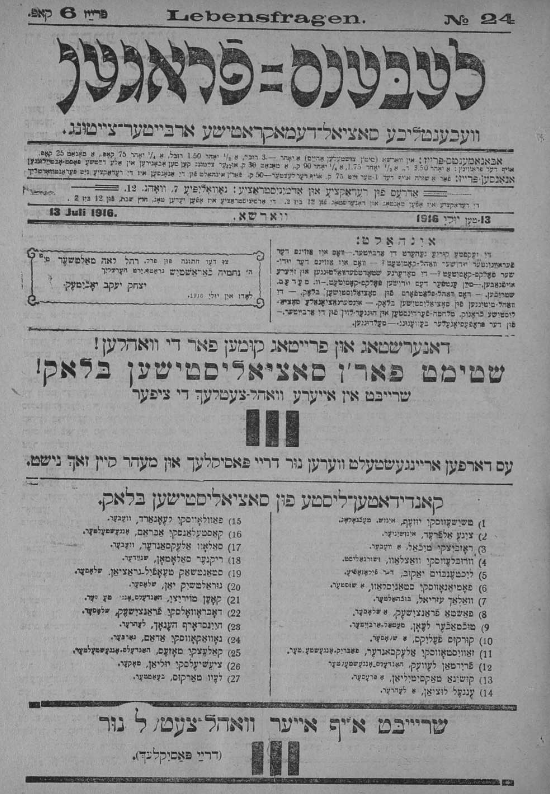
Lebensfragen, July 13, 1916 issue, calling for a vote for the Socialist Bloc List III

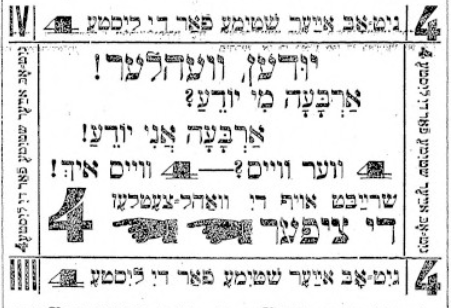
Appeal in Der Moment July 13, 1916 issue, calling for a vote for List IV in the Sixth Curia election

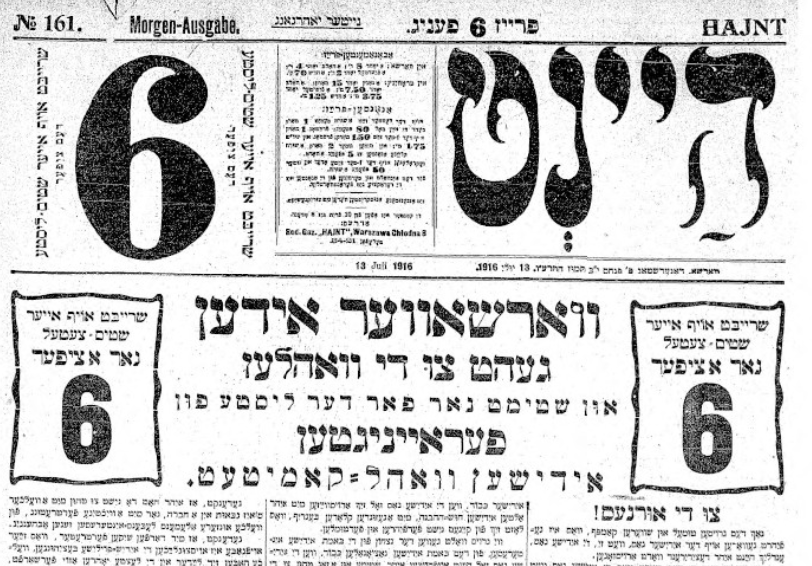
Front page of Hajnt July 13, 1916 issue, with appeal for voters to support List VI in the Sixth Curia election

The General Jewish Labour Bund formed an electoral bloc together with the Polish Socialist Party – Left (PPS-Lewica). The Bund had encountered some difficulty to draft a list of candidates due to the requirements of age (candidates had to be at least 30 years old) and Polish language fluency. The Bund used the electoral campaign to rally against nationalism and antisemitism, arguing that antisemitism functioned as a tool used by Jewish bourgeois nationalists to defend their class interests. Bund called for Jewish cultural rights, the right to use Yiddish language in interaction with government institutions and recognition of Yiddish schools. The Poale Zion didn't contest the election but supported the Bund/PPS-Lewica socialist bloc.

List IV was put forth by the Folkskomitet. Whilst the Folkists opposed the Polish-Jewish pact, they didn't wish to sabotage it as such and thus contested only the Sixth Curia election. The Folkist electoral campaign had a confrontational tone. The Folkist press appeals called on Jewish voters to reject the assimilationists', Zionists' and Orthodox aspirations to illusory peace with the Poles. The newspapers Der Moment and Warszewer Togblat were supportive of Folkist electoral campaign, whilst on the other end of the Jewish political spectrum articles in Der Hajnt repeatedly labelled Pryłucki as an opportunist and a liar.

List V was the list of the National Workers Committee. List VI was the list of the Association of Jewish Voters, which did not raise Jewish national demands in their electoral campaign (rather supporting equal civil and religious rights in general).

The voting days were tumultuous, with many manifestations occurring. Deutsche Warschauer Zeitung reported that Sixth Curia voters were harassed by political campaigners across the city. Nowa Gazeta wrote that "[v]ery heated, sometimes passionate agitation is taking place in front of election offices, especially in working-class districts and in districts with a predominant Jewish population. Delegates of various parties distribute their proclamations by the hundreds. Also noteworthy are the large cardboard placards held on sticks. Scouts with the words "4" on their caps cause a certain sensation in Jewish districts."

Overall, the voting closed at 8 p.m. on July 14, 1916, but in some instances where voters presented late voting extended by a few minutes. There were two commissions to count the votes and compile the result, one led by Imperial Electoral Commissar Jaraczewski and one led by his deputy Dziembowski. Members of the commissions included Marek Borkowski, Antoni Wysocki, count Roger Łubieński, Wł. Tomaszewski, Adolf Weisblat, Dr. Witold Chodźko, Leonard Tallen-Wilczewski, Goldstein, Wacław Makowski, Paweł Nowicki, Wł. Śląski and Tomasz Arciszewski. All in all, 36,781 valid votes were cast which represented 72% of the electorate. The invalid votes were around 1,300 in total.

Pryłucki and the Folkskomitet were the big winners among the Jewish parties in the Sixth Curia election. Gazeta Poranna 2 Grosze decried the election result as an 'extreme victory' for Jewish nationalism. The four Folkists elected to the City Council were Pryłucki, Samuel Hirszhorn, B. Efron and the painter Abram Eisenberg. The sole Socialist Bloc candidate elected belonged to PPS-Lewica, leaving the Bund without representation in the City Council.

=== Results ===
Results in the election for the Sixth Curia of the Warsaw City Council, 1916
List	Votes	%	Seats won
List V – National Democracy and allies	13,988	38.03%	7
List IV – Folkskomitet	8,611	23.41%	4
List I – Polish Socialist Party – Revolutionary Faction	5,916	16.08%	2
List III – General Jewish Labour Bund and Polish Socialist Party – Left	3,711	10.09%	1
List II – Social Democracy of the Kingdom of Poland and Lithuania	2,631	7.15%	1
List VI – Association of Jewish Voters	1,924	5.23%	0

Results in the Sixth Curia by Electoral District

District	List I (PPS-Frakcja)	List II (SDKPiL)	List III (Bund/PPS-Lewica)	List IV (Folkskomitet)	List V (National Democracy)	List VI (Assoc. Jewish Voters)	Total
1	257	58	19	57	715	12	1,118
2	294	48	16	27	721	13	1,119
3	66	26	39	43	282	15	471
4	149	68	28	223	512	20	1,000
5	35	28	95	463	154	71	846
6	67	57	269	482	140	104	1,119
7	56	43	208	426	81	64	878
8	37	43	181	301	103	61	726
9	204	83	11	35	277	7	617
10	2	11	92	427	20	40	592
11	4	12	93	433	13	69	624
12	15	12	136	395	28	85	671
13	23	13	380	654	24	66	1,160
14	60	27	195	208	73	17	580
15	9	7	208	364	31	33	652
16	107	30	70	208	147	25	587
17	127	107	114	307	490	114	1,259
18	131	104	74	179	460	67	1,015
19	123	90	30	43	279	27	592
20	145	103	99	201	480	113	1,141
21	30	17	118	407	79	71	722
22	202	149	41	118	455	40	1,005
23	237	114	43	63	292	23	772
24	28	43	122	390	130	128	841
25	86	78	187	335	254	114	1,054
26	179	100	69	95	612	69	1,124
27	111	44	8	13	414	14	604
28	110	136	49	73	316	12	696
29	97	24	6	3	395	7	532
30	109	30	6	21	366	16	548
31	304	47	23	36	595	7	1,012
32	118	51	23	15	624	15	846
33	190	62	23	39	384	26	724
34	34	19	14	32	303	12	414
35	119	60	71	170	377	72	869
36	171	40	15	70	657	31	984
37	111	21	15	20	473	9	649
38	257	58	19	88	712	12	1,146
39	199	19	44	223	236	19	740
40	216	50	28	145	262	27	728
41	252	45	68	262	217	25	869
42	154	32	15	36	101	11	349
43	216	241	18	42	366	18	901
44	14	2	1	32	37	0	86
45	19	15	15	62	22	2	135
46	95	10	3	3	22	8	141
47	65	40	3	29	73	3	213
48	133	35	30	28	107	7	340
49	79	38	103	42	43	11	316
50	64	13	0	7	60	4	148
51	33	2	1	3	14	2	55
52	34	3	5	35	28	5	110
Note: These numbers are provisional figures from district electoral officers cited in the July 16, 1916 issues of Kurjer Warszawski and Przegląd Wieczorny, and the totals don't fully add up with the full results cited elsewhere.

Results in the Sixth Curia election by Militia Commissariat

Militia Commissariat	List I	%	List II	%	List III	%	List IV	%	List V	%	List VI	%
I	551	24.63	106	4.74	35	1.56	84	3.76	1,436	64.19	25	1.12
II	250	10.79	122	5.27	162	6.99	729	31.46	948	40.91	106	4.57
III	364	10.90	226	6.77	669	20.03	1,244	37.25	601	17.99	236	7.07
IV	21	1.11	35	1.85	321	17.01	1,255	66.51	61	3.23	194	10.28
V	199	6.68	77	2.58	853	28.63	1,434	48.14	275	9.23	141	4.73
VI	381	13.29	301	10.50	218	7.61	529	18.46	1,229	42.88	208	7.26
VII	614	16.87	383	10.52	301	8.27	789	21.68	1,306	35.88	247	6.79
VIII	293	9.71	221	7.32	378	12.52	820	27.16	996	32.99	311	10.30
IX	221	17.00	180	13.85	57	4.38	86	6.62	730	56.15	26	2.00
X	510	24.38	101	4.83	35	1.67	60	2.87	1,356	64.82	30	1.43
XI	308	19.62	113	7.20	46	2.93	54	3.44	1,008	64.20	41	2.61
XII	153	11.93	79	6.16	85	6.63	202	15.74	680	53.00	84	6.55
XIII	539	19.40	119	4.28	49	1.76	178	6.41	1,842	66.28	52	1.87
XIV	415	28.27	69	4.70	72	4.90	368	25.07	498	33.92	46	3.13
XV	406	33.33	77	6.32	83	6.81	298	24.47	318	26.11	36	2.96
XVI	216	23.97	241	26.75	18	2.00	42	4.66	366	40.62	18	2.00
XVII	14	16.28	2	2.33	1	1.16	32	37.21	37	43.02	0	0.00
XVIII	19	14.07	15	11.11	15	11.11	62	45.93	22	16.30	2	1.48
XIX	95	67.38	10	7.09	3	2.13	3	2.13	22	15.60	8	5.67
XX-XXI	65	30.52	40	18.78	3	1.41	29	13.62	73	34.27	3	1.41
XXII	133	39.12	35	10.29	30	8.82	28	8.24	107	31.47	7	2.06
XXIII	79	25.00	38	12.03	103	32.59	42	13.29	43	13.61	11	3.48
XXIV	64	43.24	13	8.78	0	0.00	7	4.73	60	40.54	4	2.70
XXV	33	60.00	2	3.64	1	1.82	3	5.45	14	25.45	2	3.64
XXVI	34	30.91	3	2.73	5	4.55	35	31.82	28	25.45	5	4.55

== Elected deputies ==
The new city council was inaugurated on July 24, 1916. In his inaugural speech mayor Lubormirski called on the elected City Councilors to work for the interest of the population without "distinction of status or religion".

Name	Curia	Profession	Affiliation
Zdzisław Lubomirski (Note: Lubomirski gave up his seat as he was elected as Mayor by the City Council, his seat was filled by Cels Fabiani)	I	Mayor	Central National Electoral Committee
Józef Prüffer	I	Engineer	Central National Electoral Committee
Adolf Suligowski	I	Lawyer	Central National Electoral Committee
Józef Zawadzki	I	Physician	Central National Electoral Committee
Marek Borkowski	I	Notary	Central National Electoral Committee
Leon Babiński	I	Physician	Central National Electoral Committee
Stefan Bystydzieński	I	Engineer	Central National Electoral Committee
Stanisław Libicki	I	Lawyer	Central Democratic Electoral Committee
Piotr Pręgowski	I	Physician	Central Democratic Electoral Committee
Stanisław Tarczyński	I	Chemist	Central Democratic Electoral Committee
Kazimierz Żukowski	I	Merchant	Central Democratic Electoral Committee
Jan Wanke	I	Estate owner	Central Democratic Electoral Committee
Edward Natanson	I	Engineer	Association of Jewish Voters
Lejzor-Luzer Prywes	I	Estate owner	Association of Jewish Voters
Rafał Szereszowski	I	Bank owner	Association of Jewish Voters
Piotr Drzewiecki (Note: Drzewiecki gave up his seat as he was elected as Deputy Mayor by the City Council, his seat was filled by Wacław Kirszrot)	II	Engineer	Central National Electoral Committee
Stanisław Karpiński	II	Bank director	Central National Electoral Committee
Feliks Pawłowski	II	Merchant	Central National Electoral Committee
Antoni Rząd	II	Physician	Central National Electoral Committee
Edward Geisler	II	Industrialist	Central National Electoral Committee
Antoni Wysocki	II	Director at K. Rudzki i S-ka	Central National Electoral Committee
Stanisław Gustaw Brun	II	Merchant	Central National Electoral Committee
Michał Łempicki	II	Engineer	Central Democratic Electoral Committee
Teodor Toeplitz	II	Industrialist	Central Democratic Electoral Committee
Stanisław Śliwiński	II	Engineer	Central Democratic Electoral Committee
Stanisław Patek	II	Lawyer	Central Democratic Electoral Committee
Cezary Łagiewski	II	Economist	Central Democratic Electoral Committee
Bolesław Eiger	II	Industrialist	Association of Jewish Voters
Leon-Lejbus Dawidsohn	II	Merchant	Association of Jewish Voters
Szyja-Heszel Farbstein	II	Merchant	Association of Jewish Voters
Kazimierz Leon Bączkiewicz	III (I)	Roman Catholic Priest	
Zygmunt Makowiecki	III (II)	Lawyer	
Wacław Makowski	III (II)	Lawyer	Central Democratic Electoral Committee
Ignacy Baliński	III (II)	Lawyer	Central National Electoral Committee
Józef Brudziński	III (III)	Rector of the University of Warsaw	
Michał Archichowski	III (III)	Teacher	
Józef Stypiński	III (III)	Teacher	Central Democratic Electoral Committee
Jan Rutkowski	III (IV)	Pharmacist	
Witold Chodźko	III (IV)	Physician	Central Democratic Electoral Committee
Kazimierz Chełchowski	III (IV)	Physician	Central National Electoral Committee
Henryk Korwin-Krukowski	III (V)	Engineer and Assistant Professor	
Franciszek Lilpop	III (V)	Architect	
Antoni Ponikowski	III (V)	Engineer	Central Democratic Electoral Committee
Bolesław Koskowski	III (VI)	Publicist	Central National Electoral Committee
Artur Śliwiński	III (VI)	Writer	Central Democratic Electoral Committee
Stanisław Lipczyński	IV	Engraver	Central National Electoral Committee
Ignacy Rupiewicz	IV	Industrialist	Central National Electoral Committee
Antoni Hurkiewicz	IV	Printer	Central National Electoral Committee
Konrad Ilski	IV	PhD in Social Sciences	Central National Electoral Committee
Antoni Mencel	IV	Locksmith foreman	Central National Electoral Committee
Aleksander de Rosset	IV	Engineer	Central National Electoral Committee
Kazimierz Wąsowicz	IV	Bricklayer foreman	Central National Electoral Committee
Wincenty Sikorski	IV	Taylor foreman	Central Democratic Electoral Committee
Ludwik Zieliński	IV	Merchant	Central Democratic Electoral Committee
Seweryn Świecki	IV	Shoemaker	Central Democratic Electoral Committee
Adolf Weisblat	IV	Engineer	Association of Jewish Voters
Salomon Seidenman	IV	Lawyer	Association of Jewish Voters
Juliusz Mutermilch	IV	Physician	Association of Jewish Voters
Leon Berenson	IV	Lawyer	Association of Jewish Voters
Abram Adolf Truskier	IV	Industrialist	Association of Jewish Voters
Konrad Czerwiński	V	Trader	Central National Electoral Committee
Wacław Łypacewicz	V	Lawyer	Central National Electoral Committee
Władysław Piechowski	V	Lawyer	Central National Electoral Committee
Czesław Brzeziński	V	Lawyer	Central National Electoral Committee
Władysław Kwasieborski	V	Engineer	Central National Electoral Committee
Marjan Zbrowski	V	Lawyer	Central National Electoral Committee
Wacław Sieroszewski	V	Writer	Central Democratic Electoral Committee
Ludomir Grendyszyńsk	V	Writer	Central Democratic Electoral Committee
Eugeniusz Śmiarowski	V	Lawyer	Central Democratic Electoral Committee
Lucyan Kobyłecki	V	Bank clerk	Central Democratic Electoral Committee
Marjan Grotowski	V	Teacher	Central Democratic Electoral Committee
Jan Rogowicz	V	Architect	Central Democratic Electoral Committee
Samuel Abraham Poznański	V	Rabbi	Association of Jewish Voters
Samuel Goldflam	V	Physician	Association of Jewish Voters
Joel Wegmeister	V	Merchant	Association of Jewish Voters
Tomasz Arciszewski	VI	Chairman of the Metal Workers Trade Union	List I – PPS-Frakcja
Gustaw Daniłowski	VI	Writer	List I – PPS-Frakcja
Jan Kronberg	VI	Leather Industry Workers Trade Union leader (Note: Jan Kronberg (1886–1922) was listed as Garbarz by the electoral authorities, but 'Garbarz' was his party name. He was arrested in November 1916 and exiled to Havelberg and Modlin.)	List II – SDKPiL
Józef Ciszewski	VI	Engineer	List III – PPS-Lewica
Noach Pryłucki	VI	Lawyer and editor	List IV – Folkskomitet
Benjamin Efron	VI	Engineer	List IV – Folkskomitet
Samuel Hirszhorn	VI	Editor	List IV – Folkskomitet
Abram Eisenberg	VI	Sculptor	List IV – Folkskomitet
Michał Lustański	VI	Journeyman brewer	List V – National Workers Committee
Stanisław Tymiński	VI	Shoemaker	List V – National Workers Committee
Stanisław Nowodworski	VI	Lawyer	List V – National Workers Committee
Jan Karol Szczeblewski	VI	Publicist	List V – National Workers Committee
Edmund Bernatowicz	VI	Chiseler	List V – National Workers Committee
Ludwik Śliwiński	VI	Locksmith	List V – National Workers Committee
Józef Szyc	VI	Saddler	List V – National Workers Committee

Alternate members elected from the Sixth Curia election included Ludwik Gdyk (List V), Norbert Barlicki (PPS-Frakcja), Władysław Kowalski (SDKPiL), Franciszek Truskier (SDKPiL) and Lucjan Rudnicki (SDKPiL).
