= 1917 Łódź City Council election =

Election in occupied Poland during WWI

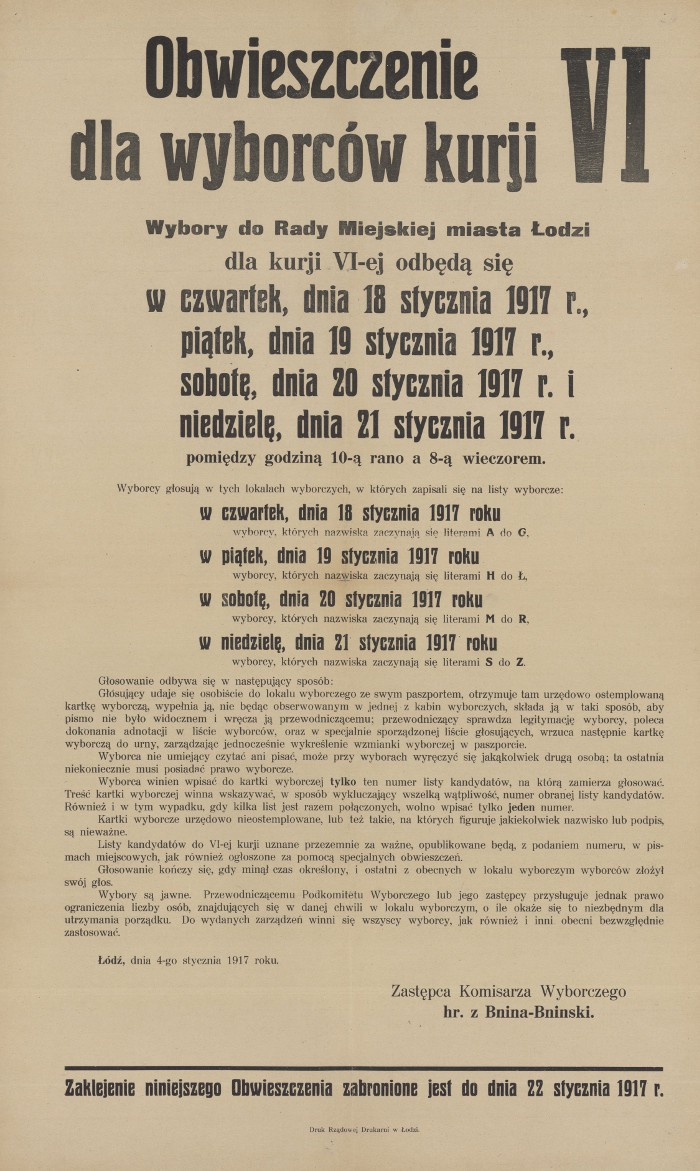
Poster issued by the Deputy Election Commissar Bnin-Bniński, with instructions for Sixth Curia voters

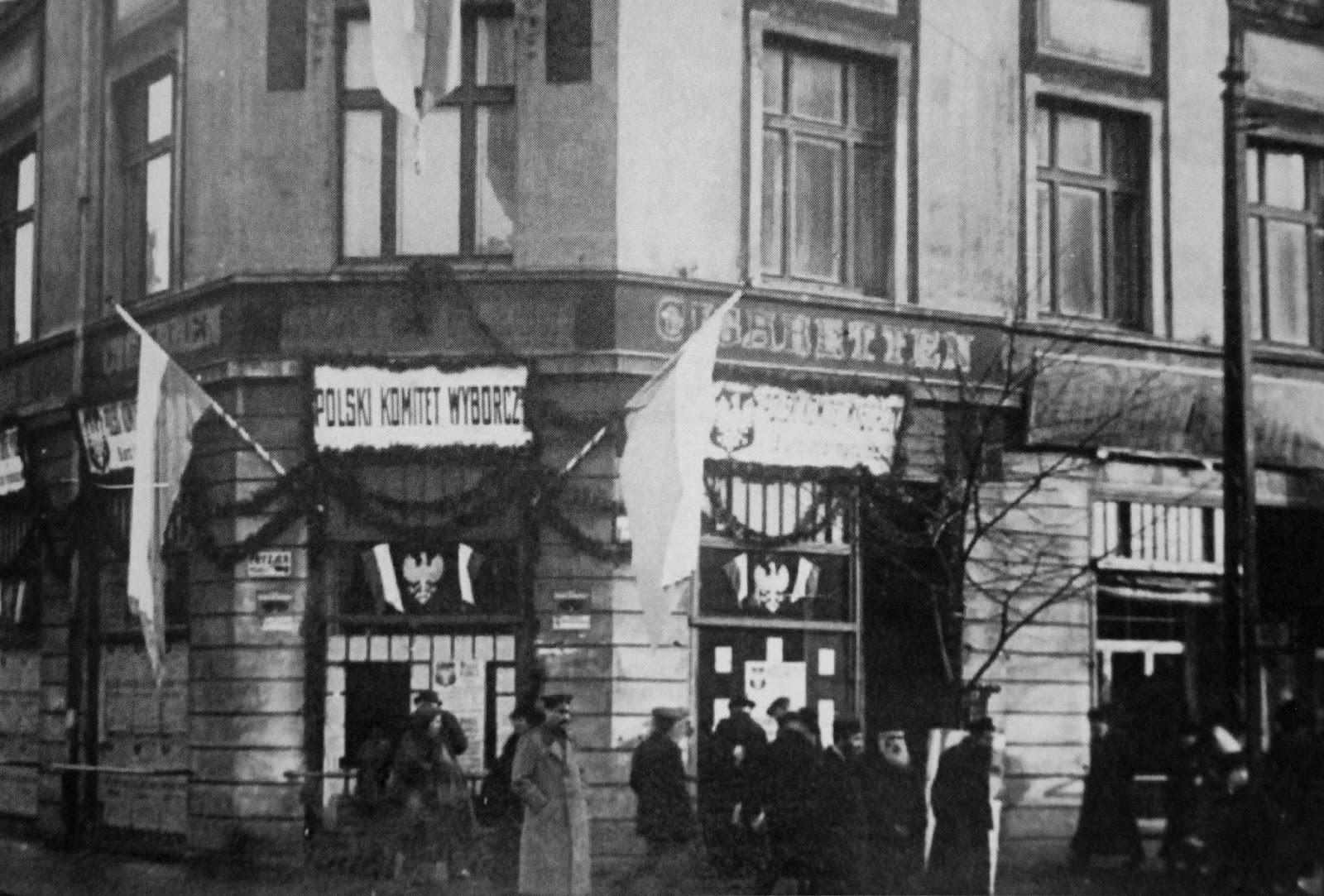
Polish Electoral Committee office, located at the corner of Piotrkowska Street and Przejazd Street

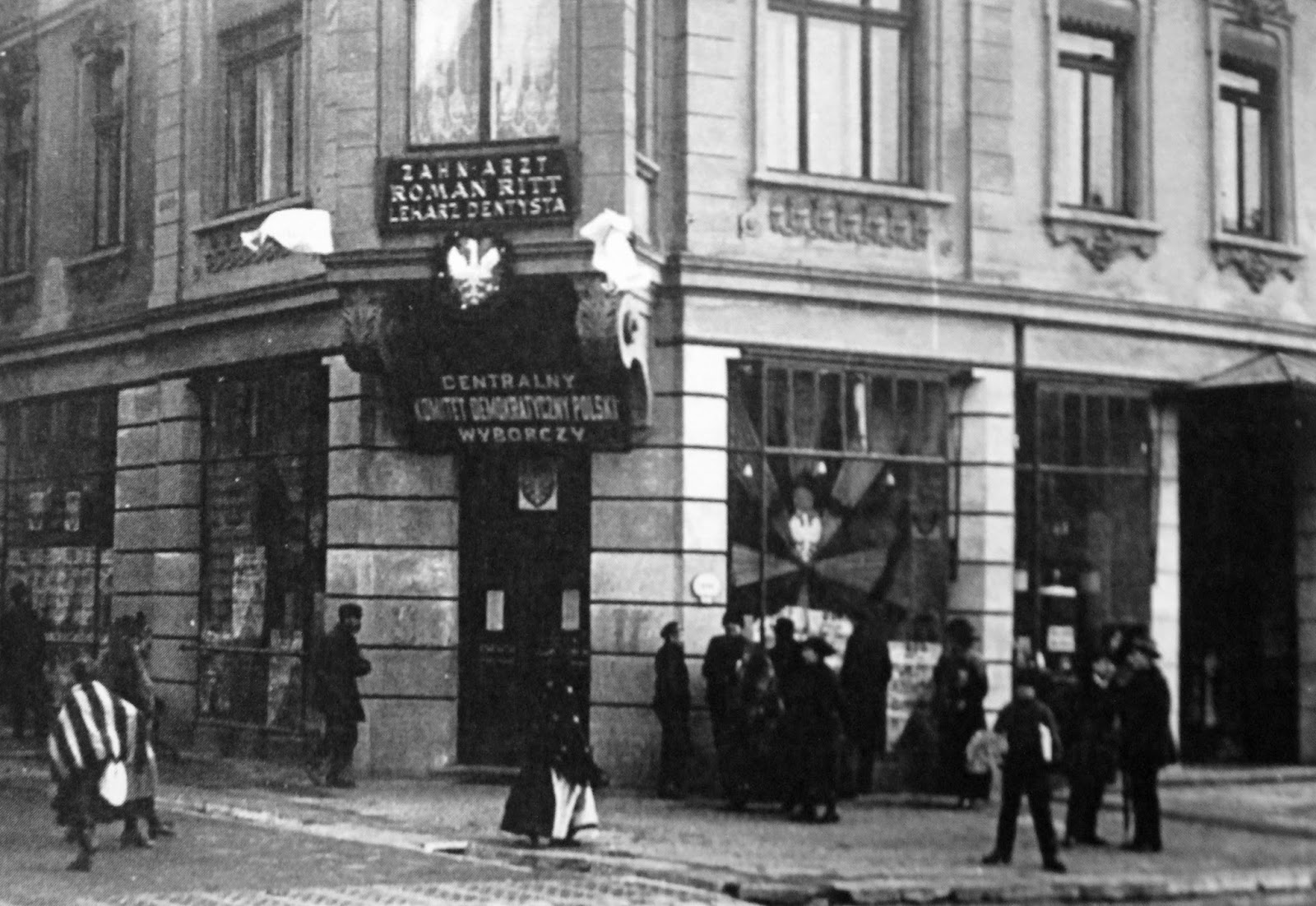
Central Polish Democratic Electoral Committee office, located at the corner of Piotrkowska Street and Nawrot Street

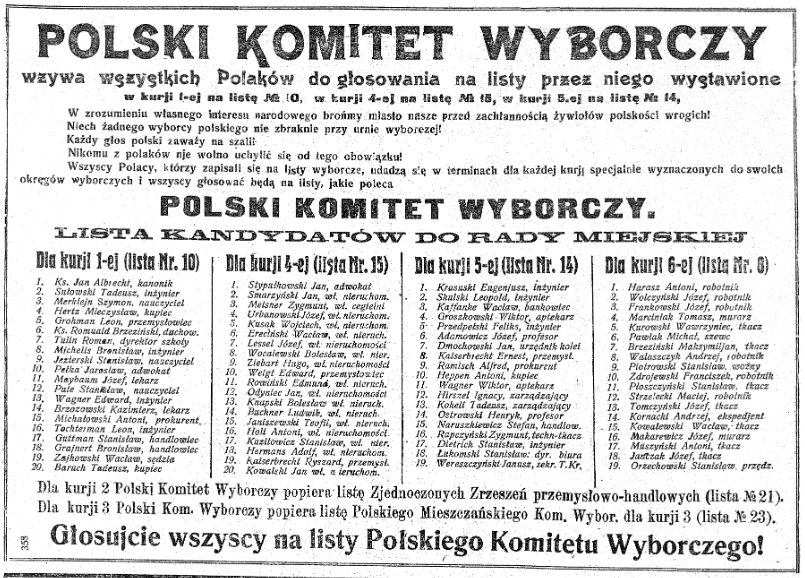
PKW advert in Gazeta Łódzka, calling on voters to vote for different lists for the six different curiae

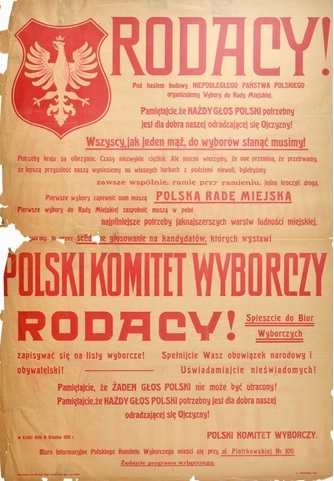
Polish Electoral Committee campaign poster

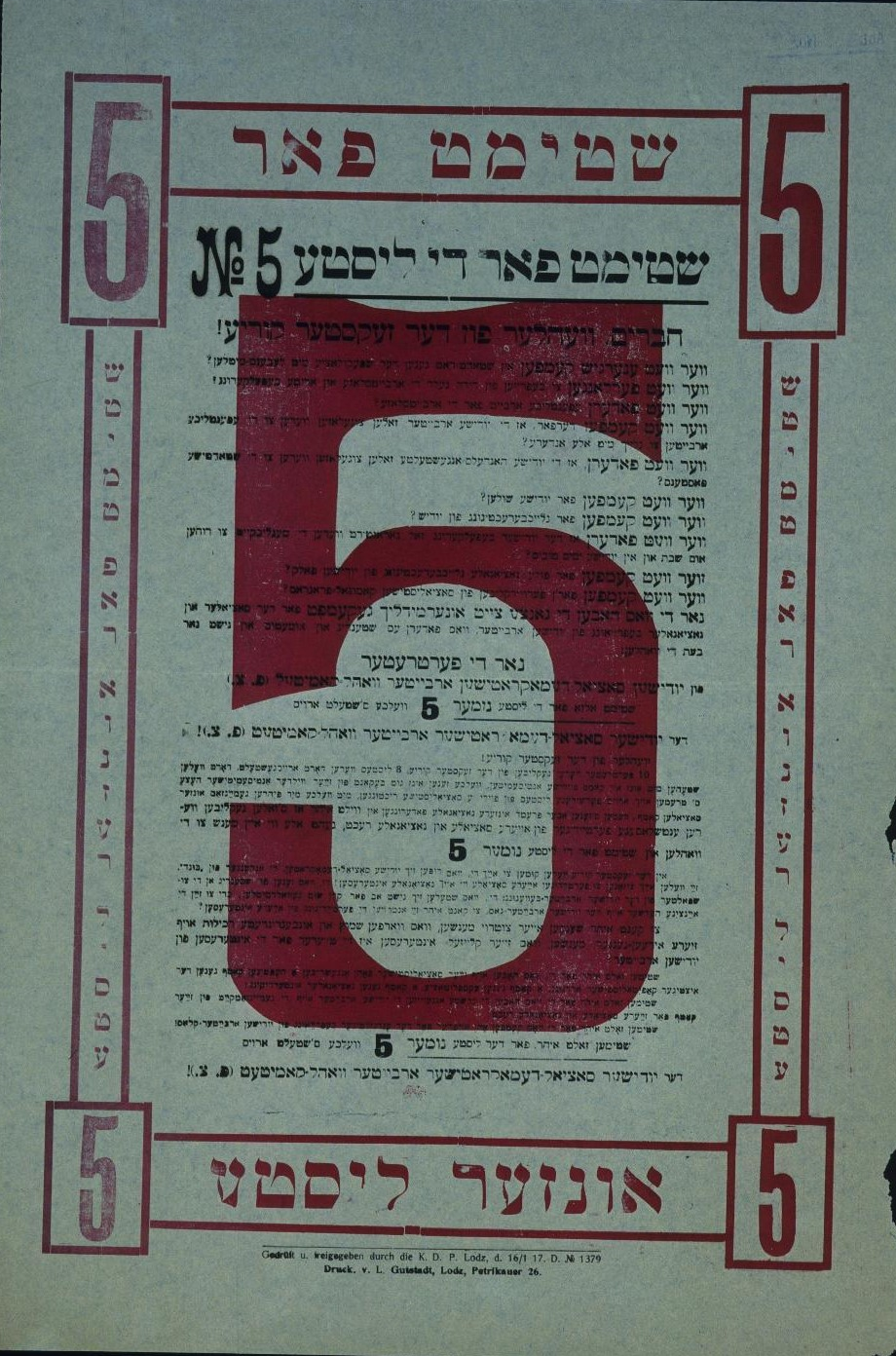
"Vote for Our List" – campaign poster for the Jewish Social Democratic Workers Electoral Committee (Poale Sion)

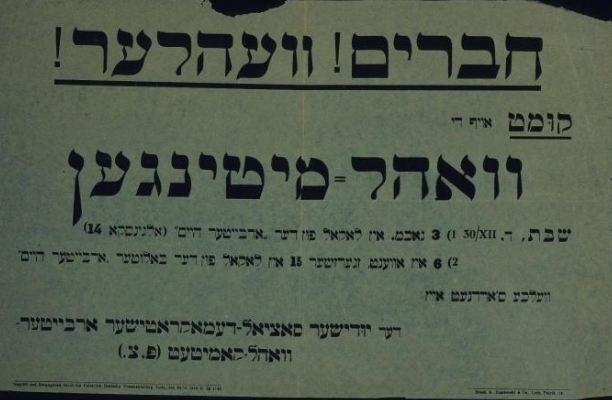
"Comrades! Voters!" – Jewish Social Democratic Workers Electoral Committee (Poale Sion) poster inviting the public to attend campaign meetings on December 30, 1916

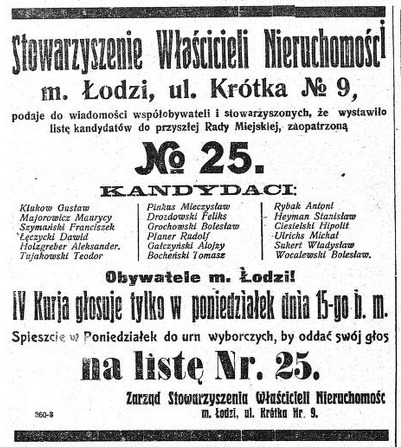
Advert for List 25 in the Fourth Curia, published in Gazeta Łódzka

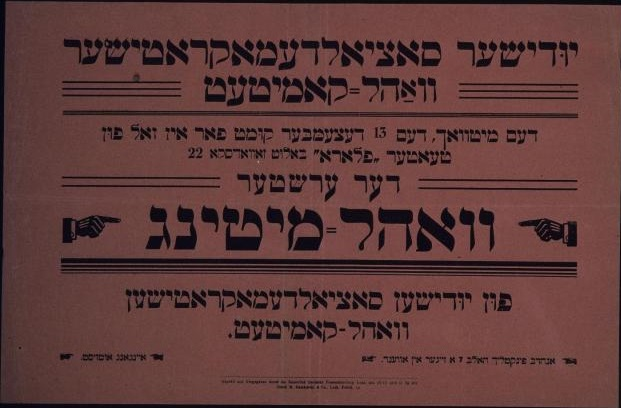
Poster calling for attendance of the first meeting of the Jewish Social Democratic Electoral Committee at the Flora theatre on December 13, 1916

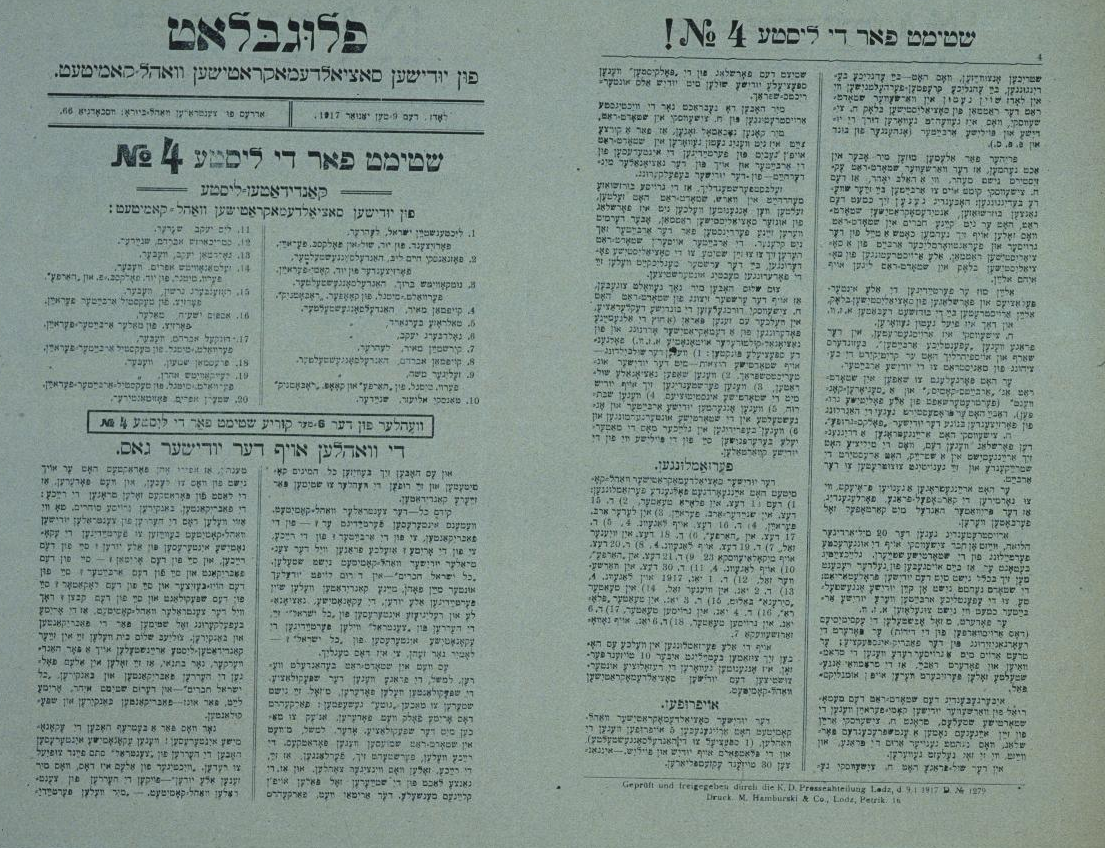
Bundist leaflet calling for a vote for List 4 in the Sixth Curia

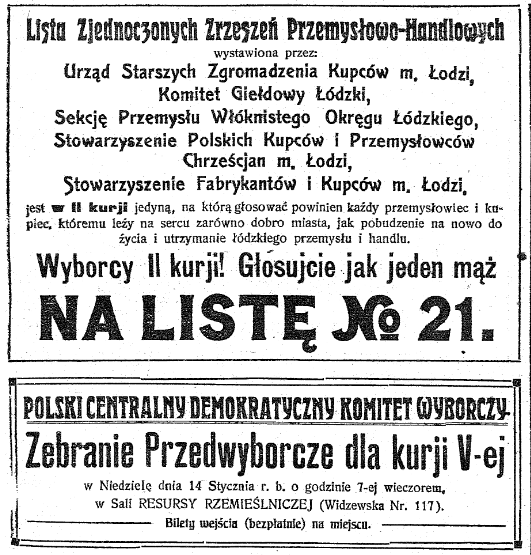
Adverts in Gazeta Łódzka, the upper one calling for a vote for List 21 in the Second Curia. The second advert invites Fifth Curia voters to attend a meeting of the Polish Central Democratic Electoral Committee.

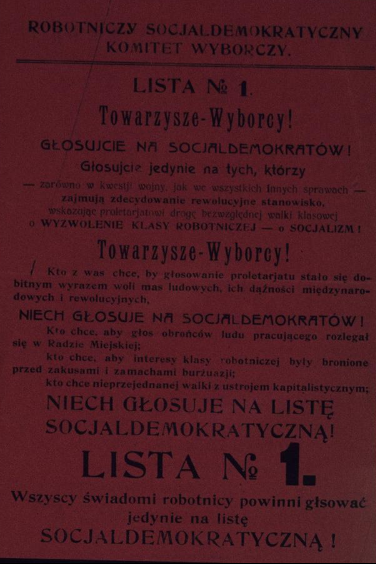
Social Democratic Electoral Committee poster

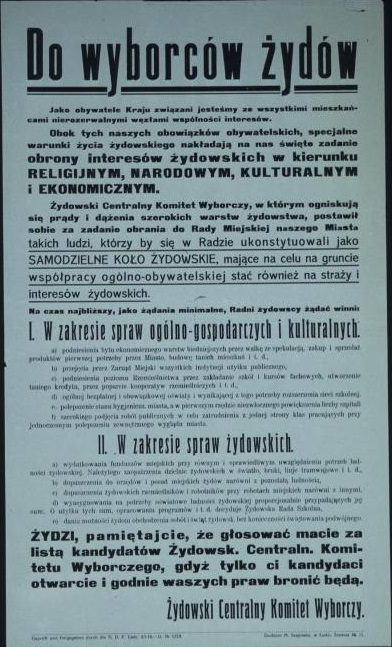
Jewish Central Electoral Committee poster in Polish language

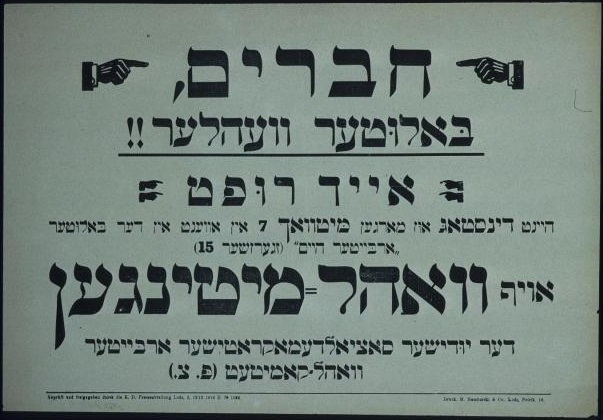
Leaflet of the Jewish Social Democratic Workers Electoral Committee (Poale Sion) inviting to a campaign meeting at the Workers House in Bałuty

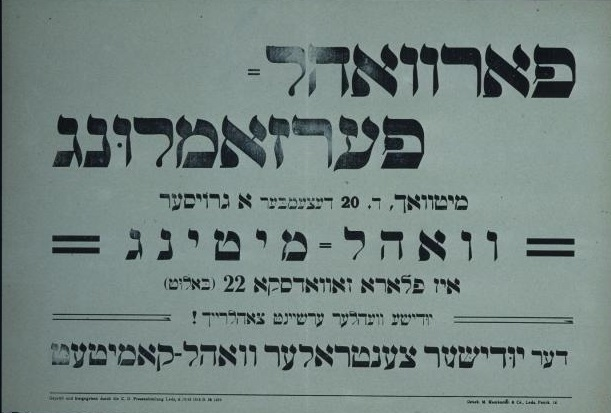
Jewish Central Electoral Committee poster calling for voters to attend a meeting at the Flora theatre in Bałuty on December 20, 1916

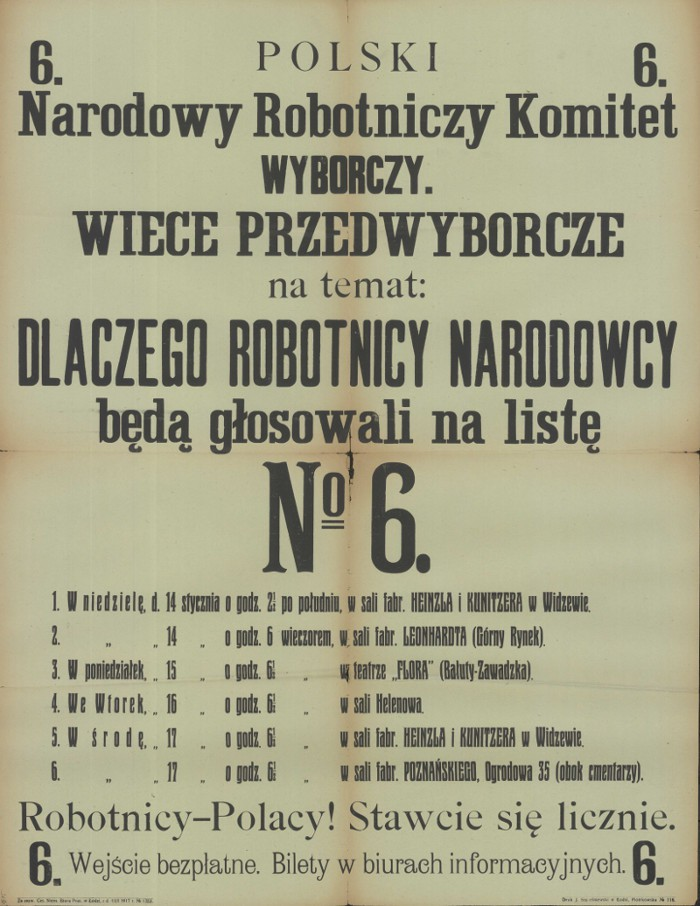
Propaganda poster for the Sixth Curia list of the National Workers Electoral Committee

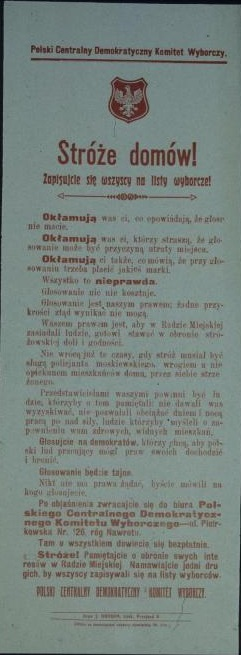
"Watchmen! Everyone register to vote at the Lodz City Council election" – PCDKW poster calling for registration of voters

Elections to the Łódź City Council in Poland were held in January 1917, under German occupation and in the midst of World War I. The elections were organized by the German occupation authorities who applied an electoral system of unequal curiae. The election produced a City Council in which neither the Polish nor Jewish blocs held majority, with the German councilors tipping the balance. According to Hofmann (2021) "the election campaign called forth a plethora of political groups that corresponded to the complex social, ethnic, and confessional divisions of the city", aggravating urban tensions in Łódź.

== Background ==
The 1917 Łódź City Council election was the first local election held in the city since 1863. The Łódź City Council election followed a similar election held in Warsaw in mid-1916. Across Congress Poland the retreat of Russian forces in 1914 had produced a power vacuum in local governance. Citizens Committees emerged to fill the gaps and provide a sort of municipal governance. However, after the issuing of the June 19, 1915 municipal law by the German occupation authorities, new City Councils and Magistrates began taking over the functions of municipal governance on the left bank of the Vistula river from July 1, 1915. In Łódź Heinrich Schoppen was appointed city mayor. During the period of 1915-1916 socialist parties, such as the General Jewish Labour Bund, organized protests calling for a democratic city government. Dawid Szwarcman, the leader the campaign, was persecuted by the German occupation authorities.

On November 1, 1916, the German Governor-General Hans Hartwig von Beseler issued an ordinance for municipal elections in the cities of the Government General of Warsaw. In Łódź, immediately following this announcement, the different political groupings immediately began setting up electoral committees and preparations for an electoral campaign were under way.

== Electoral system and preparations ==
Just like in the mid-1916 Warsaw City Council election, the German occupation authorities divided the Łódź voters into six curiae. The curiae system guaranteed a majority for wealthiest segments, an arrangement that the German occupation authorities hoped would ensure a friendly city administration. But the organization of the curiae was slightly different compared to the Warsaw election — First Curia gathered the intellectuals, the Second Curia the representatives of heavy industry and big business, the Third Curia the lower tier of merchants and craftsmen, the Fourth Curia consisted of property owners, the Fifth Curia gathered payers of housing tax and the Sixth Curia was the general category gathering the working class of the city.

On December 3, 1916, the Łódź Police Presidium set up under German control announced the appointment of Captain Harbig as the Łódź City Election Commissar and Count Bnin-Bniński as the Deputy Election Commissar. Harbig constituted an Election Commission consisting of Dr. A. Tomaszewski, Rabbi Mojzesz Eliasz Halpern, Stanisław Jarociński (banker), Karol Steinert (industrialist), E. Ereciński (artisan), Dr. J. Lewin, A. Vogel (lawyer), M. Manteuffel (bank director), Adolf Eichler (publicist), Eugeniusz Krasuski (engineer), Antoni Harasz (worker) and Izrael Schwarzman (civil registrar).

On December 4, 1916, Harbig and Bnin-Bniński announced that electoral rolls would be prepared between December 9 and 22, 1916. On December 5, 1916, a listing of 24 electoral district offices was published. The First Curia (intellectuals) was not divided geographically into electoral districts, but would instead all vote at the main Electoral Commission site on Spacerowa Street 14. By December 22, 1916, a total of 32,127 voters had registered — 778 in the First Curia (intellectuals), 568 in the Second Curia (industrialists and businessmen), 6,459 in the Third Curia (smaller merchants and artisans), 3,224 in the Fourth Curia (property owners), 3,442 in the Fifth Curia (payers of housing tax) and 17,656 in the Sixth Curia (working class). It was estimated that some 48,000 people in the city would have been entitled to register to vote, meaning that about two-thirds of the potential voters had registered. There was a lower degree of voters registration in the Fourth Curia (property owners), as the German authorities requested to see receipts of tax payments to register voters in that curia.

== Committees in the fray ==
Once the Łódź election had been announced the different political groups of the city began assembling electoral committees to contest the polls.

=== Polish committees ===
The two main Polish groups were the Polish Electoral Committee (PKW) and the Central Polish Democratic Electoral Committee (PCDKW). The former adopted an approach of neutrality in the war between Germany and Russia, the latter had an 'activist' approach calling for cooperation with the Central Powers for the sake of obtaining Polish independence. PKW was formed by the National Democrats. Compared with Warsaw, the National Democrats were politically stronger in Łódź. The PKW announced its electoral manifesto on December 7, 1916, and the PCDKW issued theirs on December 14, 1916. The other Polish electoral committees aligned themselves with either the PKW or the PCDKW.

In the working-class Sixth Curia the counter-parts of the Polish committees were the Polish Central Workers Electoral Committee (PCKRW) organized by Christian Democrats and the National Workers Electoral Committee. The National Workers Electoral Committee was set up by the National Workers Union (NZR) and the Polish Trade Unions (PZZ), and confronted both the socialist candidatures and, notably, the National Democratic-Christian Democratic bloc.

Contesting independently from the Polish committees, the Radical-Democratic Electoral Committee was organized by the 'Poles of Mosaic faith'.

=== German committee ===
Łódź had a large ethnic German population, with about a fifth of the inhabitants being Germans it had been one of the largest urban German communities in the Russian Empire. As of 1916 the Łódź Germans were divided into two political groupings. There has the 'passivists', which were supported by the wealthy industrialists of the city. And then there was a nationalist movement, organized into the German Association for Lodz and Surroundings founded in March 1916 and led by Adolf Eichler. The German nationalists had the support of the police chief of Łódź Matthias von Oppen. Notably von Oppen had proposed that a system of separate national curiae be implemented for the Łódź election, which would have guaranteed the Germans a certain number of seats.

But the two rival German groupings joined forces ahead of the election and formed a single bloc, the United German Electoral Committee. On December 10, 1916, a German mass rally was held at the Łódź Men's Choral Society grounds with Eichler as the main speaker. The event gathered some 2,000-3,000 people. The resolution read out at the meeting stated that the Łódź Germans accepted the said Act of November 5 but asked that the German Imperial government safeguard interests of the Germans in Poland. The newspaper Deutsche Lodzer Zeitung supported the electoral campaign of the United German Electoral Committee.

=== Jewish committees ===
The main grouping among the Łódź Jews was the Jewish Central Electoral Committee, which originated from the Zionist movement and positioned itself as the defender and promoter of Jewish interests. The group called for the formation of a separate Jewish bloc in the City Council. The Jewish Central Electoral Committee ran an active campaign, even canvassing for votes at synagogues. The main leaders of the Jewish Central Electoral Committee were Jerzy Rosenblatt, Salomon Budzyner and Dawid Rabinowicz.

Another smaller Jewish committee, the Committee of Poles-Jews, was set up by the assimilationists. The Committee of Poles-Jews could count on a handful of skilled organizers, most notably Dr. Józef Sachs and Stanisław Jarociński. Whilst the Committee of Poles-Jews suffered fierce pressure from both Polish and Jewish sectors, they maintained a conciliatory discourse. In the Polish press the Committee of Poles-Jews was condemned for organizing separately from the Polish committees, whilst Zionists broke up their campaign meetings and bullied their representatives as traitors of the Jewish cause. On December 21, 1916, the Jewish assimilationists held a rally at which large rowdy crowd showed up and heckled the speakers as traitors.

Other Jewish committees being organized to contest the election were the Electoral Committee of Orthodox Jews, the Electoral Committee of Jewish Teachers and the Electoral Committee of Jewish Craftsmen.

=== Socialist committees ===
Five socialist committees would compete for the working class votes in the Sixth Curia – the Electoral Committee of Polish Socialists, the Electoral Committee of Polish Left Socialists, the Social Democratic Electoral Committee, the Jewish Social Democratic Electoral Committee and the Jewish Social Democratic Workers Electoral Committee (Poale Sion). The socialist committees would spend much of their energy and attention during the election campaign squabbling between each other.

==== Polish Left Socialist Electoral Committee ====
Among the socialist committees, the Polish Left Socialist Electoral Committee ran the most extensive electoral campaign. Its candidate list, List 2, had 20 Polish Socialist Party – Left (PPS-Lewica) party members as its candidates. It could rely on the support from the newspaper Głos Robotniczy, which was published in Warsaw but distributed in Łódź. The Polish Left Socialist Electoral Committee had sought to form a pre-electoral pact with the Bund and SDKPiL, but such a united bloc never materialized. Głos Robotniczy blamed SDKPiL for the failure of the electoral pact. The leader of PPS-Lewica in Łódź was Ignacy Gralak. PPS-Lewica propaganda leaflets denounced that women were not allowed to vote and labelled the electoral ordinance imposed by the German occupation authorities as undemocratic. The PPS-Lewica propaganda denounced the National Democrats and Christian Democrats as the representatives of the capitalists, clergy and nobility, that under Czarist rule they had instigated pogroms and repressed the labour movement. The PPS-Lewica likewise denounced the NZR for instigating conflicts between workers, the Polish Central Democratic Electoral Committee for striving to establish a dictatorship and the PPS-Frakcja as false friends of the working class. In regards to the SDKPiL, PPS-Lewica had some differences on the question of national independence.

The Polish Left Socialist Electoral Committee campaign raised demands for 8-hour working day, minimum wages, cancellation of rent arrears for workers in the context of the ongoing war, secular educational system and linguistic rights for national minorities. The Polish Left Socialist Electoral Committees organized mass rallies, where their leaders gave speeches on ideological questions and then opened up for debates.

==== Electoral Committee of Polish Socialists ====
The Polish Socialist Party – Revolutionary Faction (PPS-Frakcja), i.e. the other grouping that had emerged from the split in the Polish Socialist Party, organized the Electoral Committee of Polish Socialists which ran an active electoral campaign. They had 21 candidates on their list. The main leaders of this committee were Aleksy Rżewski, M. Bieniak and R. Kotasiński. The Electoral Committee of Polish Socialists held some 30 electoral meetings, and received a number of party leaders from Warsaw to speak at their events (such as Witold Jodko-Narkiewicz, Tomasz Arciszewski and Norbert Barlicki). They also had the support of the newspaper Nowy Kurier Łódzki. The Electoral Committee of Polish Socialists also included the Workers Opposition of PPS-Lewica, a Łódź-based dissident faction of PPS-Lewica led by Antoni Szczerkowski. This faction supported building an independent Polish democratic republic, and was thus programmatically close to PPS-Frakcja.

The Electoral Committee of Polish Socialists was approached by the Polish Central Workers Electoral Committee (PCKRW), who asked they unite into a single list. The PPS-Frakcja rejected the invitation, instead appealing to the PCKRW to withdraw its candidate list as well as denouncing the influence of National Democrats on the PCKRW. Visa-vi the other socialist groups, PPS-Frakcja stressed that socialists should struggle for Polish independence first and that workers and peasants issues would be resolved after independence. At the PPS-Frakcja campaign meetings the PPS-Lewica and SDKPiL were repeatedly denounced, even playing on antisemitic tropes. At a meeting of tram workers in Helenów Rżewski argued that "PPS-Lewica is a Jewish party and can be recognized from afar by their robes".

==== Social Democratic Electoral Committee ====
The Social Democracy of the Kingdom of Poland and Lithuania (SDKPiL) launched its Social Democratic Electoral Committee on December 13, 1916. The SDKPiL candidature for the Sixth Curia was List 1, which carried 20 names (ten ordinary candidates, ten alternate candidates). The top candidates of List 1 were Abel Kapota, Władysław Zajdel, Antoni (Edmund?) Wawrzyński and Józef Krawczyński (Kawczyński). Among the twenty names there were 11 textile workers, 2 bakers, 1 shoemaker, 1 tinsmith, 2 workers without a specific profession, 1 salesman, 1 musician and 1 intellectual (Kapota).

The Social Democratic Electoral Committee presented a broad program promoting working class causes and demanding democratization of local governance. But the Social Democratic Electoral Committee campaign did not include demands for national independence. The group argued during the campaign that both national oppression and class oppression would only be defeated by international revolutionary struggle. This position would become the greatest limitation for the SDKPiL to reach a mass appeal in this election. Moreover, SDKPiL lacked skilled speakers in Łódź, only Kapota was a good orator among the local leaders. The Łódź election campaign was assisted by Szymański from the central party leadership. The party did not have a strong industrial working-class presence in the city, and its base was more concentrated among traders and craftsmen.

The Social Democratic Electoral Committee organized some ten-twenty campaign rallies at factory halls and theatres and issued a number of leaflets. For example, on December 18, 1916, the Social Democratic Electoral Committee organized a campaign rally in the hall of the Leonhardt factory, with the participation of hundreds of workers. Speakers at the rally included Szymański (who positioned his party as the sole defender of the interests of the proletariat, and called for struggle against reformism), Kapota and Kawczyński.

==== Bund and Poale-Sion ====
As the Jewish Central Electoral Committee did not present any candidates for the Sixth Curia, the two socialist parties Poale Sion and the Bund were the sole Jewish lists seeking the working-class vote. As for the Jewish Social Democratic Workers Electoral Committee (Poale Sion), Tadeusz (1966) argues that little archival material remains regarding their activities and programme.

The Jewish Social Democratic Electoral Committee of the Bund was launched on December 10, 1916. The Bund conducted an extensive election campaign. The local Bundist leadership included Izrael Lichtenstein, D. Szwarcman, Polak, A. Zelmanowicz, Baumgarten and Morgental. Local Bundist A. Zelmanowicz would later claim that the Bund committee organized some 40 election meetings, but Tadeusz (1966) finds that estimate inflated. Campaign activities were concentrated in the areas of Jewish workers and artisans. The Bundist electoral campaign had its epicentre in Bałuty. A number of leaders from the Bund Central Committee arrived in the city to assist the organization the electoral campaign and speaking at campaign meetings, including Vladimir Medem, Gershon Zybert and Izaak Pejsachsohn.

The Jewish Social Democratic Electoral Committee demanded that the Łódź City Council set-up Yiddish-language schools, the right to use Yiddish in interaction with all municipal government bodies, setting up health care activities in Jewish working-class areas and that the City Council should employ Jewish workers for public work projects and Jewish civil servants. In describing their opponents, the Bundist propaganda labelled the non-socialist Jewish committees as hiding their 'true class face and, under nationalist, chauvinistic and clerical slogans' whilst condemning the Poale Sion as diverting the Jewish proletariat from the path of international brotherhood and "spreading distrust and hatred between Jewish and non-Jewish workers by claiming that a Jewish worker is a foreigner-guest in Poland".

== Pre-electoral negotiations and candidate lists ==
On December 22, 1916, Harbig called for the submission of candidate lists between December 23, 1916, and January 1, 1917. But by December 30, 1916, most committees had not yet submitted their candidate lists, taking the ensuing New Year holiday into mind, Harbig postponed the deadline to January 2, 1917.

Negotiations were taking place between the Polish, German and Jewish committees, trying to reach a consensus candidature. In the preceding 1916 Warsaw City Council election a pact had been reached between Polish and Jewish committees, whereby a consensus had been reached on repartition of seats in most of the curiae and no election were held in those curiae. The Polish, German and Jewish committees sought to reach a similar agreement in Łódź for the first five curiae, which would have meant avoiding a competitive election except for in the Sixth Curia. Official negotiations between the committees commenced on December 31, 1916, after a long process of informal consultations. The Polish committees were most enthusiastic about an agreement, as they foresaw that it would increase their share of seats compared to a competitive election. The Jewish committees were willing to make concessions, in the context of the prevailing antisemitic climate. However the United German Electoral Committee withdrew from the talks before the end of the day. The Germans had been offered just 4 seats, as compared to the 12 seats they were demanding. The Polish and Jewish committees continued the talks after the departure of the Germans. But the negotiations broke down just before the end of the deadline on January 2, 1917.

There were conflicting accounts as to why the talks had failed. Reportedly the Jewish committees had decided to accept an offer of 23 seats in the City Council (including the number Jews who would be elected from the Sixth Curia). One hypothesis was that neither side would accept having the ninth slot on the candidate lists, as it was presumed that the ninth slot candidate could be defeated by a German candidate. Another argument made from the Jewish side was that their grassroots reportedly had threatened vote against a compromise list. A third argument was presented in Nowy Kurier Łódzki, which said that the Jewish nationalists had rejected the presence of candidates from the Poles of Mosaic faith on the compromise lists. All in all 33 candidate lists representing 17 committees were submitted.

As the rupture of the talks occurred in the last minute, the Electoral Committee of Orthodox Jews was unable to submit its candidate lists in time. Unable to have their own candidates, the Electoral Committee of Orthodox Jews would call on their supporters to vote for the candidates of the Jewish Central Electoral Committee. Only two committees utilized the option to field joint lists (contesting separately, but being able to combine their vote tallies), the Electoral Committee of Jewish Teachers and the Radical-Democratic Electoral Committee which contested the First Curia jointly.

Committees and the candidate lists in the 1917 Łódź City Council election
Committee		Curia					
Committee		I	II	III	IV	V	VI
Aligned with the Polish Electoral Committee	Polish Electoral Committee (National Democracy)	check			check	check	
Aligned with the Polish Electoral Committee	Polish Central Workers Electoral Committee						check
Aligned with the Polish Electoral Committee	Electoral Committee of 5 Industrial and Trade Associations		check				
Aligned with the Polish; Central Democratic; Electoral Committee	Polish Central Democratic Electoral Committee	check			check	check	
Aligned with the Polish; Central Democratic; Electoral Committee	National Workers Electoral Committee (National Workers Union)						check
Aligned with the Polish; Central Democratic; Electoral Committee	Electoral Committee of Polish Townsfolk			check			
Radical-Democratic Electoral Committee		check				check	
Jewish committees	Jewish Central Electoral Committee	check	check	check	check	check	
Jewish committees	Committee of Orthodox Jews						
Jewish committees	Committee of Poles-Jews		check	check		check	
Jewish committees	Electoral Committee of Jewish Teachers	check					
Jewish committees	Electoral Committee of Jewish Craftsmen			check			
United German Electoral Committee		check	check	check	check	check	check
Socialist committees	Jewish Social Democratic Workers Electoral Committee (Poale-Sion)						check
Socialist committees	Polish Left Socialist Electoral Committee (PPS-Lewica)						check
Socialist committees	Jewish Social Democratic Electoral Committee (Bund)						check
Socialist committees	Electoral Committee of Polish Socialists (PPS-Frakcja)						check
Socialist committees	Social Democratic Electoral Committee (SDKPiL)						check

== Voting ==
Voting for the First Curia occurred on January 15 and 16, 1916. The Second and Fourth Curiae voted on January 15, 1916. The Third Curia voted on January 16, 1915. The Fifth Curia voted on January 17, 1916. The voting of the Sixth Curia took place between January 18 and 21, 1916. There was high turn-out, around 94% participation in the First Curia, 91% in the Second, 77% in the Third, 73% in the Fourth, 75% in the Fifth and around 80% in the Sixth.

The voting looked very different in different curiae. For the First and Second curiae, there were no agitations around the polling centres. When the Third Curia voted, the Łódź press noted that the Jewish Central Electoral Committee distributed leaflets and candidate lists to voters enter the polling stations whilst both the Jewish Central Electoral Committee and the Committee of Poles-Jews had campaigners walking the streets bearing signs with their list numbers. The National Democratic committee was noted for giving away free soup to voters.

The most fierce activity took place around the voting of the Sixth Curia. Campaigners besieged polling centres and pressured voters to take their leaflets and candidate lists. The Łódź press noted that even women were present among the agitators outside the polling centres. The electoral committees would track down absent voters at their residences and bring them to the polling stations.

== Results ==
The final results were announced on January 26, 1917. In terms of the combined popular vote, the socialist committees obtained 31.12% of the votes, the (non-socialist) Jewish committees obtained 23.99% of the votes, the Polish Electoral Committee and its allies ('passivists') obtained 17.70% of the votes, the Central Polish Democratic Electoral Committee and its allies ('activists') obtained 15.01% of the votes, the United German Electoral Committee obtained 10.97% of the votes and the Radical-Democratic Electoral Committee ('Poles of Mosaic faith') obtained 1.19% of the votes. But due to the skewed curiae system imposed by the German occupation authorities, which gave 50 seats to the first five curiae which gathered 43.73% of the cast valid votes against 10 seats for the sixth working-class curia with 56.26% of the cast valid votes, the (non-socialist) Jewish committees obtained 40% of the seats in the Łódź City Council, the Polish passivists 23.33%, the Germans 13.33%, the Polish activists 11.67% and the Radical-Democrats 3.33%, whilst the socialists (who had obtained 31.12% of the votes) received merely 8.33% of the seats.

There was a relatively high turnout among the Jewish community in the election. Per Tadeusz (1966) this phenomenon could be explained by the fact that Jews were not affected by mobilization in the same manner as Poles and Germans and that had not migrated in large numbers to Germany or sought work in the country side. Moreover, the Jewish political organizations had a run well-organized agitation campaigns.

The Head of the Civil Administration of the General Government, Wolfgang von Kries felt vindicated after the election, arguing that the result reflected well the national composition of the city and noted that now the Germans would tip the balance as neither the Jewish nor Polish blocs held a majority in the new council.

For the socialists the election result was somewhat disappointing, considering that Łódź was considered the 'Polish Manchester'. Per Kaufmann (2015) "[t]he election result strong suggest that, in times of turmoil and uncertainty, class identity and its loyalties counted for little, and did not have the unifying power that nationalism did."

Result of the 1917 Łódź City Council election (all curiae combined)
Committee		Votes	%	Seats
Jewish committees	Jewish Central Electoral Committee	5,755	22.43%	21
Jewish committees	Committee of Poles-Jews	347	1.35%	2
Jewish committees	Electoral Committee of Jewish Teachers	54	0.21%	1
Jewish committees	Electoral Committee of Jewish Craftsmen	4	0.02%	0
Aligned with the Polish Electoral Committee	Polish Electoral Committee	1,450	5.65%	10
Aligned with the Polish Electoral Committee	Polish Central Workers Electoral Committee	2,967	11.65%	2
Aligned with the Polish Electoral Committee	Electoral Committee of 5 Industrial and Trade Associations	123	0.48%	2
United German Electoral Committee		2,814	10.97%	8
Aligned with the Polish; Central Democratic; Electoral Committee	Polish Central Democratic Electoral Committee	592	2.31%	3
Aligned with the Polish; Central Democratic; Electoral Committee	National Workers Electoral Committee	2,345	9.14%	2
Aligned with the Polish; Central Democratic; Electoral Committee	Electoral Committee of Polish Townsfolk	914	3.56%	2
Socialist committees	Jewish Social Democratic Workers Electoral Committee (Poale Sion)	2,545	9.92%	2
Socialist committees	Polish Left Socialist Electoral Committee	1,834	7.15%	1
Socialist committees	Jewish Social Democratic Electoral Committee	1,654	6.45%	1
Socialist committees	Electoral Committee of Polish Socialists	1,430	5.57%	1
Socialist committees	Social Democratic Electoral Committee	522	2.03%	0
Radical-Democratic Electoral Committee		306	1.19%	2
Total		25,656		60

Result of the 1st Curia (intellectuals) election in the 1917 Łódź City Council election
List	Votes	%	Seats	Elected council members
List 10 – Polish Electoral Committee	307	41.94%	5	Jan Albrecht, Tadeusz Sułowski, Szymon Merklejn, Mieczysław Hertz, Leon Grohman
List 22 – Polish Central Democratic Electoral Committee	149	20.35%	2	Henryk Trenkner, Antoni Tomaszewski
List 16 – United German Electoral Committee	109	14.89%	1	Henryk Bräutigam
List 11 – Radical-Democratic Electoral Committee	78	10.65%	1	Henryk Dylion
List 9 – Electoral Committee of Jewish Teachers	54	7.38%	1	Abraham Szwajcer
List 30 – Jewish Central Electoral Committee	35	4.78%	0	

Result of the 2nd Curia (industrialists and businessmen) election in the 1917 Łódź City Council election
List	Votes	%	Seats	Elected council members
List 27 – Jewish Central Electoral Committee	243	46.91%	5	Salomon Budzyner, Adolf Dobranicki, Majer Karpf, Salomon Kahan, Mendel Rosenberg
List 21 – Electoral Committee of 5 Industrial and Trade Associations	123	23.74%	2	Henryk Grohman, Maurycy Poznański
List 32 – Committee of Poles-Jews	93	17.95%	2	Józef Sachs, Stanisław Jarociński
List 17 – United German Electoral Committee	59	11.39%	1	Adolf Ziegler

Result of the 3rd Curia (small merchants and craftsmen) election in the 1917 Łódź City Council election
List	Votes	%	Seats	Elected council members
List 26 – Jewish Central Electoral Committee	3,510	70.30%	8	Jerzy Rosenblatt, Sergjusz Hoffman, Wolf Markusfeld, Alkon Russak, Szaja Uger, Izrael Lewin, Gerson Praszkier, Salomon Samet
List 23 – Electoral Committee of Polish Townsfolk	914	18.30%	2	Marjan Bawarski, Teodor Szybiłło
List 18 – United German Electoral Committee	412	8.25%	0	
List 34 – Committee of Poles-Jews	153	3.06%	0	
List 31 – Electoral Committee of Jewish Craftsmen	4	0.08%	0	

Result of the 4th Curia (real estate owners) election in the 1917 Łódź City Council election
List	Votes	%	Seats	Elected council members
List 19 – United German Electoral Committee	791	33.39%	4	Paweł (Paul) Sanne, Wilhelm Jess, August Gerhardt, Josef Spickermann
List 15 – Polish Electoral Committee	719	30.35%	3	Jan Stypułkowski (wydawca), Jan Smarzyński, Zygmunt Meisner
List 28 – Jewish Central Electoral Committee	589	24.86%	2	Moszek Helman, Moszek Russ
List 25 – Polish Central Democratic Electoral Committee	270	11.40%	1	Gustaw Klukow

Result of the 5th Curia (payers of housing tax) election in the 1917 Łódź City Council election
List	Votes	%	Seats	Elected council members
List 29 – Jewish Central Electoral Committee	1,378	52.82%	6	Dawid Rabinowicz, Józef Urysohn, Michał Jarblum, Ludwik Wein, Jakob Glücksmann, Chil Berman
List 14 – Polish Electoral Committee	424	16.25%	2	Eugeniusz Krasuski, Leopold Skulski
List 20 – United German Electoral Committee	305	11.69%	1	Juliusz Triebe
List 12 – Radical-Democratic Electoral Committee	228	8.74%	1	Jerzy Klocman
List 24 – Polish Central Democratic Electoral Committee	173	6.63%	0	
List 33 – Committee of Poles-Jews	101	3.87%	0	

Result of the 6th Curia (workers) election in the 1917 Łódź City Council election
List	Votes	%	Seats	Elected council members
List 8 – Polish Central Workers Electoral Committee	2,967	20.55%	2	Antoni Harasz, Józef Wolczyński
List 5 – Jewish Social Democratic Workers Electoral Committee (Poale Sion)	2,545	17.63%	2	Lew Holenderski, Dawid Rosenzweig
List 6 – National Workers Electoral Committee	2,345	16.24%	2	Andrzej Kaczmarek, Błażej Pokorski
List 2 – Polish Left Socialist Electoral Committee	1,838	12.73%	1	Ignacy Gralak
List 4 – Jewish Social Democratic Electoral Committee	1,654	11.46%	1	Izrael Lichtenstein
List 3 – Electoral Committee of Polish Socialists	1,430	9.90%	1	Aleksy Rżewski
List 13 – German Electoral Committee	1,133	7.84%	1	Herman Fiedler
List 1 – Social Democratic Electoral Committee	522	3.63%	0	

== Aftermath ==
The election result led to tensions in Łódź, both in terms of Polish-Jewish and Polish-German conflicts. Following the election the two main Polish blocs formed the Circle of Polish Councilors. This grouping was joined by the Committee of Poles Jews, the Radical Democrats and the PPS-Frakcja, thus gathering 26 of the 60 elected councilors. The left socialist councilor Ignacy Gralak rejected the invitation to join the Circle, stating that he was "a fighter for the international ideals of the proletariat" and could thus not join pacts with nationalist or bourgeois sectors.

The Circle of Polish Councilors refused to take their seats in the City Council, unless a series of their demands were met. The called for the appointment of a Polish mayor, that there would be lay judged recruited from local communities and that Polish would be the working language of the Magistrate and the City Council. Negotiations were held with the Jewish and German committees, but the talks did not bear fruit. Eventually the German authorities threatened the Polish councilors with hefty fines and 6 months of imprisonment unless they joined the City Council. A compromise was reached, whereby the Pole Leopold Skulski took office as the provisional mayor and Polish was made as working language of the City Council and Magistrate (with some exceptions).

On May 23, 1917, first session of the elected Łódź City Council was held, four months after the election was held. Tadeusz Sułowski was named chairman of the City Council, Leopold Skulski was elected mayor, and Maks Kernbaum was elected his deputy mayor. The Circle of Polish Councilors was the largest grouping in the City Council with their 26 seats, whilst the Jewish Central Electoral Committee with their 21 seats formed the many opposition bloc. At the political margins the PPS-Lewica deputy Gralak and the Bundist deputy Lichtenstein would cooperate with each other in the City Council.
