= Samuel Hirszhorn =

Jewish Polish writer, journalist and politician

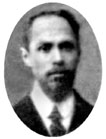

Member of the Legislative Sejm
- In office 1919–1922

Personal details
- Born: Missing required parameter 1=month! 1876 Slonim, Grodno Governorate, Russian Empire
- Died: 28 May 1942 (aged 65–66) Warsaw Ghetto, Occupied Poland
- Party: Folks–Party
- Profession: Writer, journalist, politician

Samuel Hirszhorn (1876 – May 28, 1942) was a Jewish Polish writer, journalist, and politician.

== Life ==
Hirszhorn was born in 1876 in Slonim, the Grodno Governorate, Russia to a well-to-do family.

Hirszhorn moved to Warsaw when he was thirteen and received a commercial and religious education. He began his journalistic career with the progressive Polish press, contributing articles and poems that were both originals and translations from French and Russian. In 1903, with the rise of the Jewish national movement, he wrote the first brochure about Zionism in Polish called Co to jest syonizm? (What is Zionism?). He then became a frequent contributor to the Polish Jewish press, including the weekly Głos Żydowski and the Kraków monthly Moriah. He explored Jewish-Polish relations and translated Yiddish poetry. During World War I, he contributed to the Varshever tageblat, a Yiddish daily that was sponsored by the German occupation authorities and espoused a Jewish nationalist–populist orientation. In 1916, he joined the administration of the Warsaw Jewish Writers and Journalists Association and the staff of the Warsaw Yiddish daily Der moment. He regularly committed to the latter paper for over two decades.

In 1916, Hirszhorn was a founder of the Folkspartei in Poland and was elected to the Warsaw City Council under that party in 1916. In the 1919 election, he was elected a delegate of the Legislative Sejm. He contributed to various Jewish periodicals in both Polish and Yiddish. His translations of Jewish poetry included an anthology of Hayim Nahman Bialik's poems in 1917 and a collection of poems by 60 Jewish poems called Anthologia Poezji Żydowskiej in 1921. Among his best-known literary works was The History of Jews in Poland from the Four-year Sejm until the World War, 1788-1914, which was published in 1923 in Polish and was later translated into Yiddish.

Hirszhorn was in the Warsaw Ghetto during World War II. He kept a diary in the Ghetto that was lost. He committed suicide with poison during an Aktion on May 28, 1942.
