= Warsaw Militia Districts during World War I =

Divisions of occupied Warsaw during World War I

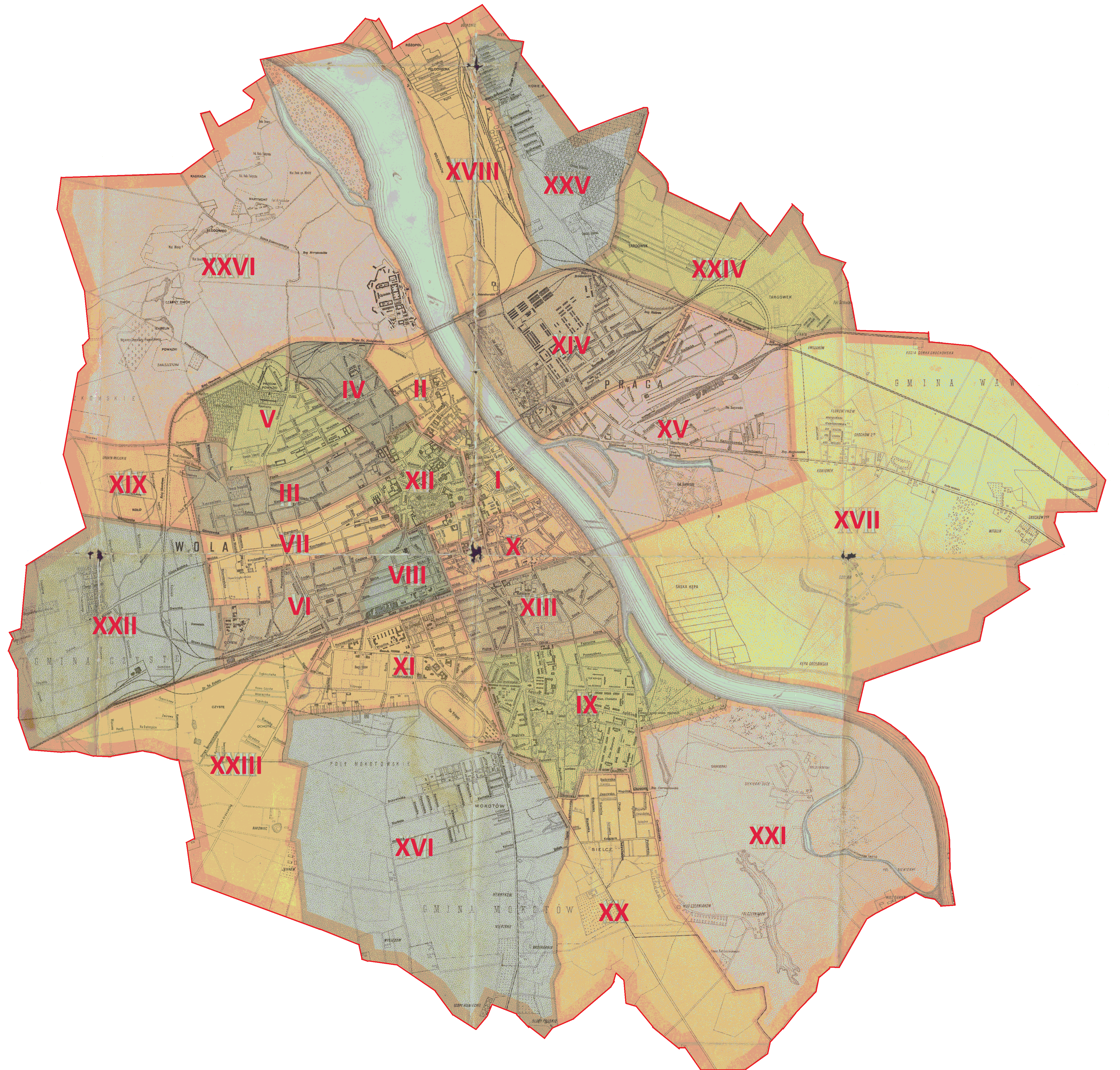
Map of World War I Militia Districts in Warsaw

The Militia Districts (German: Milizbezirk, Polish: Okręg milicyjny) were a geographic-administrative division of the city of Warsaw during the World War I German occupation.

On April 8, 1916 the German Governor for Warsaw Hans Hartwig von Beseler issued a regulation that merged the following villages and suburbs into Warsaw city; Mokotów, Czyste, Czerniaków, Siekierki, the Rakowiec estate, Młociny, Kaskada, Marymont, Potok, Powązki, Pelcowizna, Ustronie, Nowe Bródno, Targówek, Utrata, Grochów I and Grochów II, Kępa Gocławska. Through this expansion the territory of the city of Warsaw increased from 32.73 square kilometres to 114.83 square kilometres.

In 1908 Warsaw had been divided into circuits. The original 1908 circuits had their borders changed a number of times before World War I. As the German authorities reorganized the city administration, they converted the 15 existing circuits into Militia Districts (Commissariats I-XV) whilst creating 11 Militia Districts in the newly integrated areas of the city (Commissariats XVI-XXVI).
