= Bednarska Street, Warsaw =

Street in Warsaw

Coordinates: 52°14′43″N 21°01′05″E

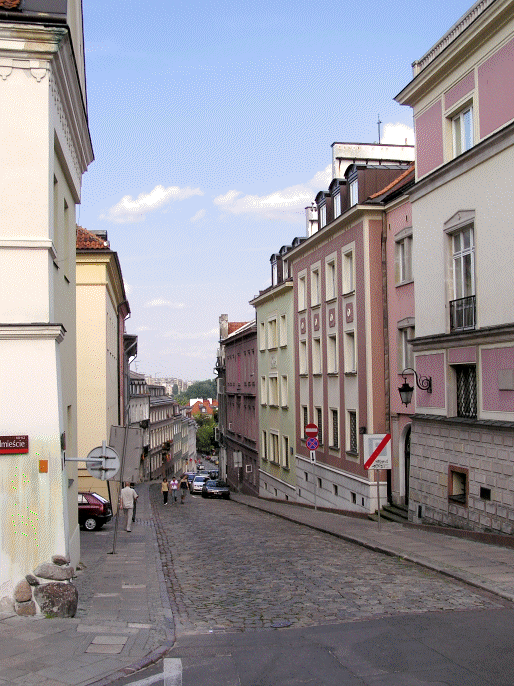
Ulica Bednarska in Warsaw

The Bednarska Street in Warsaw, Poland, is a street in Warsaw's Śródmieście borough, and is the narrowest street in Warsaw (5.3 m). The street received its current name before the year 1743, stemming from its upper part consisting of houses inhabited by artisans, probably mainly by coopers (bednarz being the Polish word for cooper). Officially, the name was given in 1770.
