= Witold Chodźko =

Polish Neurologist and psychiatrist

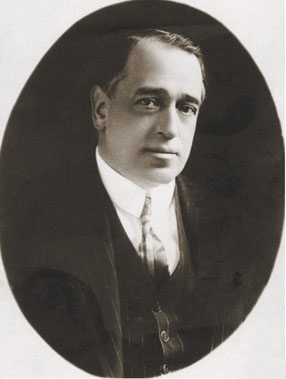
- Born: 1875
- Died: 1954 (aged 78–79)

Witold Chodźko (1875–1954) was a Polish social activist, freemason, public health pioneer, neurologist and psychiatrist.

== Biography ==
Witold Chodźko was born on 1 November 1875 in Piotrków Trybunalski and graduated in 1899 cum eximia laude from the Faculty of Medicine of the University of Warsaw. He had internships in neurology and psychiatry in Paris and Graz, then worked as a psychiatrist in Lublin hospitals, was active in the educational-charitable association "Light", and was one of the founders of the Society "A Drop of Milk," an institution that ran in Lublin an infant feeding program.

In the years 1907-1914, he was the director of a psychiatric hospital in Kochanówka near Lodz, which he expanded and modernized. He created the departments of therapy and rehabilitation through work-related activities. Together with his medical team Chodzko conducted active scientific research. During that period he represented Polish psychiatry at international congresses.

During the First World War he was director of the St. John of God hospital in Warsaw, and in 1916 he was elected to the City Council. At that time he became involved in the organization of public health care. From 1918 to 1923 he was Undersecretary of State, then Minister in the first Polish Ministry of Health, Labor Protection and Welfare. It was said that “his heart was open equally to the crowd and the individuals. This was the first Polish Minister whom any citizen of the state, whether unemployed, beggar or a child, could get to meet twice a week, without reporting first to the secretaries”.

He presented several public health law proposals, including care for the mentally ill, public access to treatments in health spas, preventive vaccination programs, and introduced the idea of community/district nurses. He proposed opening free clinics and reorganizing hospitals to help prevent the spread of venereal diseases among prostitute. He opposed the drafting of eugenics ideas (which was initially regarded as a public hygiene issue) into law, since this could have been a prelude to racist activities. Chodzko created and held (1919–23) the Office of the Extraordinary Commissioner for the fight against epidemics. He also led the Polish Committee for the Aid to Children (Polski Komitet Pomocy Dzieciom, 1924-1926); he was the government commissioner of the Association of Funds for the Sick (Ogólnopaństwowy Związek Kas Chorych, 1929-1931). From 1926 to 1939, the National School of Hygiene operated on his initiative and under his management at the National Institute of Hygiene in Warszawa.

He was the first president of the Polish Psychiatrists’ Association (1920–23). He was also the president of the Supreme Chamber of Medicine (Naczelna Izba Lekarska, 1929–34) and of the Society of Preventive Medicine (1935-1936), the discipline that was of particular interest to him. He also served as president of the Polish Society of Social Medicine (Polskie Towarzystwo Medycyny Społecznej). Chodzko was also a freemason, acting as member of the masonic lodge “The Truth” (Prawda).

From 1920 until 1938, he was in the delegation of the Polish Government to the Assembly of the League of Nations, the International Office of Public Hygiene (an advisory board for child and youth care), and to the International Sanitary Conferences. His main activities were focused on public health of rural areas, fight against drugs and against trafficking of women and children. During World War II Chodzko worked as a custodian guarding the collections of the National Institute of Hygiene’s library and as head of the health section of the Warsaw’s Social Welfare Committee (Komitet Pomocy Społecznej).

In 1945, he was associate professor, and from 1947, he was a full professor and chairman of the Department of General Hygiene at the Faculty of Medicine of the Marie Curie-Skłodowska University (later Medical Academy) in Lublin. In 1951 he founded the Institute of Occupational Medicine and Rural Hygiene, currently the Witold Chodzko Institute of Rural Medicine (Instytut Medycyny Wsi), named in his honor.

He was awarded many Polish and foreign decorations including the Commander's Cross with Star of the Order of Polonia Restituta, the French National Order of the Legion of Honor [Commandeur], Grand Cross of the Order of the Crown of Italy, Grand Cross of the Order of the Crown of Romania, and others.

He died in Lublin on 17 January 1954 and was buried at the Powązki Cemetery in Warszawa.

A Polish NGO, fundacja Salus Publica na rzecz Zdrowia Publicznego im. prof. Witolda Chodźko (the Salus Publica Foundation for Public Health) was established in 2009 in Krakow, Poland, and named in Chodźko's honor.
