= Norbert Barlicki =

Polish politician

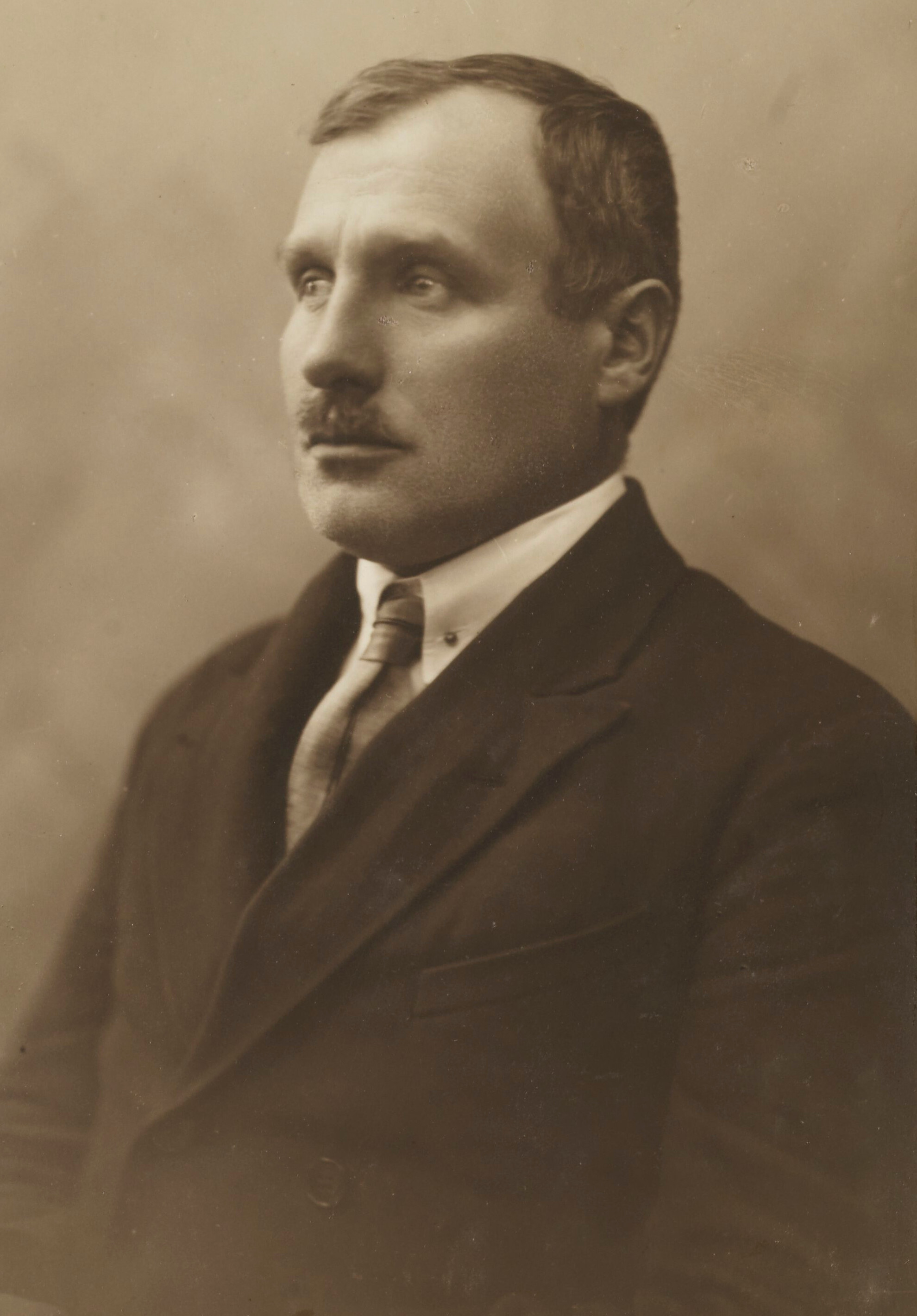
Norbert Barlicki.

Norbert Barlicki (6 June 1880, in Sieciechów, Radom Governorate, Congress Poland – 27 September 1941, in Auschwitz) was a Polish publicist, lawyer and politician of the Polish Socialist Party (PPS).

Barlicki was murdered during the Second World War in the German concentration camp Auschwitz.

== See also ==
- List of Nazi-German concentration camps
- The Holocaust in Poland
- World War II casualties of Poland
