= Adam Próchnik =

Polish socialist activist, politician and historian

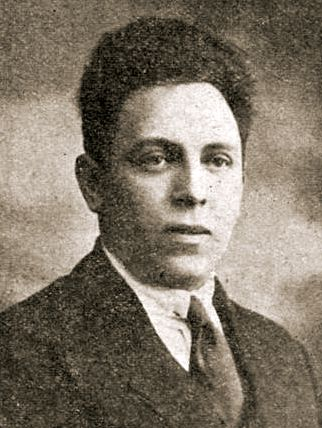

Juror of the Piotrków Trybunalski City Council
- In office 1919–1925

Chairman of the Piotrków Trybunalski City Council
- In office 1925–1931

Member of the Sejm
- In office 4 March 1928 – 16 November 1930 Serving with Zygmunt Zaremba
- President: Ignacy Mościcki
- Prime Minister: Kazimierz Bartel
- Chancellor: Gabriel Czechowicz
- Constituency: Piotrków County

Councillor of the Warsaw City Council
- In office 18 December 1938 – 1 September 1939

Political Consultative Committee
- In office 28 October 1941 – 22 May 1942

Personal details
- Born: Adam Feliks Próchnik; August 21, 1892 Lemberg, Kingdom of Galicia and Lodomeria
- Died: May 22, 1942 (aged 49) Warschau, General Government
- Resting place: Evangelical Reformed Cemetery, Warsaw
- Party: Polish Socialists
- Other political affiliations: Polish Social Democratic Party of Galicia; Polish Socialist Party
- Spouses: Jadwiga née Gorzycka; Elżbieta Józefa née Sawicka; Irena née Gomulińska
- Relations: Ignacy Daszyński
- Children: 3
- Parents: Izydor Próchnik (father); Felicja née Nossig (mother)
- Relatives: Alfred Nossig
- Education: Universität Lemberg

Military service
- Allegiance: Union of Active Struggle; Riflemen's Association; Imperial-Royal Landwehr; Wolność (Polish Military Organisation); 5th Legions' Infantry Regiment
- Rank: Second lieutenant
- Unit: Oficerskiej Kadry Okręgowej Nr I
- Battles/wars: Carpathian Campaign; Battle of Lemberg
- Awards: Order of the Cross of Grunwald (1st class) Cross of Independence (Poland) Cross of Valor (3rd time) Medal for the Wounded 1917 Austria

Adam Feliks Próchnik (Polish pronunciation: [ˈadam ˈpruxɲik]; Lwów, 21 August 1892 – 22 May 1942, Warsaw) was a Polish socialist activist, politician and historian.

== Life ==
Próchnik was born in Lwów, Austrian partition (now, Lviv, Ukraine) on 21 August 1892 to a middle class Jewish family. His mother, née Felicja Nossig, was the sister of the sculptor and Zionist activist Alfred Nossig. According to some sources, he was the extramarital son of the Polish socialist Ignacy Daszyński.

While in high school he became involved in socialist activism. As a student, he joined the Polish Social Democratic Party of Galicia; he supported the Polish Socialist Party – Left faction over the Polish Socialist Party – Revolutionary Faction led by Józef Piłsudski.

Before World War I he joined the pro-independence paramilitary Polish organization, the Union of Armed Struggle. With the outbreak of World War I, he was conscripted into the Austro-Hungarian Army in 1914, and was badly wounded in 1917. During his convalescence in Vienna, he became a member of a secret Polish organization, the Polish Military Organisation. As a member of PMO he encouraged Polish soldiers to desert from the Austrian Army and join newly created Polish formations. This resulted in a threat of court martial from the Austro-Hungarian Army, but eventually he was freed. Next, he participated in the battle of Lwów during the Polish–Ukrainian War.

In interwar Poland, Próchnik became an activist of the Polish Socialist Party and supported initiatives designed to improve the situation of the country's working class. He supported the inclusion of Silesia into renascent Poland. In the 1928 legislative elections, he was elected a deputy to the Polish Sejm. He steadily drifted to more extreme left position, supporting cooperation with the communists. Often - under pen-name Henryk Swoboda and publishing mostly in Robotnik - published essays attacking the right-wing sanacja Polish government and the endecja faction, which he blamed for undermining the nascent Polish democracy. This resulted in some of his publications being censored by the state. Some of his works would appear in unabridged version only after his death, published in the People's Republic of Poland.

He worked as an archivist in Piotrków and Poznań. For a time he was employed by Poland's Ministry of Culture and Religion. His attempt to enter the academic life ended when his application for a position in the University of Warsaw was rejected, due to his left wing views being unpopular among the right wing faculty there (despite a support from his candidature from professor Wacław Tokarz. He nonetheless became a member of the Polish Historical Society, published in historical journals and attended professional conferences.

During World War II, in occupied Poland, Próchnik continued his political activities, supporting a PPS-affiliated underground printing press (Barykada Wolności). He joined the leftist PPS group, Polish Socialists (Polscy Socjaliści), but he tried to reconcile the divisions within PPS and took part in the negotiations with the more centrist PPS-WRN. He was involved in the collaborative underground effort to document Nazi crimes in Poland, worked in the underground Military History Bureau and contributed to the Kronika Okupacji project. He advocated cooperation with the Soviet Union. He became a member of the Political Consultative Committee. On 22 May 1942 he died of a heart attack. He is buried in Evangelical-Reformed Cemetery in Warsaw.

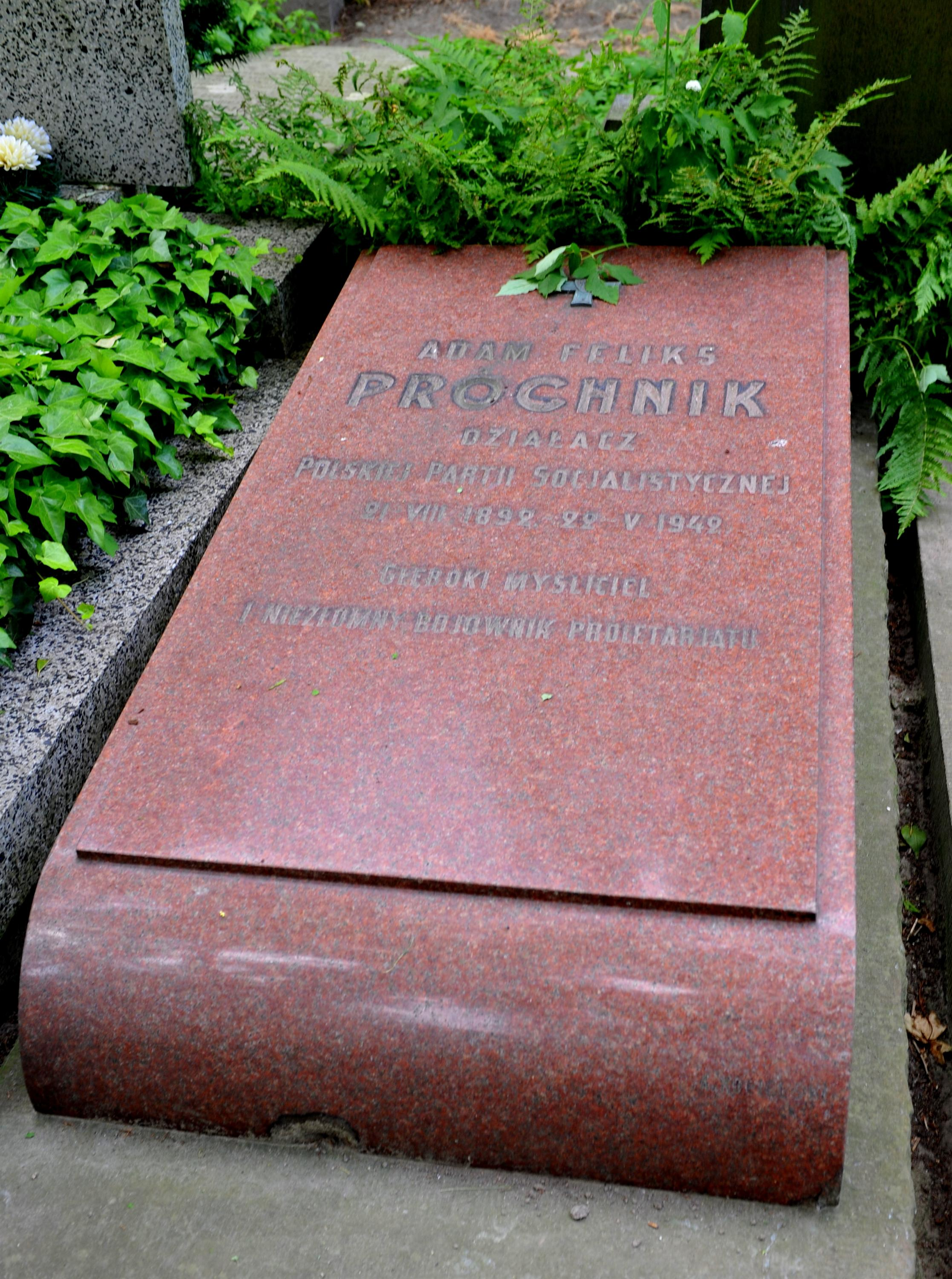
Próchnik's Warsaw grave

== Tributes ==
Several landmarks and organizations in Poland bear Próchnik's name.

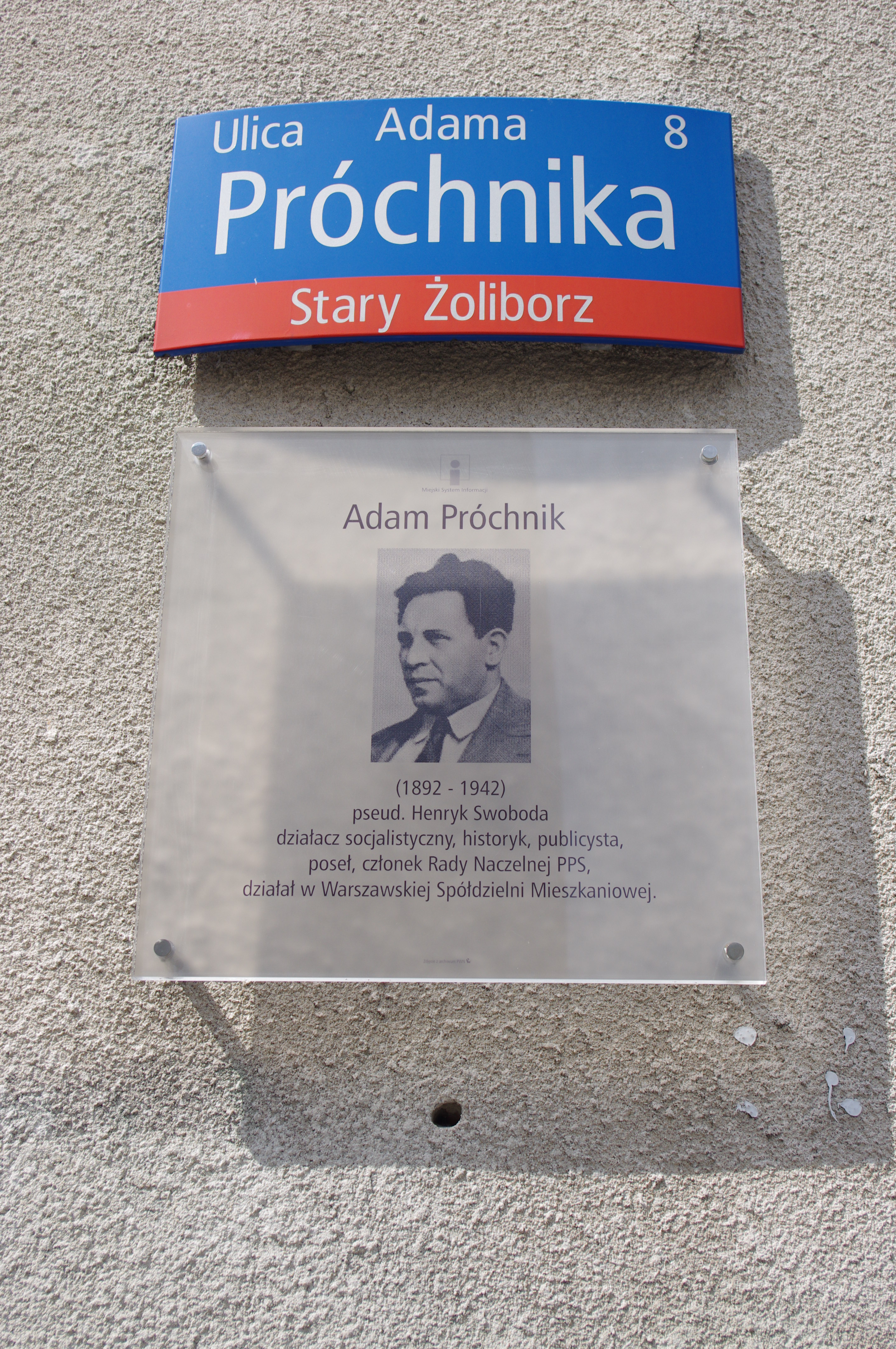
A plaque commemorating Próchnik, on Adam Próchnik Street in Old Żoliborz

== Works ==
In his historical works, Próchnik was a strong adherent to Marxist views, and supported the dialectic materialism perspective. He was interested in studying the revolutionary processes, including social movements. He published numerous articles, both in academic journals and popular press, as well as several books. His historical research focused on following areas: French Revolution and its Polish contemporary, the Kościuszko Uprising; the period of Polish history following the failure of the January Uprising of 1863–1864; the study of the labor movement in Poland, including a study of the women's role in the Polish labor movement (both areas in which he was a pioneer); and contemporary history of the Second Polish Republic. Overall, his works are regarded as well researched and well written.

- "Obrona Lwowa od 1 do 22 listopada 1918", Zamość 1919;
- "Demokracja Kościuszkowska", Lwów 1920, Warszawa 1947;
- "Bunt łódzki w roku 1892", Warszawa (?) 1932;
- as Henryk Swoboda "Pierwsze piętnastolecie Polski niepodległej", (first serialized in 1933 in newspaper "Robotnik" (censored), first full version translated into German in 1933. Complete Polish editions in 1957 and 1983.
- "W trzynastą rocznicę "Krwawej środy", Warszawa 1936;
- "Ideologia spółdzielczości robotniczej" Warszawa 1937;
- "Co to jest spółdzielczość. Istota - cel - zadania", Warszawa 1937;
- "Idee i ludzie", Warszawa 1938;
- "Powstanie państwa polskiego", Warszawa 1939;
- "Stronnictwa polityczne Wielkiej Rewolucji Francuskiej", Warszawa 1958;
- "Studia z dziejów polskiego ruchu robotniczego" (editor K. Dunin-Wąsowicz), Warszawa 1958;
- "Studia i szkice" (editor K.Dunin-Wąsowicz), Warszawa 1962;
- "Francja i Polskaw latach 1789-1794" (editor K.Dunin-Wąsowicz), Warszawa 1964;
- "Wybór publicystyki" (editors M.M.Drozdowski, K.Dunin-Wąsowicz, Z.Marciniak, J.Żarnowski), Warszawa 1971;

== See also ==
- List of Poles
