= Moraczewski =

Moraczewski (feminine: Moraczewska, plural: Moraczewscy) is a Polish surname that may refer to:

- Jędrzej Moraczewski (1870–1944), Polish politician
- Zofia Moraczewska (1873–1958), Polish politician
- Maciej Moraczewski (1840–1928), Polish architect
