= Alfred Nossig =

Jewish sculptor (1864–1943)

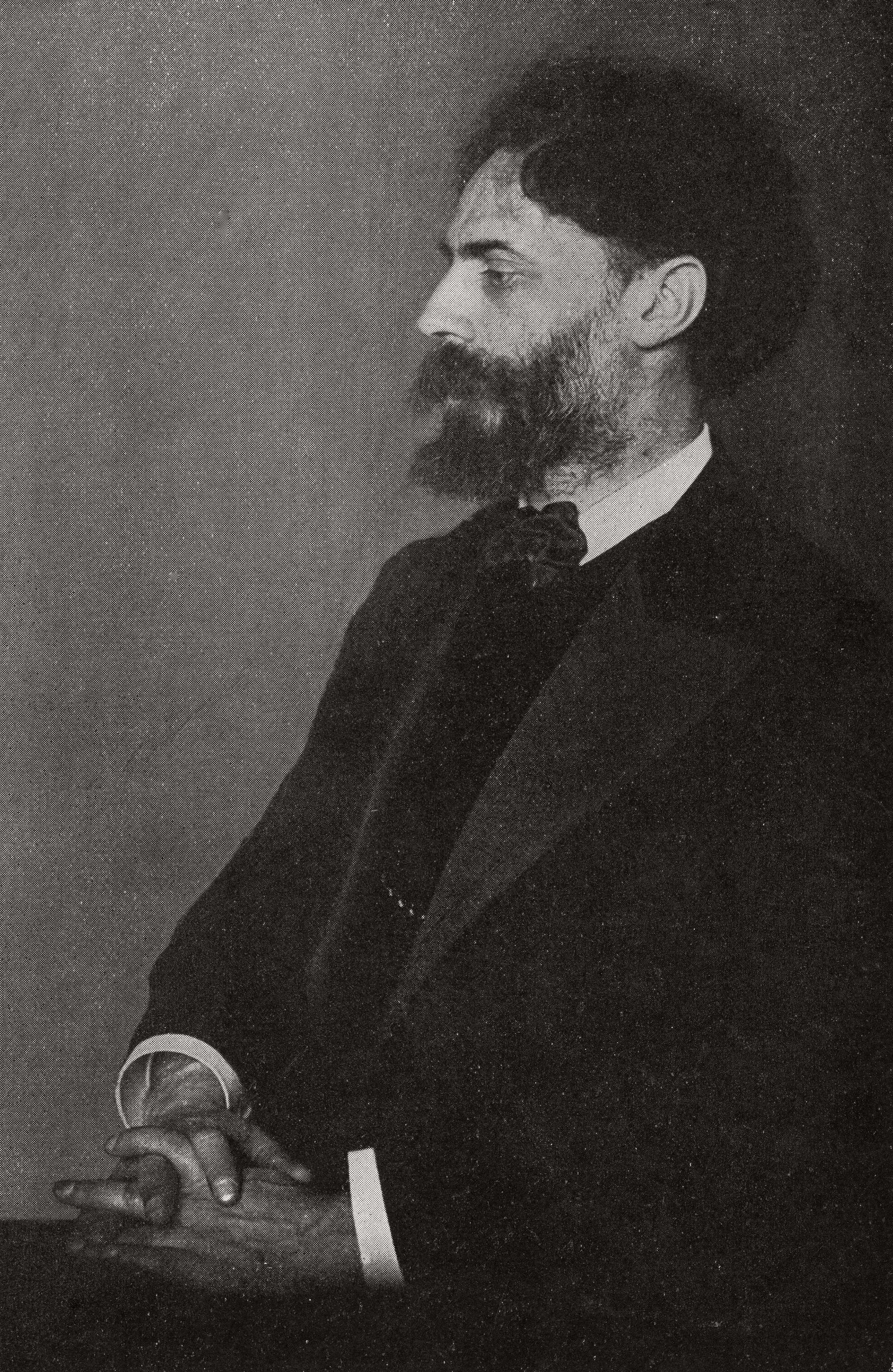
- Born: 18 April 1864; Lviv, Austrian Empire
- Died: 22 February 1943 (aged 78); Warsaw Ghetto, Warsaw, German-occupied Poland
- Cause of death: Execution by shooting

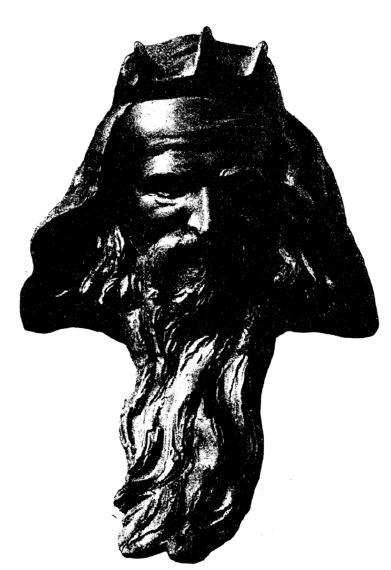
Sculpture by Nossig of King Solomon, c. 1900

Alfred Nossig (18 April 1864 – 22 February 1943) was a Jewish sculptor, writer, and activist in Zionism and Polish civil society. During World War II, he was held in the Warsaw Ghetto. Other Jews later accused Nossig of collaborating with the Gestapo.

Jewish partisans confronted Nossig in his apartment, demanding answers for the accusations. While being questioned, Nossig fell to his knees and begged for his life, threatening them that the Germans would retaliate if he was killed. Undeterred, the partisans executed him. After searching his body, they found German documents.

Nossig was a eugenicist who believed in the "biological superiority" of Jews.

== Biography ==
Alfred Nossig was born to a wealthy family in Lemberg (now Lviv), then part of the Austrian Empire (now Ukraine). Nossig's father exposed him to German culture and was an activist for Jewish rights in Galicia, serving as secretary of the Jewish community there. In the early 1880s, Polish romanticism inspired Nossig to formulate ideas about Jewish assimilation in Polish culture, which he expressed in the periodical Ojczyzna (The Fatherland) and in an organization (which he himself founded) called "Przymierze Braci" (Union of Brothers). He was a pioneer in the field of Jewish demography during his time as a student at Lemberg University, winning a prize in 1884 from the university senate for his essay "O ludności" (On Population). Nossig's sister Felicja Nossig (1855–1939) was active in Polish social democratic politics and women's rights, and was the mother of the Marxist socialist activist Adam Próchnik, (whose father was probably the socialist politician Ignacy Daszyński).

== Early career ==
Nossig began to write theatre reviews for Polish and Jewish newspapers, and in 1888 published his first collection of poems, Poezje, which won a competition in Warsaw. He subsequently published a play King of the Jews about Simon bar Kokhba, the instigator of the Bar Kochba revolt against the Roman Empire. In 1887, Nossig had published the first Zionist work in the Polish language. It was titled "An Attempt to Solve the Jewish Problem" (Próba rozwiązania kwestji źydowskiej), and argued that there is no future for the Jews in the Diaspora; thus, Jews must establish their own independent state in Palestine and adjacent countries. He also undertook and published research into statistics of the Jewish population of Central Europe to substantiate his ideas. Nossig's defection from assimilationist to nationalist Jewish opinions – it has been claimed that he was the first person to use the word 'Zionist' – caused controversy in his circles.

In 1892, Nossig was living in Vienna where he was active as an art-curator and writer, and moved in artistic circles. His friends included the pianist and composer Paderewski, for whom he wrote the libretto of an opera, Manru (1901). An acquaintance of that period wrote of him: "The root of his soul: a poetic Jewishness; the source of his innermost hidden life: the national revival of the Jewish people; his bearing, his manners, his behaviour towards other human beings, his entire outward mask: a perfect Pole; [...] his culture, his work-style and meticulousness: really true German."

In 1894 Nossig moved to Paris, where he was a correspondent of the Polish newspaper Gazeta Lwowska. While there he wrote a detailed essay in German, "Social Hygiene of the Jews and Ancient Oriental People", seeking to establish Mosaic law on health and hygiene as amongst the founding works on modern hygienic standards. At this time Theodor Herzl was also based in Paris as a newspaper correspondent. Nossig was critical of Herzl's Zionist tactics, but was involved with plans by Abraham Salz, an early colleague of Herzl, to found a village in Palestine for settlers from Galicia.

During this period, Nossig was also active as a (self-taught) sculptor, exhibiting in Paris, Vienna and Berlin. His subjects included The Wandering Jew, Judas Maccabaeus, and King Solomon, as well as portrait busts of Paderewski and of Max Nordau, and a death-mask of Empress Elisabeth of Austria.

== Zionist activism ==
In 1900 Nossig moved again, this time to Berlin. He published in that year an essay calling for world peace on the basis of treaties to be agreed by all European nations – a sort of early European Union – as a part of which Jews would be enabled to settle in Ottoman Palestine. He also associated with the so-called "practical Zionists" who stayed a clear distance from the activities of Herzl's World Zionist Organization (WZO). He also sat on the board of the Jewish publishing house Jüdischer Verlag along with Martin Buber, and became a regular contributor to the journal Ost und West. Developing an "Association for Jewish Statistics" he argued that the resulting evidence would not only counter anti-semitism but also Jewish self-hatred. In other writings he also continued as a playwright and wrote a study "Revision der Socialismus (A Revision of Socialism)", which emphasized the social messages of Judaism.

In 1903 Nossig worked closely with Chaim Weizmann hoping to establish a Jewish university. Weizmann nominated Nossig to take part in the Zionist Congress at Basel that year. At the congress Nossig and his allies criticized Herzl for seeking to "buy" a homeland in Palestine, leaving Jews open to the historic allegation that Jews were 'dealers', rather than establishing themselves by work. This intervention cost him the personal support of Weizmann and others. At the 1907 Eighth Zionist Congress, Nossig advocated a broad approach to Zionism across the Jewish European communities, with urban and rural settlements both in Palestine and in neighbouring lands. As a member of the propaganda committee of the WZO, he set out plans for a Zionist news agency and newspaper, and advocate cooperation with the Ottoman Empire to establish settlements. However, Nossig's personality continued to alienate supporters and he had little direct involvement with the WZO after 1908. In that year he founded his own organization, the "Allgemeine Jüdische Kolonisations-Organisation" (AJKO), and in the following years undertook a number of initiatives to work with the leaders of the Young Turk Revolution in Constantinople, frequently visiting there. In 1911 he claimed to the British paper The Daily Mail that the AJKO would benefit Britain by diverting the flow of Russian immigrants.

During World War I, he organized in 1915 the provision of a medical unit to the Turkish forces, financed by German Jewish organizations, in an attempt to persuade Sultan Mehmed V to accept the immigration of Eastern European Jews. Neither this nor further visits had any effect. In the period following the Balfour Declaration of November 1917, Nossig was enlisted by some German Zionist organizations to help lobby for a Turkish equivalent of the Declaration. On 5 January 1918, Nossig met Talat Pasha, then Turkish Minister of the Interior, in Berlin, who offered him vague promises. After inconclusive talks, negotiations in Constantinople folded; however the impression remained with some (including the US Ambassador in Constantinople, Henry Morgenthau Sr.), that Nossig had been acting as an agent for the German authorities.

The formation of an independent Poland after the Treaty of Versailles, with his old friend Paderewski as its Prime Minister, gave Nossig the opportunity of acting as a mediator between the Government of Paderewski's successor, Władysław Grabski, and the Polish Jewish community. He hoped to unite the various Jewish factions into a single representative body. However due to divisions in Polish Jewry between assimilationists, traditionalists, Zionists and socialists, and given the fundamental anti-semitism of Marshal Piłsudski (who in reality held political power in the new state), no progress was made.

Nossig left Poland, and sought to establish a world-wide support organization for Jewry. In this context he rebuked existing Zionist leadership for its insensitivity to Arab concerns, and distanced himself from the extreme Jewish nationalism of Ze'ev Jabotinsky, whom he characterized as "a Jewish Trotsky". He published his ideas in an essay "Zionism and Jewishness: Crisis and Solution" (1922). Return visits to Poland later in the decade showed he had little political influence either with the Polish government or with the Jewish community, and rumours again began to circulate that Nossig was acting in the interests of the German government.

== Last years ==
Living in Berlin during the early years of the Nazi regime, he began to conceive of a sculptured monument including over 20 statues, which he intended to erect on Mount Zion, entitled "The Holy Mountain", and exhibited a model of this in Berlin in 1936. Before the war, Nossig was offered asylum in Palestine, but refused to leave Berlin without his statues.

In 1938, when he was 75 years old, Nossig was living in Prague, where he was described by the writer Josef Fraenkel as "old, ill and senile. A German nurse took care of him." At the outbreak of war Nossig fled to Poland and was placed in the care of the Jewish Welfare Board in Warsaw. Adam Czerniaków, the head of the Warsaw Ghetto Judenrat, was told to employ him, apparently by the German authorities, and Nossig was appointed as ghetto emigration officer; in this position he sought to negotiate with the Gestapo permission to emigrate for some Jewish leaders, without (of course) any result; emigration became expressly forbidden in November 1940. Nossig was then made director of the Arts and Culture department of the ghetto, with no noteworthy effect.

== Death ==
In unclear circumstances Nossig became talked of in the Ghetto as a collaborator with the Germans. Nossig was accused of providing regular reports to the Nazis on Jewish underground activities in the ghetto, and an underground resistance group, the Jewish Combat Organization, held an impromptu trial and sentenced him to death. Nossig had fallen to his knees and begged for his life, threatening them with German retaliation if he was killed. Undeterred, the partisans executed him in his apartment by shooting on 22 February 1943. He was 78 years old.

According to some of Nossig's executioners, a Gestapo identity card and a six-page dossier on the Jewish underground movement were recovered from his personal effects after his execution. He was buried in the Jewish cemetery at Okopowa Street in Warsaw. The exact site of his burial is unknown; only a fragment of a plaque from his tombstone (in plot 67, row 7) has survived.
