= Robotnik =

Robotnik (Polish, 'worker', and Czech/Slovak: robotník, 'worker') may refer to:

- Robotnik (1894–1939), a newspaper published by the Polish Socialist Party.
- Robotnik (1983–1990), a newspaper published during the period of martial law in Poland.
- Doctor Eggman or Doctor Ivo Robotnik, the primary antagonist of the Sonic the Hedgehog video game series.
  - Gerald Robotnik, grandfather of Doctor Ivo Robotnik.
  - Maria Robotnik, granddaughter of Gerald Robotnik and cousin of Doctor Ivo Robotnik.
- Robotnik Automation, a Spanish robotics company.

== See also ==
- Robotnikinin
- Worker (disambiguation)
- Robot (disambiguation)
