= Davis Trietsch =

German Zionist writer and settlement theorist (1870–1935)

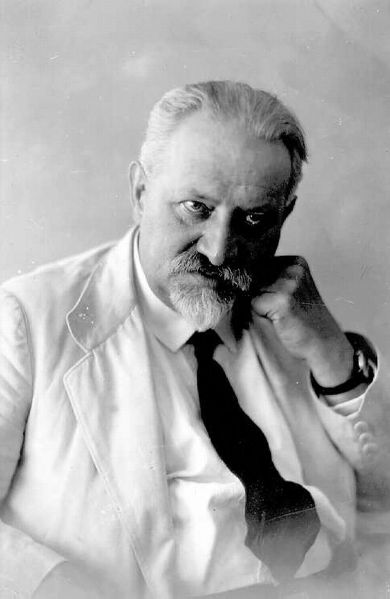
- Trietsch in Palestine
- Born: 4 January 1870; Dresden, Kingdom of Saxony
- Died: 31 January 1935 (aged 65); Ramatayim, Mandatory Palestine
- Resting place: Magdiel, Hod HaSharon
- Occupations: Writer, publisher, Zionist
- Spouse: Emma (Esther) Thomaschewsky
- Children: 5

Davis Trietsch (4 January 1870 – 31 January 1935) was a German Zionist writer and publisher. A proponent of practical Zionism rather than political, he argued from the 1890s for immediate Jewish colonization wherever it was possible, including in Cyprus and at El-Arish, a programme he called "Zionist maximalism". He opposed Herzl's insistence that a charter from the Ottoman government must precede any colonizing or even preparatory work, and he held that industry rather than agriculture should carry the settlement. Both positions met strong resistance in the movement.

Trietsch co-founded the journal Ost und West and the Jüdischer Verlag publishing house, edited the periodical Palästina and helped found an information bureau in Jaffa that coordinated Jewish immigration to Ottoman Palestine. He sat on the Zionist General Council from 1907 to 1911 and again from 1920 to 1921. He wrote extensively on the economics of Jewish settlement, promoting industry, garden cities and poultry farming as its basis.

During the First World War he published pamphlets arguing that Jews and Germans formed a community of language and interest and that Germany should take up the Zionist cause. The British government commissioned Arnold J. Toynbee to answer him.

He settled in Mandatory Palestine in 1932 and helped establish Ramot HaShavim the following year. He was largely forgotten after his death and became the subject of renewed scholarly attention with a 2022 monograph by Lisa Sophie Gebhard.

== Early life ==
Trietsch was born in Dresden, the capital of the Kingdom of Saxony, on 4 January 1870. His father, Ludwig Trietsch (1835–1886), served the Jewish community as a shochet and cantor, and his mother was Rosalie Nickelsburg (1843–1879).

The family was of modest means. His mother died when he was a child and he and his brothers were then sent to a Jewish charitable children's home. He attended school in Berlin between 1880 and 1886 and afterwards served an apprenticeship.

He never attended university and held no academic degree. This set him apart from most officials of the Zionist Organization.

== New York and the emigration question ==
Trietsch emigrated to New York in 1893, where he remained until 1899.

There he was exposed to the poverty of recently arrived Eastern European Jewish immigrants who had fled economic hardship and antisemitic pogroms, most of them from the Russian Empire. The Jewish emigration question became the subject of his work. He later described it as the greatest of all the Jewish problems of the day.

In 1895, still before Theodor Herzl launched political Zionism, he proposed Jewish colonization of British-ruled Cyprus.

He joined the Zionist movement in about 1896 and took part in the First Zionist Congress at Basel in 1897, having come from the United States, and he helped build the Federation of American Zionists.

== Cyprus and "Greater Palestine" ==
Trietsch returned to Berlin in 1899 and published a pamphlet, The Future of Cyprus, linking the island's future to British interests and to the Zionist movement.

At the Third Zionist Congress in Basel that August he objected to the movement's habit of speaking of "Palestine and Syria", arguing that the neighbouring parts of Syria could not realistically be obtained. He said that the specific phrase showed that Zionists realized that they needed a greater Palestine but had looked for it in the wrong direction. Lands divide and seas connect, he told the delegates, and they already knew that he had Cyprus in mind.

The hall interrupted him repeatedly and called on him to stop. Herzl, who was in the chair, twice defended his right to be heard, then put it to the delegates whether he should be allowed to continue. The majority voted that he should not. He continued nonetheless.

In Germany he assembled a support committee that included Otto Warburg and Willy Bambus and opened negotiations with the High Commissioner of Cyprus and the British Colonial Office. He also took the scheme to the movement's constituencies. In November 1899 he canvassed in Romania, putting it at Galați to the main Zionist committee, which backed him on condition that the British government agreed. At Bucharest he was interviewed at length by Moses Schwarzfeld of Egalitatea, who took up the cause in his own paper. Cyprus, Trietsch told him, would be the first gate to Palestine and a place where Jews then leaving for America might instead be gathered near the Land of Israel, and he offered settlers terms of 5,000 francs a family repayable over five years, after which the land, a house and livestock would be theirs. Ha-Tsefira printed a dismissive note beneath the interview. It said the conversation had yielded no new idea, that the question needed a proper survey by experts and not "a stroll by Mr Trietsch" and that it was unclear whether he was qualified in farming, railways or trade, though he spoke confidently about all three.

In early 1900 he recruited a group of Jews from Borysław in Galicia, secured employment commitments for them in Cyprus and presented the governor with a development plan that he said could support a thousand families. The venture failed. The work proved limited and conditions poor and all twelve families returned home.

Herzl took an interest in the Cyprus idea in 1902, although the Uganda Scheme gained more support. At the Sixth Zionist Congress in 1903 Trietsch was the first delegate to reject the Uganda proposal publicly, and the movement abandoned it the following year. He objected that it would scatter the movement's effort, where his own scheme concentrated Jewish migration in one region. At the same congress he and the writer Alfred Nossig accused the Zionist leadership of not having pursued the El-Arish project with enough vigour. Trietsch added that refusing the colonization the Sultan had offered across the Ottoman empire had been a serious mistake. He was not arguing for piecemeal settlement but for systematic colonizing work to prepare a mass immigration.

Trietsch advocated the colonization of a "Greater Palestine" that would take in Cyprus and El-Arish alongside Palestine itself, a programme he described as "Zionist maximalism".

A Zionist tribute of 1930 credited him with being the first to argue for an Anglo-Jewish policy of colonization in the Near East. He regarded Herzl's negotiations over El-Arish in 1902 and 1903 as an adoption of his own programme without him and organized a separate expedition to El-Arish in 1906. From 1903 to 1906 he ran the Jüdische Orient-Kolonisations-Gesellschaft, a colonization company that met with little enthusiasm within the organized Zionist movement.

== Zionist Organization ==
In 1901 Trietsch was among the founders of the Democratic Zionist Fraction, together with Chaim Weizmann, Martin Buber, Berthold Feiwel, Leo Motzkin and Yitzhak Gruenbaum. The Fraction came before the public shortly before the Fifth Zionist Congress of December 1901 and called for a synthesis of political and cultural work, by which it meant present-day work in the diaspora alongside practical work in Palestine. Trietsch belonged to the Zionist Organization for decades but served on none of its specialist bodies. His standing quarrel with Herzl was over the charter. Herzl held that a charter from the Ottoman government had to come before any colonizing work, or even before preparatory work, and Trietsch opposed that as a reason for doing nothing.

At the Eighth Zionist Congress at The Hague in 1907, during a debate on the supply of Jewish labour to the Palestine market, he was criticised from the floor by Shlomo Kaplansky of Poale Zion. Kaplansky told the congress that Trietsch spoke warmly about occupying every economic position in Palestine, yet had told Jewish workers privately that he would not hold back from replacing them with Arab or fellahin labourers. Kaplansky acknowledged that this was a private matter that did not concern the congress, but said it was relevant since it was characteristic of conditions in Palestine.

Later in the same congress Trietsch was nominated for one of the Palestine seats on the Greater Actions Committee. The delegate Abneroff protested against his candidacy in the name of a group of the Palestine population and of part of the Poale Zion delegation, saying that opinion in Palestine had turned against Trietsch's dealings with his workers.

Trietsch replied that protests against such nominations were unprecedented. He described the objectors as a small group of Poale Zion in Jaffa and declined to discuss the incident behind the protest, saying that airing it would not serve the programme of practical work in Palestine. He told the congress that he would carry on working whether or not it elected him. He was elected by 90 votes to 69, the only one of four nominees whose election was put to a counted vote rather than a show of hands. He served on the Zionist General Council from 1907 to 1911 and again from 1920 to 1921.

The quarrel followed him out of the congress hall. Three months later he came to Lemberg to lecture on Palestine and Poale Zion resolved to boycott the meeting. They took every seat in the hall and walked out together the moment he appeared, leaving him to an empty room. Their resolution said they had protested against him in particular because, as director of what they called the Jewish Commercial Company in Palestine, he had behaved badly toward Jewish workers during a strike.

== Publishing ==
Trietsch's 1926 map of the Jewish world, which put the total at 18 million. He issued it in the same year as his Atlas der jüdischen Welt.

Trietsch's publishing work was conducted almost entirely in German and from Berlin. Trietsch lived off his writing. Before his own books sold, he earned his living writing publicity material for large commercial firms.

In 1901 he and Leo Winz founded Ost und West. Illustrierte Monatsschrift für Modernes Judentum ("East and West: Illustrated Monthly for Modern Jewry"). Trietsch was credited as co-editor. The magazine addressed itself to a modern, German-reading Jewish public and it ran in Berlin until 1923.

The following year he founded a second journal with the writer Alfred Nossig, Palästina. Zeitschrift für den Aufbau Palästinas ("Palestine: Journal for the Building Up of Palestine"), which he also co-edited. It was the first German-Jewish periodical focused on Palestine and Zionist activity there. From 1 January 1904 the official Zionist Palestine Commission took it over and published it as Altneuland.

After the First World War he founded and edited a third, Volk und Land. Jüdische Wochenschrift für Politik, Wirtschaft und Palästina-Arbeit ("People and Land: Jewish Weekly for Politics, Economics and Palestine Work"), which appeared in Berlin from 1919. He used it to promote his own settlement proposals.

Trietsch was also among the founders of three publishing houses. In 1902 he helped found the Jüdischer Verlag in Berlin with Chaim Weizmann and others, and he was its first managing director. The house published writers including Else Lasker-Schüler and Martin Buber, and it continued until 1938. He ran the Orient-Verlag from 1910 to 1932 and he co-founded the Welt-Verlag, which operated from 1918 to 1933.

His own books were descriptive handbooks and they were the most widely read of his writings. The Palästina-Handbuch (1907) went through five editions and the Levante-Handbuch (1909) through three. Written in German, these regional studies found an audience in the German-speaking world well beyond Jewish readers. The Palästina-Handbuch appeared first in a Hebrew translation by Jehuda Grasowsky, and an English edition followed in 1907. Otto Warburg commended it at the Eighth Zionist Congress as a cheap book that would spread knowledge of Palestine among the movement's poorer members. It was still in use years later, carried by students on a journey to Palestine in 1913, the young Nahum Goldmann among them, and drawn on by Curt Nawratzki for his study of Jewish colonisation in 1914.

== Information bureaus ==
Trietsch visited Palestine in 1900 and again in 1904. He wrote up both journeys in Palästina. In January 1906 he settled in Jaffa for two years.

In March 1906, with other Zionists living in the country, he founded an Informationsbüro für Palästina there. It was the first body that tried to coordinate Jewish immigration to the country systematically and it was separate from the Palestine Office that Arthur Ruppin set up in 1908. Menachem Sheinkin directed it, and the inner committee included the physician Chaim Chissin, the merchant Meir Dizengoff, the writer A. D. Gordon and David Haym, the first representative in Palestine of the Jewish Colonization Association. The bureau set out to gather information on the economy and geography of the country as well as to publish statistics. It worked from Howard Street, next to the British consulate, and had branches in Jerusalem, Haifa, Beirut, Cairo, Aleppo, Salonika, Constantinople and Odessa. He attended the Eighth Zionist Congress at The Hague in 1907 as a delegate from Palestine.

The historian Ines Sonder has noted a further episode from these years. In an exchange of letters in 1929, Akiva Aryeh Weiss recalled that Trietsch had written the first memorandum for Ahuzat Bayit, the Jaffa housing society out of which Tel Aviv grew. Trietsch confirmed that he remembered drafting it, though did not recall how much of his text survived. Sonder notes that the memorandum has no legacy in the founding narrative of the city.

Twenty years later Trietsch opened a second bureau, this time in the United States. He lived in New York from 1926 to 1927 while he set it up. Much of his work between the wars went into bringing American methods and machinery to Palestine.

== First World War ==
Trietsch's interest in a German role in the Near East predated the First World War. In 1912 he published Deutschland und der Islam. Eine weltpolitische Studie (Germany and Islam: a world-political study).

During the war he wrote pamphlets that argued above all against Britain. He also worked in the statistical department of the German army and from 1915 his pamphlets were officially sponsored and argued for cooperation between Zionism and Germany after the war. Two of them made the case from language, Juden und Deutsche. Eine Sprach- und Interessengemeinschaft (Jews and Germans: a community of language and interests) in 1915 and Deutsch als Weltsprache (German as a world language) in 1916.

The best known was Die Juden der Türkei (The Jews of Turkey), which appeared in 1915 as the eighth pamphlet in the series Länder und Völker der Türkei issued by the Deutsches Vorderasienscomitee. In it Trietsch argued that about 12.9 million of the world's 14.3 million Jews spoke German or Yiddish as a mother tongue, that in language and commercial orientation Eastern European Jewry was "an asset to German influence" and that Jews were "a Near Eastern element in Germany and a German element in Turkey". On that basis he held that there were grounds for discussing a German protectorate over Jewry as a whole.

At the request of the British government, Arnold J. Toynbee rebuffed his argument in Turkey: A Past and a Future (1917), stating that Zionism had "already challenged and defeated the policy which Dr. Trietsch represents".

== Settlement thought ==
Trietsch's 1926 map of Palestine. Jewish colonies and holdings are marked in red and the inset shows the mandate territory with its neighbours and railways.

Trietsch believed that industry and trade would pay for Jewish settlement in Palestine and that farming alone would not suffice.

In 1903 he brought the garden city idea into Zionist debate, and he was remembered as a pioneer of it within the movement. His version of it was a small house with a fruit and vegetable garden large enough to feed the family that lived there. His early advocacy of garden cities and cooperative settlements was later seen as pointing the way, and ventures in Palestine built on it.

Trietsch had seen American methods when living there and wanted them used in settlement in Palestine. He argued for machinery and for modern farming techniques, and he studied American agricultural practice and the rationalised management known as Taylorism closely. Poultry and egg production were his model enterprise. He also put money into a machine for planting crops called the Fortuna.

Palestine had almost no fuel of its own, and Trietsch looked for ways to run irrigation and pumping without it. In June 1901, writing in Ost und West under the pen name B. Ebenstein, he described a Californian solar motor built by the engineer Aubrey Eneas and exhibited at South Pasadena. He called it a fantastic-looking machine and judged it well suited to the Zionist project, having noticed that the climate and terrain of California resembled those of Palestine. He argued for water and wind power as well. The solar motor was never used in Palestine, and its maker wound up his company after the machines proved costly and unreliable.

Gebhard writes that he saw Palestine not just as a place to settle but as a "laboratory of future possibilities". It would be a place that could take the good parts of modern life and leave out the bad ones.

He also argued that Palestine could support a far larger population than was generally believed. The second edition of his book on the country's absorptive capacity, published in 1930, set out the conditions under which it could hold eighteen million Jews. In farming he wanted intensive methods that could keep a family on a small plot, but he refused to stop at farming and worked out a detailed scheme resting on industry and crafts, on trade and on other town occupations. His preference for industry over agriculture, like his "Zionist maximalism", met strong resistance within the movement, although a Zionist tribute of 1930 judged that many of his suggestions had borne fruit. From 1911 he supported the practical Zionists in the leadership, but differences soon appeared and he set himself against Arthur Ruppin's methods of settlement.

== Palestine, death and reception ==
In 1926 he spent a couple of months in the United States working for a settlement company. The Jewish Telegraphic Agency reported that he had laid a plan before the Palestine Homestead Building and Land Corporation, capitalized at $300,000, to settle three hundred American Jewish families in Palestine, each of them self-supporting and in need of no charity. The corporation was to advance each settler 70 percent of what he needed and take repayment in small instalments, and the settlers, who were artisans and small businessmen, were to live by poultry and market gardening. Sixty families were to sail first and the remaining two hundred and forty later. He made the move himself in 1932, settling in Tel Aviv.

In 1933 he took part in founding Ramot HaShavim, north of Tel Aviv, established by middle-class German immigrants. Poultry farming on his model was the main enterprise and modern American equipment was introduced early.

He had married Emma (Esther) Thomaschewsky (1876–1933) in 1906 and they had five children, among them Emanuel Trietsch (1913–2001), who became a water engineer. The couple lived in the German Colony in Jaffa during his two years in Palestine, where she worked as a correspondent for the Anglo-Palestine Company, as her elder sister Hulda had done since 1904. Hulda was married to the physician and writer Theodor Zlocisti, and the two couples had met at the First Zionist Congress in 1897. His wife had been an active Zionist since the movement's early years. She stayed behind in Berlin when he and the children left for Palestine and she died there in 1933 without having followed them. Ha'aretz reported her death on 3 May and said her remains were to be brought to Palestine for burial.

After Adolf Hitler's rise to power in 1933 he again pressed for Jewish immigration to Cyprus and continued to do so until his death. In 1934 he brought out a last book, on rescuing the Jews through the building of Palestine, and in the same year he moved from Tel Aviv to Ramatayim. He struggled with considerable financial difficulties at Ramot HaShavim in his final years.

He died on 31 January 1935 at Ramatayim, having declined to be treated at his Tel Aviv flat because he wished to be attended by his friend the physician Dr Steinitz. He was buried at the cemetery in Magdiel. A year later a gravestone was set on his grave and a garden at Ramot HaShavim was named for him.

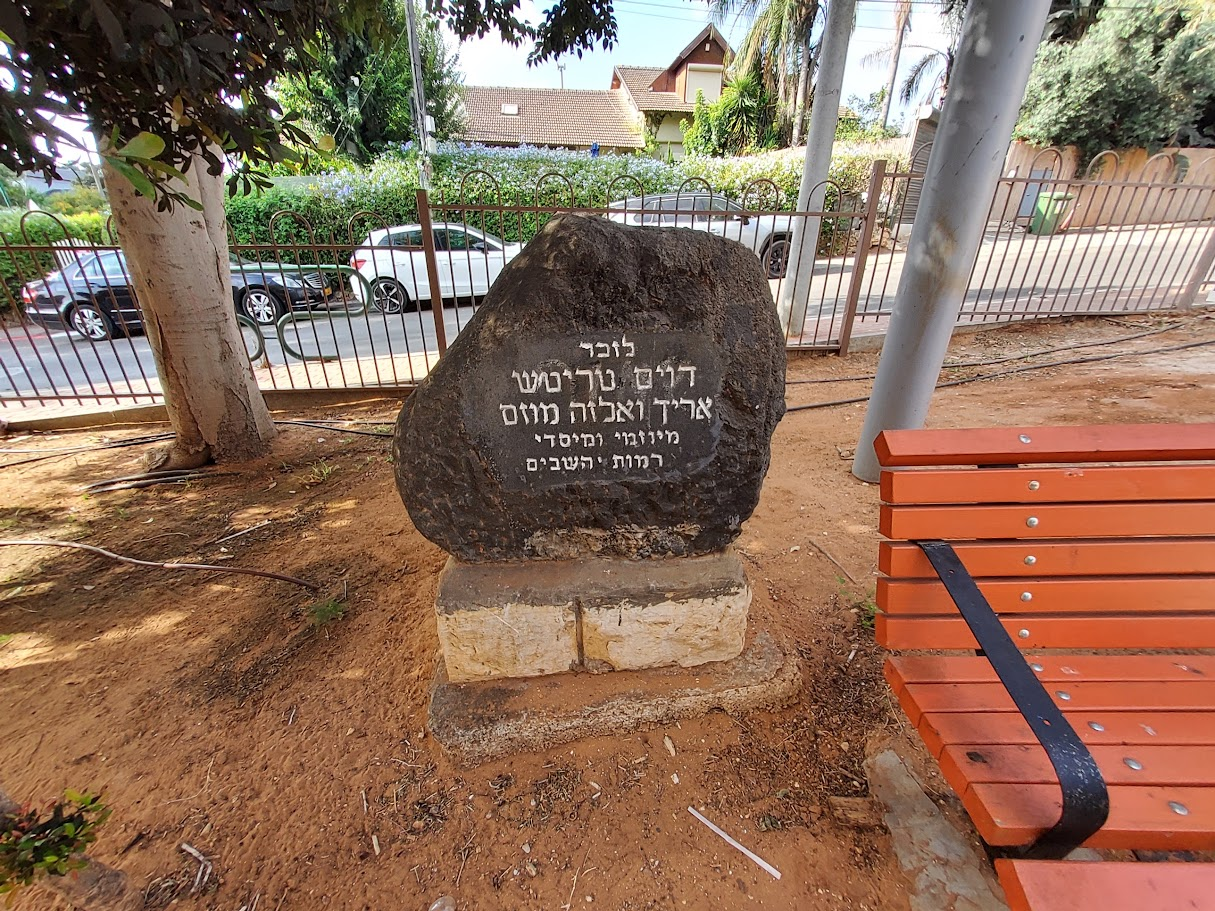
The memorial at Ramot HaShavim to Trietsch and to Erich and Elsa Moses.

A sketch of him at the Twelfth Zionist Congress in 1921, written for the New York Yidishes Tageblat by Y. Wartsman, called him the eternal plan-maker, always certain that his own scheme was the only remedy for Jewish troubles and always arriving loaded with statistics. Wartsman wrote that the congress stayed cold to his projects, that he did better one to one with his pockets full of drawings and that he would never grow tired of congresses.

By 1930 he had withdrawn from political life, though a tribute that year recorded that his attachment to Palestine was undimmed despite many personal disappointments and that he was liked for his ready wit and an obstinate critical streak.

Trietsch was largely forgotten after his death. He is absent from Gerhard Holdheim's Zionistisches Handbuch of 1923, is passed over by Arthur Ruppin and is mentioned only in passing in Richard Lichtheim's history of German Zionism of 1954. Writing in 1947, the Tel Aviv daily HaMashkif called him one of the interesting and forgotten figures in the history of Zionism and said his death had left no impression on Jewish and Zionist public life, although much of what he had urged about settlement, urban as well as agricultural, had only lately been put into practice.

In her 2022 study, the first devoted to him, Gebhard describes him as "an important forerunner", driven by a "tireless urge to create" and a "utopian, often combative wealth of ideas", whose practical results nonetheless remained limited.

She finds that he lacked entrepreneurial talent and a feel for strategic alliances and that several of his partners considered him unreliable. The Jewish satirical paper Schlemiel had made a similar remark just after the First World War, writing that his ideas sometimes had a success but that he himself never did.

== Selected works ==
- Palästina-Handbuch. Berlin: Orient-Verlag, 1907 (five editions to 1922; first published in Hebrew, and also in English and Lithuanian).
- Bilder aus Palästina. Berlin, 1911.
- Cypern. Eine Darstellung seiner Landesverhältnisse, besonders in politischer und wirtschaftlicher Beziehung. 1911.
- Deutschland und der Islam. Eine weltpolitische Studie. 1912.
- Die Juden der Türkei. Leipzig: Veit, 1915.
- Jüdische Emigration und Kolonisation. Berlin: Süsserott, 1917.
- Der große Plan zum Aufbau Palästinas. 1919.
- Atlas der jüdischen Welt. Berlin, 1926.
- Die Fassungskraft Palästinas. Berlin: Orient-Verlag, 1926.
