= Ignacy Daszyński =

First Prime Minister of Poland

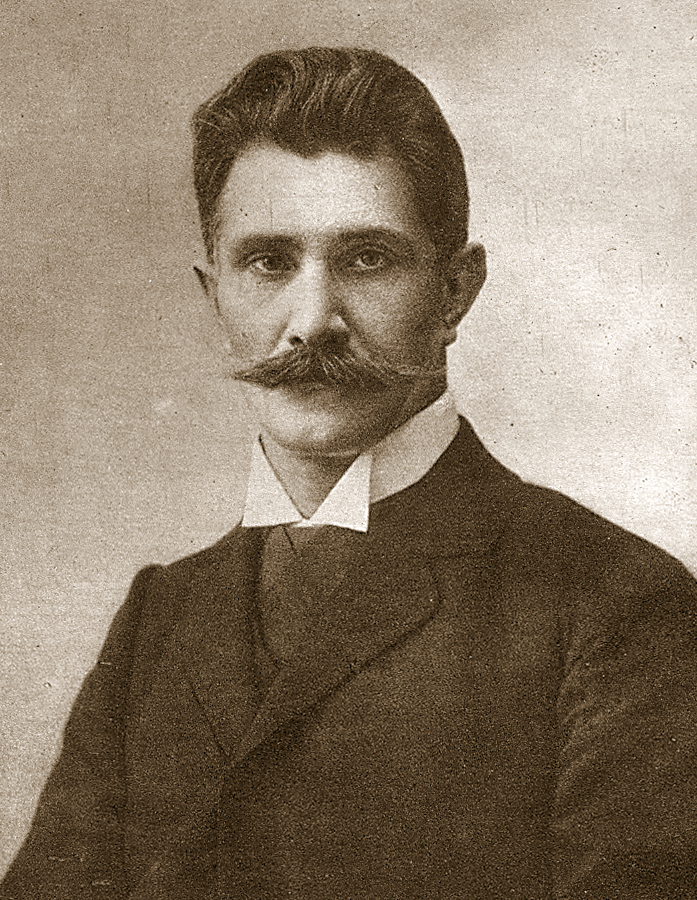

Prime Minister of Poland
- In office 6 November 1918 – 14 November 1918
- President: Rada Regencyjna (Regency Council)
- Preceded by: Władysław Wróblewski (As Prime Minister of the Regency Kingdom of Poland)
- Succeeded by: Jędrzej Moraczewski (As Prime Minister of the Second Polish Republic)

Deputy Prime Minister of the Second Polish Republic
- In office 24 July 1920 – 4 January 1921
- Prime Minister: Wincenty Witos
- Preceded by: Tomasz Nocznicki
- Succeeded by: Stanisław Głąbiński

3rd Marshal of the Sejm
- In office 27 March 1928 – 8 December 1930
- President: Ignacy Mościcki
- Prime Minister: Józef Piłsudski; Kazimierz Bartel; Kazimierz Świtalski; Kazimierz Bartel; Walery Sławek; Józef Piłsudski; Walery Sławek
- Preceded by: Maciej Rataj
- Succeeded by: Kazimierz Świtalski

Personal details
- Born: Ignacy Ewaryst Daszyński; 26 October 1866 Zbaraż, Austria-Hungary
- Died: 31 October 1936 (aged 70) Bystra, Poland
- Party: Polish Socialist Party
- Occupation: Politician

Ignacy Ewaryst Daszyński (pronounced [iɡˈnatsɨ daˈʂɨj̃skʲi]; 26 October 1866 – 31 October 1936) was a Polish socialist politician, journalist, and very briefly Prime Minister of the Second Polish Republic's first government, formed in Lublin in 1918.

In October 1892 he cofounded the Polish Social Democratic Party (Polish abbreviation: PPSD), a precursor to the Polish Socialist Party (PPS). In 1897 he was elected to the Austrian Parliament and remained there until 1918.

From 1903 he took part in several congresses and gatherings of the International Socialist Party, advocating for the independence and reunification of all Polish territories, as an integral part of the Polish socialist program. In 1912 he began a long collaboration with future Marshal and Chief of State Józef Pilsudski. He was appointed editor-in-chief of the Socialist newspaper Naprzód (Forward), published in Kraków.

Following World War I, Daszyński cofounded the Polish National Committee, and for a few days served as head of the Provisional People's Government of the Republic of Poland formed in the city of Lublin on 7 November 1918. On 26 January 1919 he was elected to the Polish Sejm, and was re-elected in 1922, 1928, and 1930. From July 1920 to January 1921 he served as deputy prime minister in a Government of National Unity led by politician and diplomat Wincenty Witos.

Though he strongly supported Józef Piłsudski during the May 1926 Coup, he later joined the center-left opposition. From 1928 to 1930 he was the third Marshal of the Sejm. When Piłsudski entered the Sejm chamber, accompanied by a sizable military escort, Daszyński refused to open the Sejm session. He ended his political career in 1930 when Piłsudski dissolved the Sejm.

In his journalistic and underground activities, he used the pseudonyms Daszek, Żegota, and Ignis.

== Childhood ==
Ignacy Daszyński was born on 26 October 1866 in Zbaraż in the Kingdom of Galicia and Lodomeria (now in Ternopil Oblast), which, following the Partitions of Poland, was then a part of the Austrian Empire. He came from a not very wealthy family of the gentry, one that cherished patriotic traditions. He was the son of Ferdynand Daszyński (1816–1875), an Austrian clerk, and Kamila, née Mierzewska (1834–1895). He had three brothers, one sister, and older half siblings from his father's first marriage.

In 1872 Daszyński began his education in a school run by Franciscans in Zbarazh. He was a very good student because he already knew how to read and write and, as he grew up in a multicultural environment, he knew several languages. From childhood, he could speak Ukrainian and Yiddish and understood German. On 6 December 1875, his father died and the family moved to Stanisławów. To improve their financial situation, his mother leased flats to secondary school students. Two years later, he entered secondary school. During this time he earned money by giving his colleagues private lessons.

At that time, he was under the strong influence of his older brother, Feliks, who taught him how to be a good Polish patriot. Together they performed minor subversive actions. Feliks wrote an anniversary poem in honour of Maurycy Gosławski, a poet who fought in the November Uprising. Ignacy made copies of the poem and scattered them around the poet's grave. The Austrian police started an investigation and Feliks was arrested, while Ignacy was released pending trial. However, they were both acquitted. Feliks still did not abandon his subversive activity. He created a conspiratorial group that drew Polish and Ukrainian teenagers from the Stanisławów area. Ignacy contributed to the group by establishing its rules.

In 1882 Ignacy Daszyński gave a patriotic speech to students during the long school break. This brought his expulsion from the school and an end to his family's easy life in Stanisławów. Their financial situation collapsed, and they had to move to Lwów. Feliks began studying chemistry at the Lwów Polytechnic. Soon Ignacy and his mother had to move again. They went to Drohobycz, where he began his first job, as a lawyer's secretary (no school was willing to enroll him). During this time he came into contact with the working class for the first time. Soon he started to write for the leftist biweekly Gazeta Naddniestrzańska (Dniester Gazette), in which he wrote about the hard conditions of workers employed by the petroleum industry in Stanisławów and Drohobycz.

The atmosphere of Drohobycz was calling me to rebel. The brutality of the sinister rascals who were then making their careers in Drohobycz was so evident and public that you did not have to be a socialist to hate their felonious "production" based on the natural treasures of Mother Earth and on the unbridled exploitation of several thousand peasants who dug up the mineral wax in Borysław.

In September 1884, when his mother moved to Przemyśl, Ignacy was left alone in Lwów. Again he was refused enrollment at school, and so studied at home.

== Politics and diplomacy ==
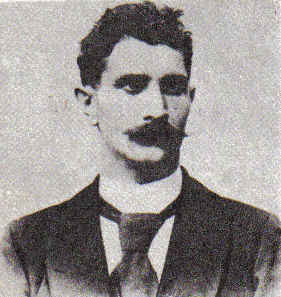
Daszyński, c. 1905

At that time, Daszyński's socialist political views were already taking shape. In 1886, he became a tutor to some friends of his parents. On 8 April 1888, he was allowed to pass the Matura (school leavers' examinations) without attending the classes. He received his diploma on 22 September 1888 and went on to study philosophy at the Jagiellonian University in Kraków. Thanks to his brother Feliks, he was in touch with socialists in Kraków. In 1889, he met Ludwik Kulczycki, whom he helped in delivering socialist brochures in Congress Poland.

Daszyński soon had to abandon his studies because of financial problems. He became a tutor again, working under a false name for the Gniazdowski family from Czarnostaw. On the night of 2–3 May 1889, he was arrested by the Russian police and spent six months in jail in Pułtusk because he was mistaken for his older brother Feliks, who was engaged in the socialist movement abroad (he attended the Congress of the Second International in Paris). When Ignacy was released from jail he was expelled from Congress Poland and returned to Kraków. While there, he was accused of engaging in illegal political activities, but was acquitted under a statute of limitations. He returned to university, but had to give up his studies after taking part in a demonstration.

After these events, Daszyński decided to emigrate to Argentina. However, before leaving Europe he went to Switzerland to visit his brother Feliks and his wife Zofia. His brother had tuberculosis and was taking a cure in Davos. After meeting his brother, he went to Paris to buy a ticket to sail to Argentina, but on 9 April 1890 he was informed of Feliks's death. After this, Stanisław Mendelson and Aleksander Dębski persuaded him not to emigrate. He decided to study in Switzerland and was admitted to the University of Zurich. During his studies there, he was supported by Mendelson, who gave him 60 pounds per month.

In Switzerland, Daszyński continued his brother's socialist activity. He was one of the founders of the Polish Working Class Association "Zgoda" (Stowarzyszenie Robotników Polskich "Zgoda"). He collaborated with Julian Marchlewski, Rosa Luxemburg and Gabriel Narutowicz. His greatest achievement at that time was the creation of order-keeping services that protected socialist demonstrations. The ceremony of moving Adam Mickiewicz's ashes to Poland turned into such a demonstration, during which Marchlewski gave a speech.

Daszyński returned to Poland in October 1890. First he stayed in Kraków, then moved to Lwów, where he created a management center for the socialist movement in Galicia. He collaborated with Ukrainian socialist activists and attended the founding meeting of the Ruthenian-Ukrainian Radical Party (Rusko-Ukraińska Partia Radykalna), where he met the poet Ivan Franko.

=== Social Democratic Party ===
Daszyński wanted to unite all the working-class movements of Galicia. Particular groups were connected with two newspapers, Praca and Robotnik; he himself was a Praca journalist. At a meeting on 7 November 1890 in Lwów, socialist activists decided to create an official and legal Labour Party. The next step was to establish a new socialist poverty-relief and educational association, Siła ("strength" or "force"), on 15 February 1891. When the organization grew bigger, its presence reached Stanisławów and Kraków. At that time, he was very active as a journalist and politician. He delivered speeches at many rallies, such as the election rally on 1 May 1891 in Lwów, and he published a political brochure, O partiach politycznych w Galicji ("On the Political Parties in Galicia"), under the pseudonym Żegota on 30 April 1891. After its publication, he was charged with affiliation with an underground organization, but, since the Socialist Party was legal, the charge was dismissed. In June he became a Galician delegate at the Congress of the Social Democratic Workers' Party of Austria in Vienna.

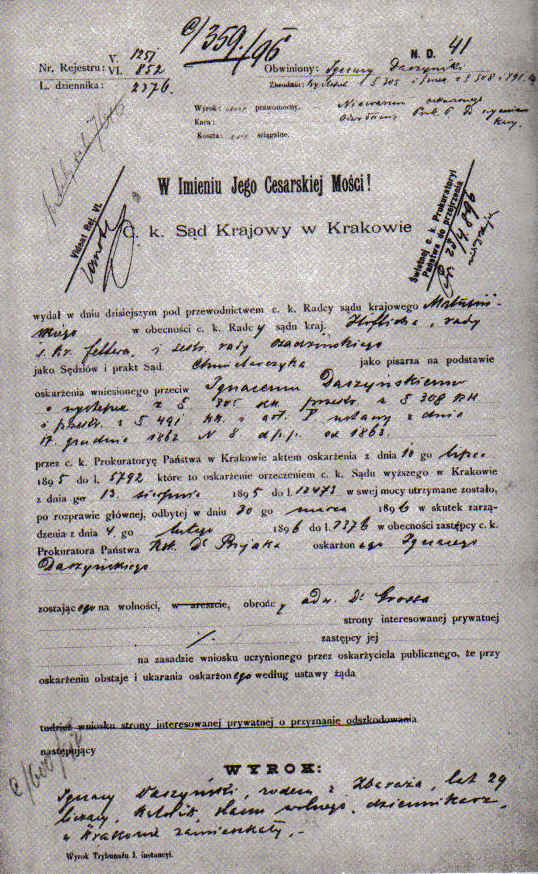
Sentence on Daszyński, 1896

From 16 to 23 April 1891, Daszyński led a delegation of Polish socialists to the Congress of the Second International in Brussels. He then went to Berlin, where he became editor-in-chief of the Polish newspaper Gazeta Robotnicza ("Workers' Gazette"). He worked there for six months. When he was leaving Berlin, he was arrested by the German authorities on charges of publishing seditious articles. However, since they could not prove that he was in fact their author, he was released.

In early 1892 he went to Lwów, where he played an important role in the first convention of the Polish Social Democratic Party of Galicia (I Zjazd Galicyjskiej Partii Socjalno-Demokratycznej). He delivered a speech about the party's political program and tactics. On his way back, he was arrested again and spent ten days in jail in Kraków. On his release, he returned to Lwów.

At the Third Congress of Austrian Socialists he argued for the separation of the Polish Social Democratic Party from the numerous Austrian organizations emphasizing pro-independence clauses in the party's Marxist political program, which aimed to put socialism into practice by abolishing private property. The first steps to achieve this aim were to be democratization of the election procedures (liquidation of privileges of the bourgeoisie) and introduction of an eight-hour working day. His dream of a separate Polish party partially came true when, in 1892, the Polish Socialist Party (Polska Partia Socjalistyczna or PPS) was created.

Daszyński met and fell in love with Felicja Nossig-Próchnik, with whom he allegedly had a son, Adam Próchnik. Between 1892 and 1893, Daszyński lived in the Carpathian Mountains, where he was resting. In 1893 he moved to Kraków, where he became editor of the socialist newspaper Naprzód ("Forward"). In March 1893 he attended the Second Socialist Congress in Kraków. The police broke up the meeting, and he spent five days in jail. In October he moved to Lwów again, where he published the brochure Krótka historia rozwoju partii socjalistycznej w Galicji (od maja 1890 do 1 maja 1894) ("A Short History of the Development of the Galician Socialist Party (from May 1890 to May 1894)"). Meanwhile, he returned to Kraków and resumed editorship of Naprzód. Later he attended the Third Socialist Congress of Galicia and Silesia and published another brochure, Bankructwo demokracji galicyjskiej ("The Bankruptcy of Galician Democracy"), in which he strongly criticized the bourgeoisie.

In 1895 Daszyński's mother died. In 1896 he attended the International Congress in London. In the autumn of 1896, the Polish Minister-President of Austria, Count Kazimierz Badeni, introduced a partial reform of the electoral law, such that 72 members of parliament were to be elected through a form of universal male suffrage. Daszyński believed that this gave a chance for socialist ideology to become more popular, as well as a chance to fight for his ideology in parliament. Constituencies were divided in such way that they included towns and villages. He was a candidate in the Kraków constituency, where he received 75% of the vote (22,214 out of 29,758 votes). He was supported by workers, peasants, students, many of them Jews. In 1897, he became a member of parliament and in the same year he married the actress Maria Paszkowska in Vienna.

=== Austrian Parliament ===
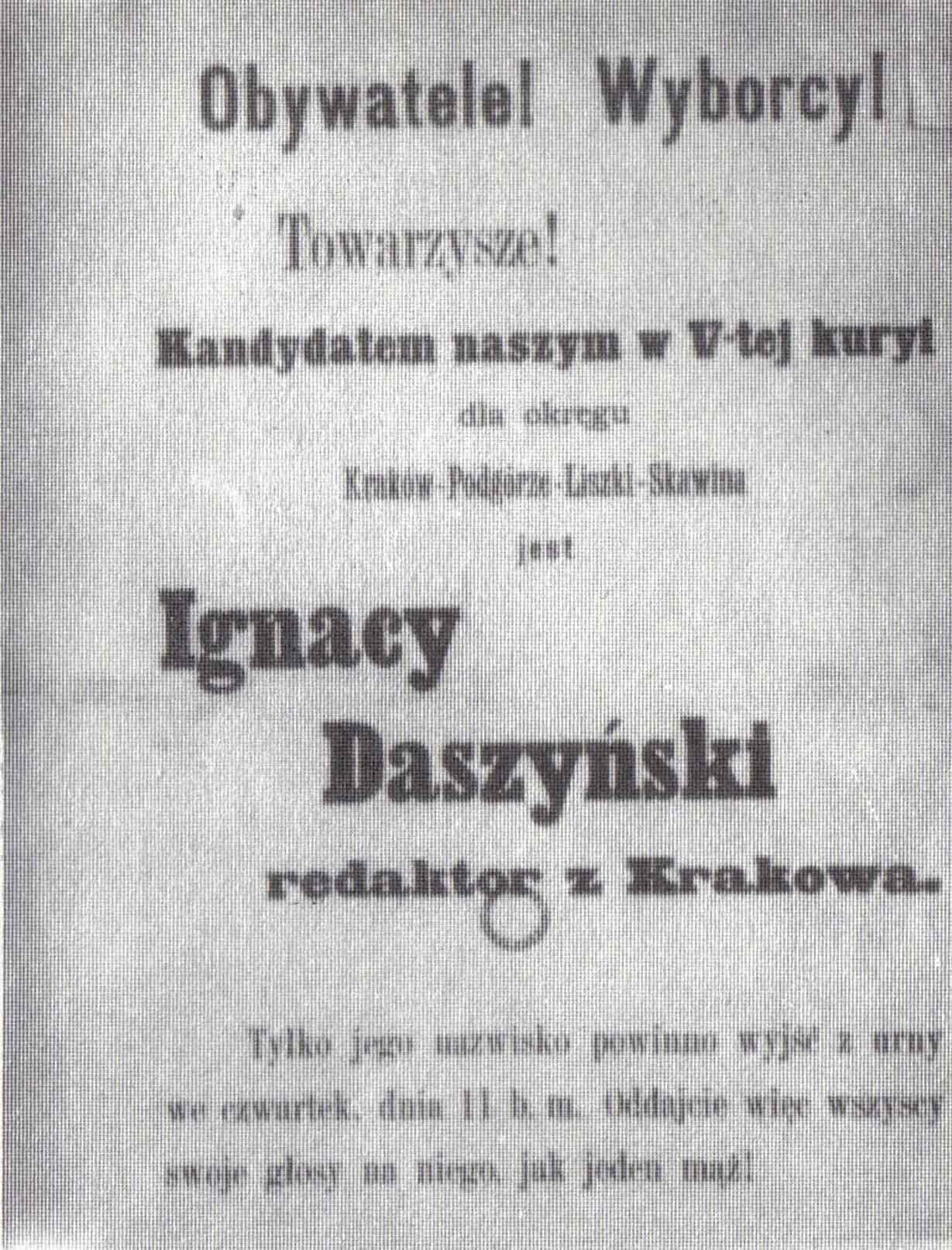
Daszyński's 1897 election leaflet

After entering parliament, Daszyński became chairman of a parliamentarian club which numbered 15 members.

In 1898, authorities introduced a state of emergency in part of western Galicia. Its aim was to weaken the workers' movement. Most liberties, such as freedom of assembly, were restricted. Daszyński fought against it, for example by giving a famous speech on 22 November, in which he protested against the government's actions. Later, he supported workers' strikes; however, he emphasized that they needed to be held legally. He also engaged in the democratization of the electoral law in parliament; among other things, he called for abolition of curial voting.

Daszyńki was a great speaker whose speeches attracted large crowds. He attacked conservatives and President-Minister Badeni. In 1898 he took part in huge demonstrations in Vienna, which resulted in Badeni being dismissed from his position by the Emperor.

In 1900, Daszyński was again elected to the Council of State. He focused his activities on circumventing censorship because, as a publicist, he was subjected to limitations on his freedom of speech.

=== Kraków City Council ===
On 12 May 1902, Daszyński became a member of the Kraków City Council. While on it, he focused on struggling against conservative and royalist members of the council.

Daszyński was also engaged in social matters and issues connected with Kraków's infrastructure. He was a member of municipal committees dealing with industrial affairs, coal and canals. On 2 February 1905, after the outbreak of the 1905 Russian Revolution, he took part in a demonstration on Kraków's Market Square, during which he burned a portrait of the Tsar. Police tried to disperse the demonstrators but failed to seize the council. In 1907, parliament passed a new electoral law allowing all men above 24 to vote in elections for the Council of State. In May of the same year, socialists achieved considerable electoral success while conservatives lost a significant number of parliamentary representatives.

== 1912–18 ==
Just before World War I, the Polish Social Democratic Party (PPSD) came to an agreement with Józef Piłsudski's Polish Socialist Party – Revolutionary Faction (PPS – Frakcja Rewolucyjna). They decided that, in the coming conflict, Poles should support the Central Powers, which could lead to the creation of a unified Austria-Hungary-Poland. Daszyński co-authored the PPSD resolution, which stated that:

As the true representatives of the Polish nation, we declare our conviction that in a prospective conflict between Austro-Hungary and Russia, whose outbreak is beyond our control, all the forces of the Polish nation should be directed against the Russian emperor, who is the irreconcilable and cruel oppressor of the great majority of our nation.

Daszyński recommended members of socialist parties to join Polish paramilitary troops. Thanks to this, these organizations were recognized as legal by the Austrian authorities. In November 1912, the PPS Revolutionary Faction and the PPSD joined the Temporary Commission of Confederated Independence Parties (Tymczasowa Komicja Skonfederowanych Stronnictw Niepodległościowych). Galician socialists were hoping to provoke an uprising after the outbreak of war in the Kingdom of Poland.

In August 1914, when World War I started, Daszyński became the deputy military commissioner in Miechów for a few days. He tried to urge the population to fight against Russia, but was unsuccessful and quickly returned to politics. After the creation of the Supreme National Committee by the parliamentary Koło Polskie (Polish Circle), Daszyński became one of the members of the Executive Department. This unit decided to form the Polish Legions.

In Daszyński's opinion, Poland should seek support from Austria-Hungary. He could not form a clear opinion of the Act of 5 November, which would guarantee the creation of an independent Kingdom of Poland. On the one hand, he was pleased that the act proclaimed Polish statehood; on the other, he felt angry that it ignored the issue of the Russian partition of Galicia. However, he participated in work on a future constitution. On 28 May 1917, he voted in the Austrian parliament in favour of a proposal from the Polish People's Party "Piast" (PSL "Piast"), claiming that "the only desire of the Polish nation is to regain an independent and united Poland with access to the sea". Influenced by the crisis and the imprisonment of Piłsudski in Magdeburg in July 1917, Daszyński became more firmly opposed to the Austria-Hungary monarchy. On 22 January 1918, he stated in parliament that Galicia wanted to become part of a united and independent Poland.

At the end of September 1918, on Daszyński's initiative, Polish members of parliament prepared and negotiated with the National Democracy movement a proposal which was introduced to the Austrian parliament on 2 October 1918, demanding restoration of an independent Polish state composed of areas from the three partitions, their own coast, and Silesia. They also recognized that the Poland issue was an international matter and called for Poland's participation in a peace conference "to decide Polish question". Daszyński gave his last speech on 3 October 1918, stating that:

All Poles declare that they want sovereignty over all three partitions brought about by the rape of Poland: all three partitions should be joined and announced as an independent country, but this unification and this independence needs to be achieved in accordance with international law in an international peace convention.

== Prime Minister of the Provisional Government ==
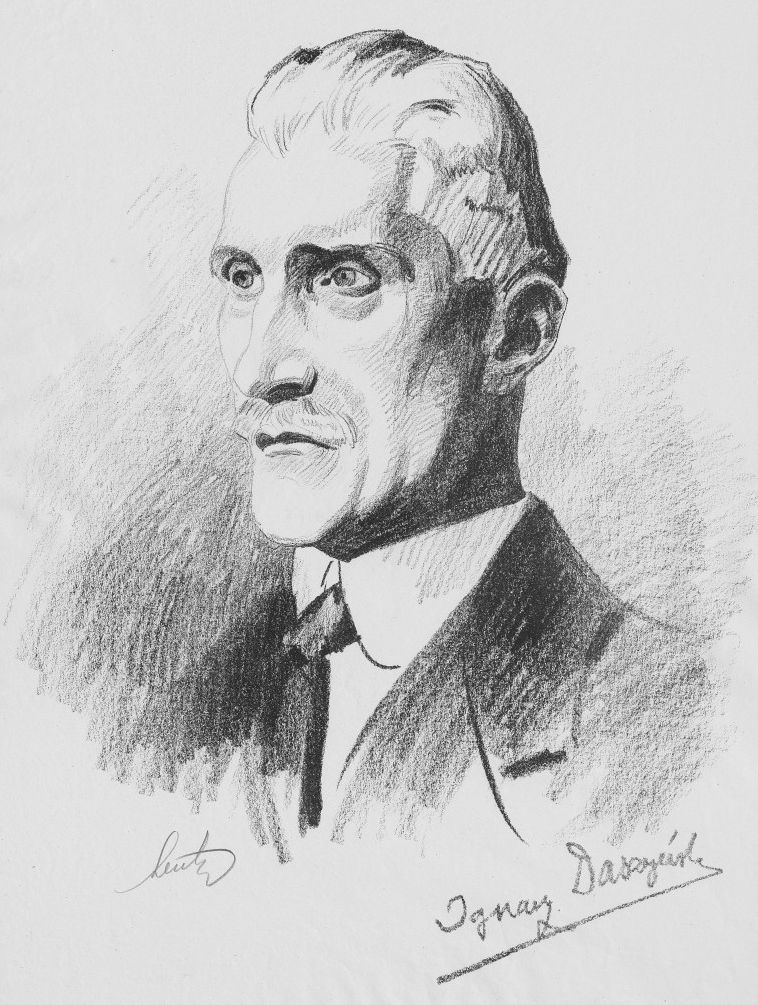
Portrait by Stanisław Lentz, 1919

On 15 October 1918 Daszyński and other Polish deputies to the Austrian parliament adopted a document in which they declared themselves to be Polish citizens. Late October brought the first signs of collapse of the once mighty Austria-Hungary. On 28 October he became a member of the Polish Liquidation Committee, which was led by Wincenty Witos and headquartered first in Kraków, then in Lwów.

On 6 November, Daszyński and others proclaimed the "Provisional People's Government of the Polish Republic" (Tymczasowy Rząd Ludowy Republiki Polskiej), based in Lublin, with Daszyński as Prime Minister. Other members of the government included Wincenty Witos, Tomasz Arciszewski, Jędrzej Moraczewski, Stanisław Thugutt, and Colonel Edward Rydz-Śmigły as military commander. The government's manifesto called upon workers and peasants to take power into their own hands and build "the edifice of an independent and united People's Republic of Poland", in which all citizens would enjoy equal political and civil rights, especially freedom of conscience, speech and assembly. Within the framework of improving social conditions, there were promises of an eight-hour working day in industry, trade and craft, and of the nationalization of mines and large estates. The future country was intended to be a democratic parliamentary republic.

Setting itself up as the legitimate representative of the Polish people, Daszyński's government called on the Regency Council to be deposed. This move was repudiated by moderate forces in Warsaw, who now hoped for a return of Józef Piłsudski, who was still in custody in Germany. Already in October, the Regency Council had requested Piłsudski's release, and after deliberations mediated by Harry Graf Kessler, Piłsudski was allowed to return to Warsaw, where he arrived on 10 November. The following day – the day Germany signed the armistice – German troops in Warsaw were disarmed as they refused to fire on Polish insurgents. Both the Regency Council and the Daszyński government ceded all authority to Piłsudski.

Piłsudski asked Daszyński to form a government, but stressed the need to "strengthen the effectiveness of his cabinet's work through participation of eminent forces, regardless of political beliefs" and forbade him to prejudice the legislative work of the Sejm by radical social reforms or other legislative changes. Daszyński accepted, but failed to form a government, and resigned on 14 November. In a letter published the next day, Piłsudski thanked him for his "truly civic work" in helping to create the first Polish government and for not hesitating "to sacrifice himself for the good of the cause in order to reach an agreement among divergent factors".

== Deputy to the Polish Sejm ==
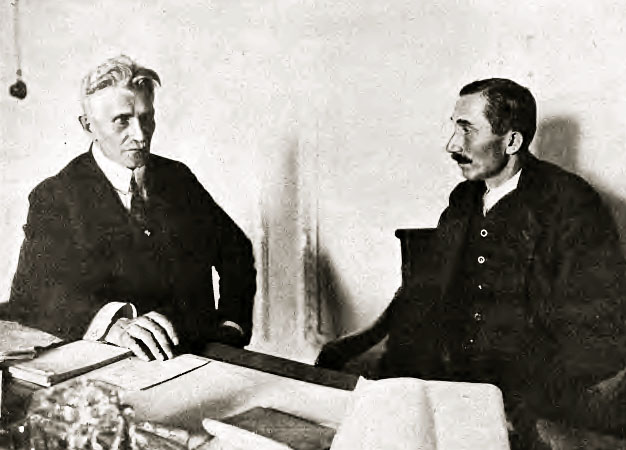
Vice Premier Daszyński and Wincenty Witos

Daszyński campaigned in the first post-war elections to the Polish Sejm, proclaiming: "The first legislative Sejm is the first administrator of Poland, its builder, the source of law and authority [in] a free, independent and united Poland." 36 members of the PPSD and PPS entered the Sejm and created a parliamentary group named Związek Polskich Posłów Socjalistycznych ("Union of Polish Socialist MPs"). Daszyński became its president.

He focused on promoting a socialist program. He advocated nationalizing some industrial sectors, for example creating state monopolies in coal and spirits. He proposed improvements in working conditions and protected workers' rights, as well as supporting development of the cooperative movement and education of peasants and workers.

On 26 April 1919, the PPSD, the PPS and the PPS Prussian Section united to form a unitary PPS. Daszyński joined its General Council and became one of its chairmen. He also edited its French-language publication Bulletin Official du Parti Socialiste Polonaise and the weekly magazine Trybuna. After the outbreak of the Polish-Soviet War, Daszyński was for concluding peace as fast as possible. He was opposed to the creation of the Council of National Defense, calling it an "abbreviation of the Sejm". However, on 24 July he joined the Government of National Defense (Rząd Obrony Narodowej) as Deputy Prime Minister (Witos was Prime Minister). He thought that this step (including peasant and socialist leaders) would increase the number of recruits. After victory in the Battle of the Niemen River, Daszyński was more and more in conflict with the rest of the government, especially with the Ministry of Foreign Affairs. He criticized diplomatic staff and Polish policy towards the East, in particular Tadeusz Rozwadowski's plans for an offensive. On 15 December, the PPS General Council asked the Prime Minister to dismiss Daszyński, but he resigned himself on 18 December. The Prime Minister accepted it very unwillingly, delaying till 4 January 1921.

After leaving government, Daszyński concentrated on working for the adoption of a new constitution. On 17 March 1921, the Sejm adopted the March Constitution of Poland, after which it dissolved itself. The socialist leader contributed to the democratic character of the constitution, for example by resisting the proposal of the conservatives that members could be appointed to the Polish Senate according to their position, without being elected.

== Vice Speaker (1922–27) ==
On 5 November 1922, Daszyński was again elected to the Sejm. He received 52,874 votes in the constituencies of Kraków County, Chrzanów, Oświęcim, Olkusz and Miechów. On 9 December Daszyński's party put him forward as a candidate for President, but he received only 49 votes. Gabriel Narutowicz was elected President, to the disappointment of the right wing (Narutowicz was elected by members who represented national minorities). On the inauguration day of the president-elect, Daszyński and Bolesław Limanowski were attacked on their way to the ceremony by right wing fighting squads, and forced to barricade themselves inside a house. Daszyński later demanded an explanation for those events. He wrote:

Polish political life cannot be an African jungle, prowled by a dozen of kinds of rogue ... Either your fascism will die smashing its head against Polish democracy, or Poland will boil with civil war.

After the assassination of President Narutowicz by Eligiusz Niewiadomski, a supporter of the National Democracy movement, the socialists planned to take revenge on right wing activists. Daszyński objected to their reasoning and forbade further escalation of the violence.

On 21 December 1922, at a meeting of the General Council, the PPS tabled a proposal to set up a nationwide worker's educational organization, the Towarzystwo Uniwersytetu Robotniczego (TUR) ("Society of the Workers' University"). On 21 January 1923, the Board of Directors of the TUR was established, headed by Daszyński. He held this position until his death. The creation of the TUR was one of his most important personal achievements. As he later described:

At the moment of Polish independence, there appeared an imbalance between preparing the masses for civil life and the possibility of adequate use of the laws that resulted in the first weeks of Polish independence. This imbalance led to the tragedy of the murder of the first President of the Republic of Poland ... At that time, the TUR came into being ... It was connected with the idea that the working class has reached such a degree of development as to be able to confront ignorance. We do not practice a party campaign (within TUR) protecting ourselves from anything that would deter our members from peaceful acquisition of knowledge.

In February 1923, Daszyński fainted while making a speech in the Sejm, resulting in his withdrawal from ongoing operations. (In September 1926 he took the floor in the Sejm again). While staying in a sanatorium, he focused on journalism and writing memoirs. Despite the state of his health, during the 19th Congress of the PPS (30 December 1923 – 1 January 1924) Daszyński was re-elected Chairman of the PPS General Council. At the 20th Congress of the PPS (31 December 1925 – 3 January 1926) he was elected yet again.

On 26 November 1925, after Jędrzej Moraczewski joined the government of Aleksander Skrzyński, Daszyński succeeded Moraczewski as Vice-Speaker of the Sejm. At first, Daszyński supported the participation of PPS in Skrzyński's government, but Skrzyński's policies (increasing unemployment, hyperinflation) and plans resulted in sharp criticism. On 20 April 1926 the PPS withdrew from the government, which soon led to its collapse. On 10 May 1926, in place of Skrzyński's government, the right-wing government of Wincenty Witos was established, to which PPS stood in opposition.

On 12 May 1926, Józef Piłsudski carried out an armed coup d'état, later known as the "May Coup". Just a month after the coup, Daszyński attacked the new government, especially its project for a new constitution that aimed to reduce the role of the legislature. Later, he published a pamlet in which he stated:

After a few years, the omnipotence of the Polish Parliament led to the collapse of the Sejm and contributed to the supremacy of the government (...) The days of May became the starting point of the growing strength and power of the government, while weakening the legislature (...) The state teeters between two abnormal and harmful statuses. It is high time we brought it to balanced and harmonious cooperation between the legislature and the executive

On 10 November 1926, at the suggestion of Daszyński, CKW PPS took a "factual-oppositional" position towards the Piłsudski government and authorities. On 20 December 1926, after a stormy debate, the PPS General Council took a similar position, indicating that:

The PPS opposition does not aim to overthrow Prime Minister Pilsudski but to reconstruct his cabinet by removing monarchist and reactionary elements and to change economic policy, which is the demand of the working class; moreover, to change internal policy, especially as far as national minorities are concerned. The future change of position of the government will be factually judged by the PPS.

The PPS had specific objections to the appointment of Vilnius conservatives Aleksander Meysztowicz and Karol Niezabytowski to the government. At this time, Daszyński headed the editorial board of the new PPS magazine Pobudka ("Reveille").

On 28 November 1927, President Ignacy Mościcki dissolved the Sejm and the Senate.

== 1927–36 ==
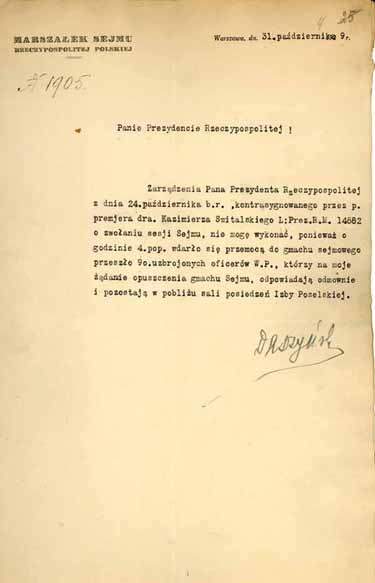
Daszyński's 1929 letter to President Ignacy Mościcki

In March 1928, the PPS obtained 14% of the votes and 64 seats in the parliamentary elections. Daszyński received 77,470 votes in his constituency (Kraków, Chrzanów, Oświęcim, Olkusz, Miechów), an increase of 50% over 1922.

On 27 March 1928, at the first meeting of the parliament, Daszyński defeated Kazimierz Bartel, the representative of the Nonpartisan Bloc for Cooperation with the Government (BBWR), and Aleksander Zwierzyński of the Popular National Union in the election for the Speaker of the Sejm. He received 177 votes in the first round and 206 in the second (54.4%). After his election, Daszyński renounced his party functions as chairman of the PPS General Council and editor-in-chief of Pobudka, but continued as head of the Board of the TUR.

The choice of Daszyński as Speaker of the Sejm aggravated relations between the government and parliament. The reason for the conflict was the "Czechowicz case", named after Treasury Minister Gabriel Czechowicz, who was accused of overdrawing the budget for 1928. Some money came from the disposable fund of the Prime Minister. However, it was used by the BBWR during the election campaign. The Sejm passed a proposal to bring Czechowicz before the Polish State Tribunal, but did not venture to bring Piłsudski himself to account for it. Despite this, in June 1928 Daszyński met Piłsudski with a proposal to form a coalition of the BBWR, the PPS and the Polish People's Party "Wyzwolenie" (PSL "Liberation"). However, Piłsudski rejected this offer. As a result, in mid-September 1929, the Centrolew, an alliance of six parliamentary groups opposing rehabilitation was created.

On 31 October 1929 there was open conflict between Józef Piłsudski and the Parliament at a meeting of the Sejm's budget session. Instead of Prime Minister Kazimierz Świtalski, Minister of Military Affairs Józef Pilsudski turned up with over a hundred army officers. The Sejm deputies thought that Piłsudski had sent the soldiers to arrest them. After the convention had assembled, Daszyński, as Speaker of the Sejm, refused to open the session. A sharp exchange between Piłsudski and Daszyński took place, which, according to General Felicjan Sławoj-Składkowski, ran as follows:

Piłsudski: Hold your tongue, please. [slams the table] I am asking whether you intend to open the session?

Daszyński: Under threat of use of bayonets, revolvers and sabers, I will not open it.

Piłsudski: Is that your final word?

Daszyński: Yes, sir.

Piłsudski: That is your final word?

Daszyński: Yes, sir.

Piłsudski: [makes a small bow and, without shaking hands with Daszyński, leaves the room. Passing through the Sejm foyer, he says loudly:] What a fool.

Versions of the conversation differ depending on the source. However, on the evening of 31 October, Daszyński issued a statement to all deputies, saying: "Under the threat of officers' sabers, I cancel today's session."

The November session of the Sejm was postponed by President Ignacy Mościcki. On 5 December 1929 the members of the newly created Centrolew passed a vote of no confidence in the government of Prime Minister Kazimierz Świtalski by 243 votes to 119.

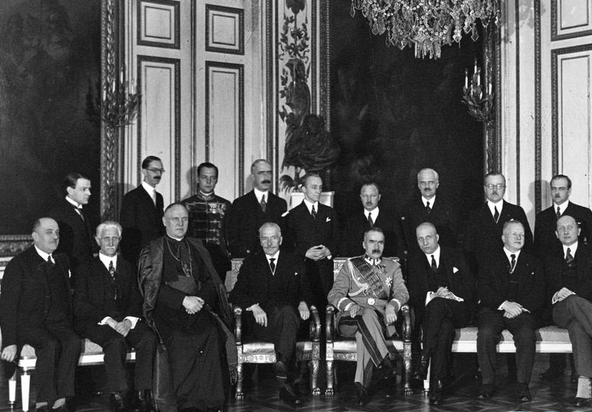
Participants at President's visit to Royal Castle. Daszyński is seated second from left.

On 29 March 1930, under pressure from members of the BBWR, Daszyński withdrew the Czechowicz case from debate in order not to escalate the conflict with Piłsudski.

On 29 June 1930, a congress on Defense of the Law and People's Freedom took place in Kraków. Daszyński sent a telegram to the congress as "the Speaker of the Sejm, condemned to inactivity".

On 29 August 1930, President Mościcki dissolved the Sejm and proclaimed new elections. Before the elections, many members were arrested and intimidated. Daszyński stood up for the detainees, sending an open letter to Irena Kosmowska, an ex-member of PSL "Liberation" who was being held in Lublin Castle.

Daszyński was a candidate for the districts of Kraków, Chrzanów, Oświęcim and Miechów. He was also the first on the national list of Centrolew. Although he got 80,000 votes, the Kraków election was annulled. Thus Daszyński was chosen as the member of parliament from the national list. After the election, his health deteriorated. After the conference of the PPS General Council on 18 January 1931, he went to the sanatorium in Bystra Śląska. He withdrew temporarily from the 12th PPS Congress (23–25 May 1931 in Kraków), but was nevertheless re-elected chairman of the PPS General Council. At the 13th PPS Congress (2–5 February 1934), he was elected honorary chairman of Polish Socialist Party. In spite of his stay in the sanatorium, he organized a "fund to fight seizures" for Robotnik.

He died on 31 October 1936, in Bystra Śląska, at the age of 70.

Many thousands came to the funeral, which took place on 3 November 1936 in Rakowicki Cemetery, Kraków. There was a special train from Warsaw and the Ministry of Transport granted free return tickets to those who went to the funeral. On the day of the funeral, everybody in every workplace stopped work for five minutes.

On 22 November, Daszyński's last letter was published:

All my life I’ve worked with workers. To them I owe the fact that my work did not come to nothing. To them with my last thought I say goodbye. I hope that their life will be better, that they will be strong and morally healthy, that they will make their common ideals come true. I say goodbye to my companions and friends with whom I have worked and I ask them to remember that time with kindness. I ask everybody to forgive me my mistakes and forget the pain that I caused. The thought of death has long been for me the beginning of freedom.

== Family ==
Felix Daszyński (1863–90), brother of Ignacy, was a journalist and social activist who married women's rights activist and senator, Zofia Daszyńska-Golińska.

Ignacy Daszyński and his wife Maria Paszkowska had five children:

- Felix, (a Second Lieutenant in the reserves, imprisoned in Starobielsk after 1939 and probably murdered in the Katyn massacre);
- Stefan (emigrated to the United States; died 1958);
- Jan (died 15 May 1940 of tuberculosis);
- Helena Rummel (died 1984 in London);
- Hanna Borkowska (secretary to Tomasz Arciszewski; died 1953 in London);

Daszyński is alleged to have had an extramarital son, Adam Próchnik (born 1894), with Felicja Nossig-Próchnik.

== Recognition ==
In 2018, at a ceremony held at the Royal Castle in Warsaw on the 100th anniversary of Poland regaining its independence, Polish President Andrzej Duda posthumously conferred the country's highest distinction, the Order of the White Eagle, upon 25 distinguished Poles including Daszyński.

== Selected publications ==
- Szlachetczyzna i odrodzenie Galicji, Lwów, 1899
- O formach rządu. Szkic socjologiczny, Kraków, 1902
- Polityka proletariatu. Kilka uwag o taktyce rewolucji w Polsce, Warsaw, 1907
- Mowa o sprawie polsko-ruskiej, wygłoszona w Izbie Posłów d. 21 maja 1908 r., Kraków, 1908
- Cztery lata wojny. Szkice z dziejów polityki Polskiej Partii Socjalistycznej Galicji i Śląska, Kraków, 1918
- Z burzliwej doby. Mowy sejmowe wygłoszone w czasie od października 1918 do sierpnia 1919 roku, Lwów, 1920
- Wielki człowiek w Polsce. Szkic polityczno-psychologiczny, Warsaw, 1925
- Pamiętniki, vol. I Kraków, 1925; vol. II Kraków, 1926
- Sejm, rząd, król, dyktator, Warsaw, 1926
- W obronie praw przedstawicielstwa ludowego. Przemówienie sejmowe tow. Daszyńskiego, Warsaw, 1926
- W pierwszą rocznicę przewrotu majowego, 1927
- Czy socjaliści moga uznać dyktaturę proletariatu, Lublin, 1927

== See also ==
- List of Poles
- Polish Socialist Party
- Second Polish Republic
