= Polish Socialists =

Political party in WWII

Polish Socialists Polscy Socjaliści
- The Three Arrows symbol used by the Polish Socialists
- Abbreviation: PS
- Chairman: Adam Próchnik (1941–1942); Henryk Wachowicz (1942); Vincent Markowski (1942–1943)
- Secretary: Stanisław Chudoba
- Professional department: Piotr Gajewski
- Founded: September 1, 1941
- Dissolved: March 1943
- Preceded by: Polish Socialist Party
- Merged into: PPS-WRN
- Succeeded by: Robotnicza Partia Polskich Socjalistów
- Newspaper: Robotnik
- Armed wing: Formacje Bojowo-Milicyjne Polskich Socjalistów (September 1941 – March 1943)
- Armed wing: Socjalistyczna Organizacja Bojowa (March 1943 – January 1945)
- National affiliation: PKP

The Polish Socialists (Polish: Polscy Socjaliści, PS) was an underground political party formed in occupied Poland during World War II by activists of the Polish Socialist Party (PPS) as an alternative to the Polish Socialist Party – Freedom, Equality, Independence (PPS-WRN).

== Background ==
The PS emerged from the PPS of the Second Polish Republic, key members of which had made preparations for the party to go underground from the mid-1930s. With the invasion by Nazi Germany these plans were adopted to a situation of occupation with guerrilla units being formed from the ranks of Socialist Action. The PPS itself was officially dissolved by its leadership, and a new clandestine party, PPS-WRN, was initiated in mid-November 1939. Despite the rapid growth of the PPS-WRN, which counted 10,000 members by the summer of 1940, several prominent figures of the PPS had effectively been purged from the new entity. Activists including Norbert Barlicki, Stanisław Dubois, Adam Próchnik, and Zygmunt Żuławski claimed the PPS-WRN was not the legitimate heir to PPS and denounced its hostile stance toward the Soviet union in the face of Nazism.

== Formation ==
Due to various political divisions the PPS-WRN withdrew from the Political Consultative Committee (PKP) in the autumn of 1941. On 1 September 1941 a rival successor to the PPS, led by Próchnik, was initiated in the form of PS, which quickly took advantage of the vacancy on the PKP.

== Dissolution ==
By 1943 PPS-WRN had changed tactics and its leadership initiated attempts to unify with PS, resulting in the break-away of the latter's military wing to align with the PPS-WRN paramilitary and Home Army. In April of that year the party was transformed into the Robotnicza Partia Polskich Socjalistów, with Piotr Gajewski as its new leader.

== Press ==
Prior to coalescing into a party claiming to be the rightful successor to the PPS, the activity of its founders was concentrated around various publishing endeavours including Barykada Wolności and Gwardia. Once established, PS produced a newspaper titled Robotnik, a continuation of the PPS pre-war publication of the same name.
