= Sheran Yeini =

Israeli footballer

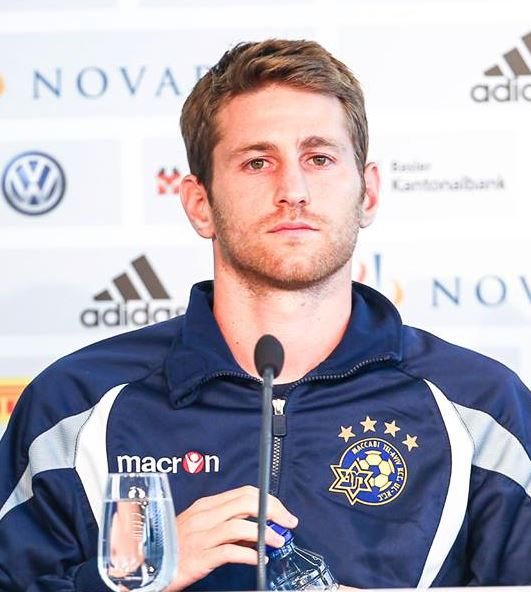
- Yeini at a Maccabi Tel Aviv press conference in 2013

Personal information
- Date of birth: 8 December 1986 (age 39)
- Place of birth: Tel Aviv, Israel
- Height: 1.77 m (5 ft 10 in)
- Positions: Defensive midfielder; centre-back; right-back

Youth career
- 1993–2004: Maccabi Tel Aviv

Senior career*
Years	Team	Apps	(Gls)
2004–2015	Maccabi Tel Aviv	232	(14)
2015–2017	Vitesse	38	(1)
2017–2024	Maccabi Tel Aviv	258	(5)
Total		528	(20)

International career
2007–2008	Israel U21	10	(0)
2013–2020	Israel	32	(0)
- * Club domestic league appearances and goals

Sheran Yeini (sometimes Sherran or Shiran, Hebrew: שרן ייני; born 8 December 1986) is an Israeli former professional footballer who spent most of his career with Israeli Premier League club Maccabi Tel Aviv, also captaining the side, and had a two-season stint with Eredivisie club Vitesse. At international level, he made 32 appearances for the Israel national team, which he also captained. Throughout his career he has played several defensive positions including defensive midfielder, centre-back, and both full-back positions.

== Early and personal life ==
Yeini was born in Tel Aviv, Israel, to a family of Ashkenazi Jewish (Russian-Jewish and Polish-Jewish) descent. His late Israeli-born father Lior Yeini (1936–2021) was a prominent singer and actor in Israel during the 1960s and 1970s. His maternal great-aunt is Israeli singer Naomi Polani, granddaughter of Zionist pioneer Dr. Chaim Chissin.

He also holds a Polish passport, on account of his Ashkenazi Jewish (Polish-Jewish) ancestry, which eases the move to certain European football leagues.

He married his Israeli girlfriend Shelly (née Aviv) on 23 May 2015, a PhD in law; and they have a daughter and a son.

== Club career ==
Yeini began his football career with Maccabi Tel Aviv's youth ranks.

=== Maccabi Tel Aviv ===
Yeini made his professional debut with the senior squad of Maccabi Tel Aviv under the guidance of coach Nir Klinger for an Israeli Premier League match against Hapoel Be'er Sheva in 2004–05.

In the 2006–07 season, Yeini served on the opening squad for 10 matches due to injuries faced by the team's star midfielder at the time: Avi Nimni. Yeini showed great ability, which lead then Israel national under-21 team coach Guy Levi to summon him up for the UEFA European Under-21 Championship campaign, where Yeini appeared in 10 games.

In 2012–13, Yeini was named team captain. For the most part, he played at right-back and has become one of the most influential players on a team that won the Israeli Premier League championship after a ten-year drought. On 26 June 2013, Sheran Yeni's contract was extended for an additional four years.

In the 2013–14 season, Yeini continued to take a significant role with the team while participating in 29 league games and 42 official games in total, en route to winning a second consecutive state championship. During that season, Yeini reached his 200th Israeli Premier League game with the senior squad, while also becoming Maccabi Tel Aviv's record holder for most caps played in European Competition. By the end of the 2014–15 season, Yeini was part of the Maccabi Tel Aviv team that has won a third straight Israeli Premier League championship along with Israel State Cup as well as the Toto Cup (Ligat Ha'Al).

=== Vitesse ===
In the summer of 2015, Yeini transferred to Eredivisie side Vitesse.

=== Return to Maccabi Tel Aviv ===
On 27 January 2017, Yeini returned to his previous Israeli Premier League club Maccabi Tel Aviv, signing a three-and-a-half-year contract.

== International career ==
Yeini was a U-21 youth international for Israel from 2007 to 2008.

He made his first international appearance for the senior Israel national team on 22 March 2013, in a FIFA World Cup 2014 qualifier match against Portugal, during which he successfully guarded forward Cristiano Ronaldo and was elected MVP of the match, that ended in a 3–3 draw (4–4 in aggregation).

As the captain of the senior national team, Yeini declared his retirement from the Israeli squad in a press conference during his last match with it, on 18 November 2020.

== Honours ==
Maccabi Tel Aviv

- Israeli Premier League: 2012–13, 2013–14, 2014–15, 2018–19, 2019–20, 2023–24
- Israel State Cup: 2004–05, 2014–15
- Israel Toto Cup (Ligat Ha'Al): 2008–09, 2014–15, 2017–18, 2018–19, 2020–21
- Israel Super Cup: 2019, 2020

== See also ==
- List of Jewish footballers
- List of Jews in sports
- List of Israelis
