= Zofia Moraczewska =

Polish politician and women's rights activist

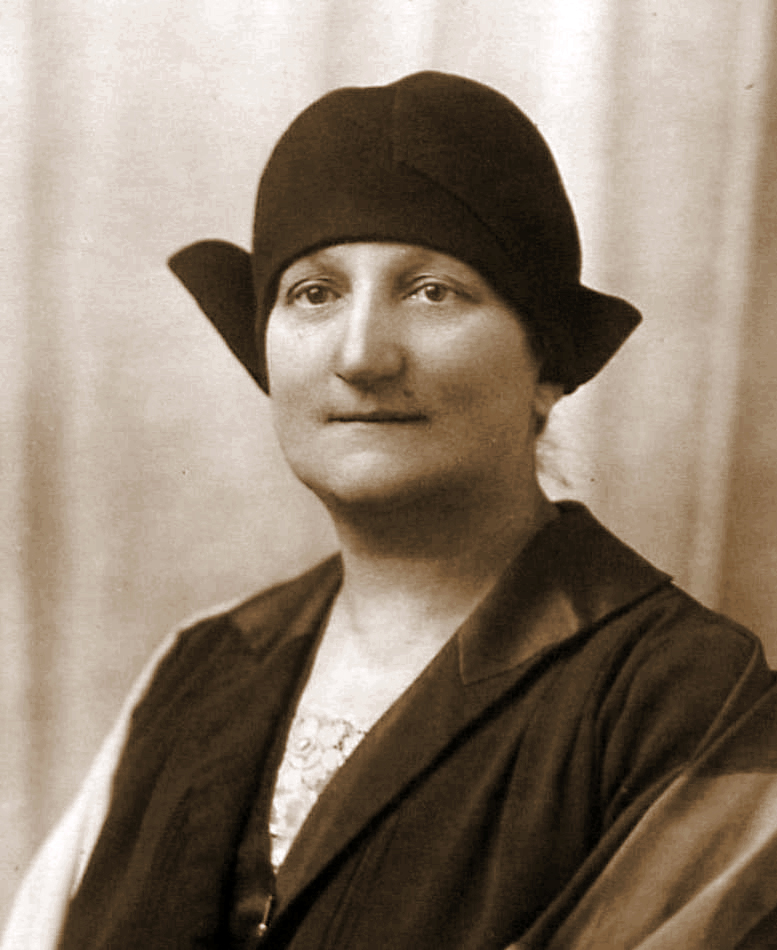
- Born: 4 July 1873; Czernowitz, Duchy of Bukovina, Austro-Hungarian Empire (now Chernivtsi, Ukraine)
- Died: 16 November 1958 (aged 85); Sulejówek, Poland
- Occupations: Politician and women's rights activist
- Spouse: Jędrzej Moraczewski

Zofia Moraczewska, née Gostkowska (4 July 1873 – 16 November 1958) was a Polish politician and women's rights activist.

== Life ==
Zofia Moraczewska was born of 4 July 1873 in Czernowitz, Duchy of Bukovina, Austro-Hungarian Empire (now Chernivtsi, Ukraine) and graduated from the Teacher's Seminary in Lemberg, the capital of the Kingdom of Galicia and Lodomeria in the Austro-Hungarian Empire (now Lviv, Ukraine), in 1893. She married Jędrzej Moraczewski three years later and joined the Social Democratic Party of Galicia (Polish: Galicyjska Partia Socjaldemokratyczna (GPS) or Polish: Socjaldemokratyczna Partia Galicji) that same year. They had four children between 1901 and 1907, although the youngest did not survive infancy. Her husband was elected to the House of Deputies of the Imperial Council in 1907, representing Stryj (now Stryi, Ukraine), and became the first Prime Minister of the Second Polish Republic for several months in 1918–19. Moraczewska was elected a member of the Sejm and was an editor for the Voice of Women (Polish: Głos Kobiet), the official newspaper of the Polish Socialist Party's (the renamed GPS) Women's Department from 1919 to 1927. One of her sons died in 1920 during the Polish–Soviet War, her husband in 1944 and her two surviving children were killed in the Auschwitz concentration camp during World War II. She died on 16 November 1958 in her home in Sulejówek.

== Activities ==
Once the couple settled in Stryj, Moraczewska founded the Women's Association (Polish: Związek Kobiet), which started a school for working women and several cooperatives. She joined the Women's League of Silezia and Galicia (Polish: Liga Kobiet Galicji i Śląska) in 1915, after the start of World War I.
