= Ramot HaShavim =

Village in central Israel

Ramot HaShavim: רָמוֹת הַשָּׁבִים (Hebrew)
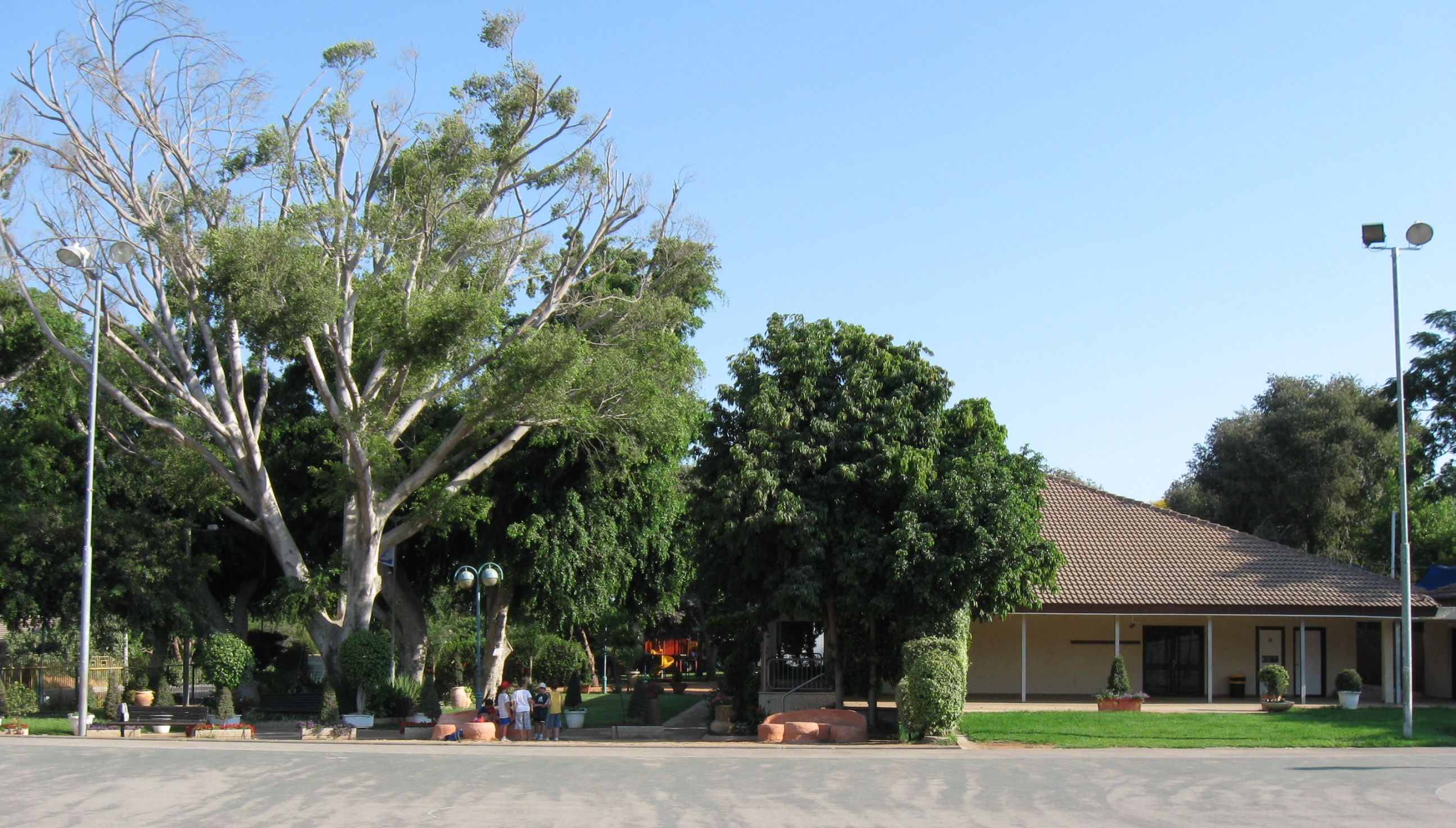

- Location within Central Israel Location within Israel
- Coordinates: 32°10′8″N 34°53′15″E
- Country: Israel
- District: Central
- Subdistrict: Petah Tikva
- Council: Drom HaSharon
- Founded: 1933
- Founder: German immigrants
- Population (2024): 1,689
- Website: www.ramot-hashavim.org

Ramot HaShavim (Hebrew: רָמוֹת הַשָּׁבִים, lit. 'Heights of the Returnees') is a Jewish village in central Israel. Located between Hod HaSharon and Ra'anana and covering around 2,300 dunams, it falls under the jurisdiction of Drom HaSharon Regional Council. In 2024 it had a population of 1,689.

== History ==
Ramot HaShavim was established as a moshav in 1933 by Jewish-German immigrants of the Fifth Aliyah.

Among its founders was the German Zionist writer and publisher Davis Trietsch, who had settled in Palestine in 1932. Poultry farming on the model he advocated became the moshav's main enterprise. Trietsch died at Ramatayim in 1935 and a garden in the village was named for him the following year.

In 1951 it became an independent local council, but as part of local government reforms in 2003 it reverted to village status under the jurisdiction of a regional council.

== Gallery ==
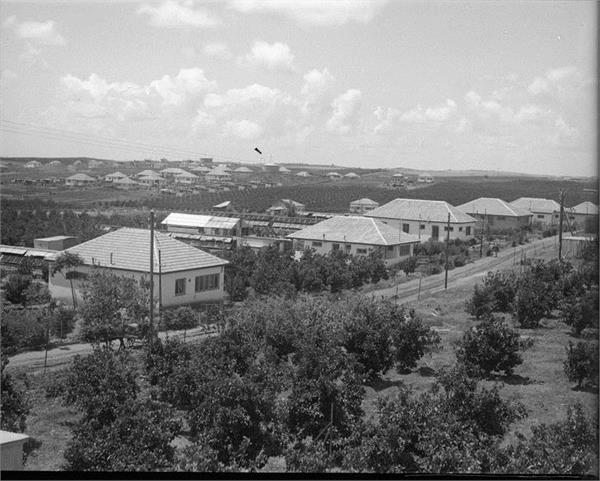
Ramot HaShavim 1937

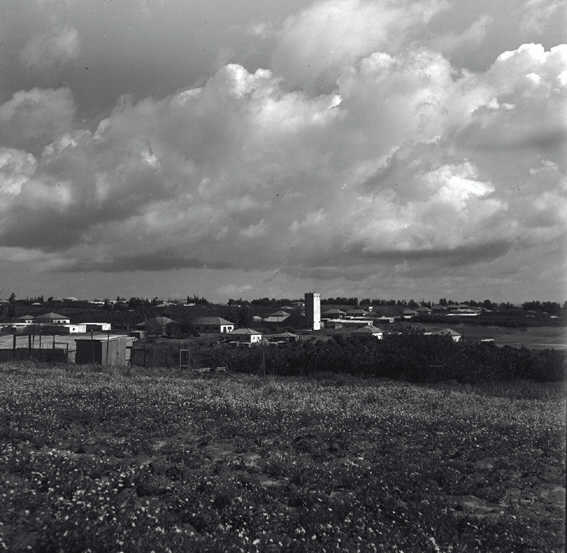
Ramot HaShavim 1945

Feinstone House in Ramot HaShavim, 2020
