= Polish Liquidation Committee =

1918–19 temporary government in Austrian Poland

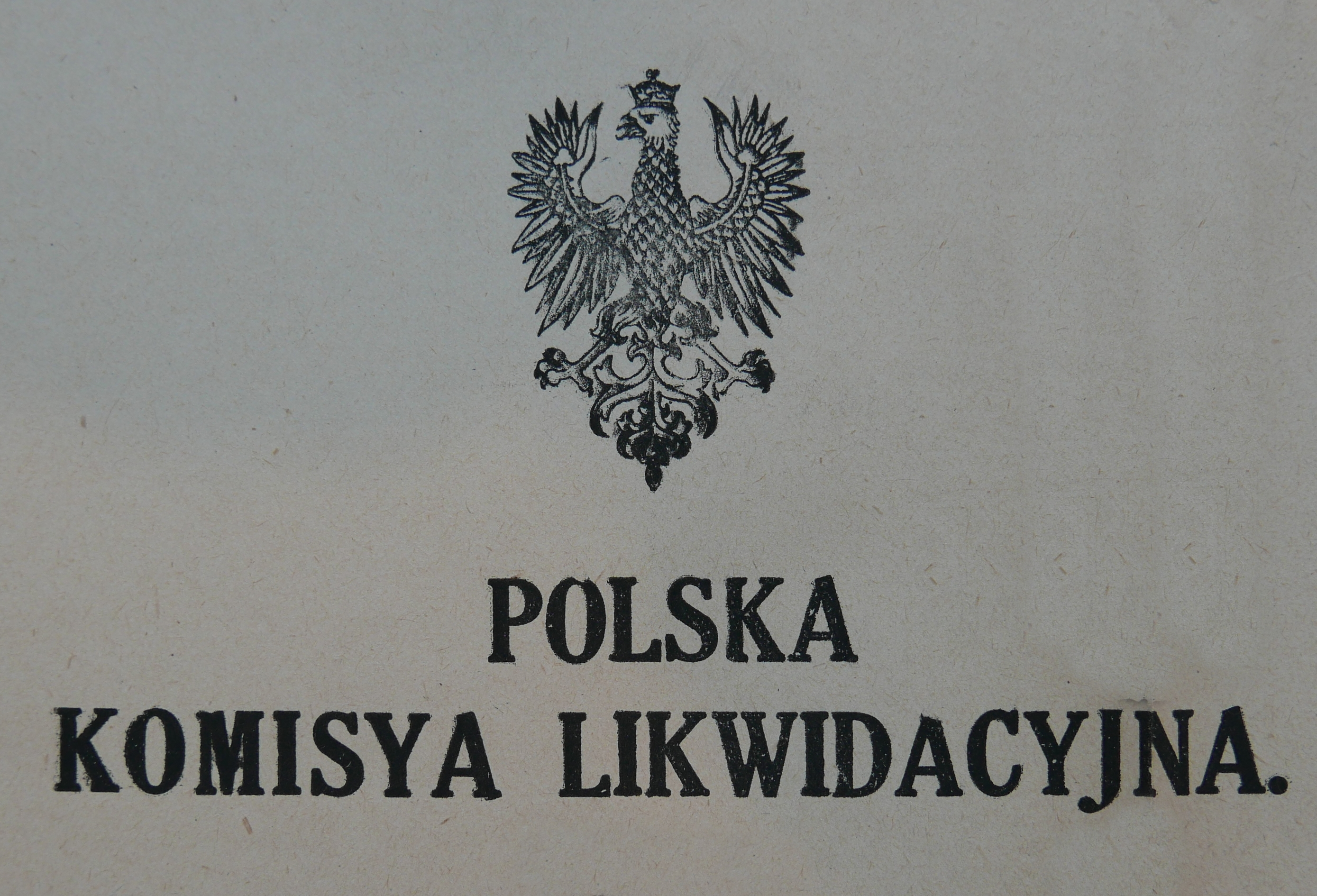
The logo of the Polish Liquidation Committee.

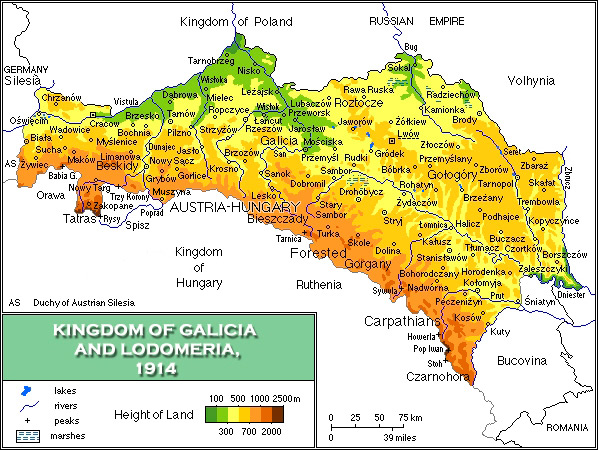
Map of the Kingdom of Galicia

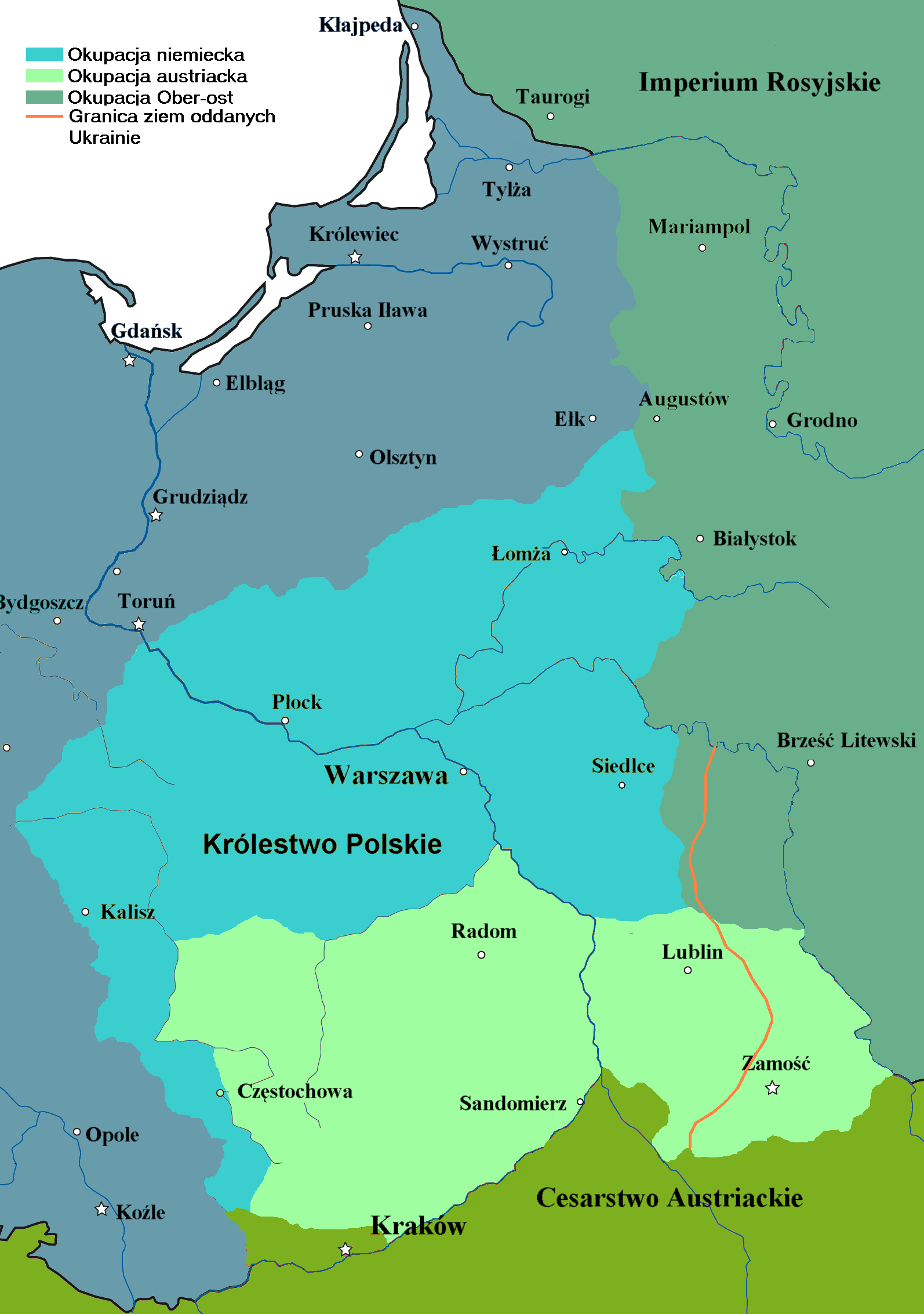
Austrian occupied part of Russian Poland in light green

The Polish Liquidation Committee of Galicia and Cieszyn Silesia (Polish: Polska Komisja Likwidacyjna Galicji i Śląska Cieszyńskiego) was a temporary Polish government body that operated in Galicia at the end of World War I. Created on 28 October 1918, with its seat in Kraków, the committee was headed by Wincenty Witos and Ignacy Daszyński. The committee aimed primarily to maintain order in the territories of the former Austrian part of partitioned Poland during the re-establishment of an independent Poland.

== Timeline ==
It was founded by Polish members of the Austrian parliament on 28 October 1918.

On 27 March 1919, the committee handed over its authority to the central Polish government seated in Warsaw.

== See also ==
- Kingdom of Poland (1917–1918)
- Poverty in Austrian Galicia
