= Wacław Tokarz =

Polish historian and military officer

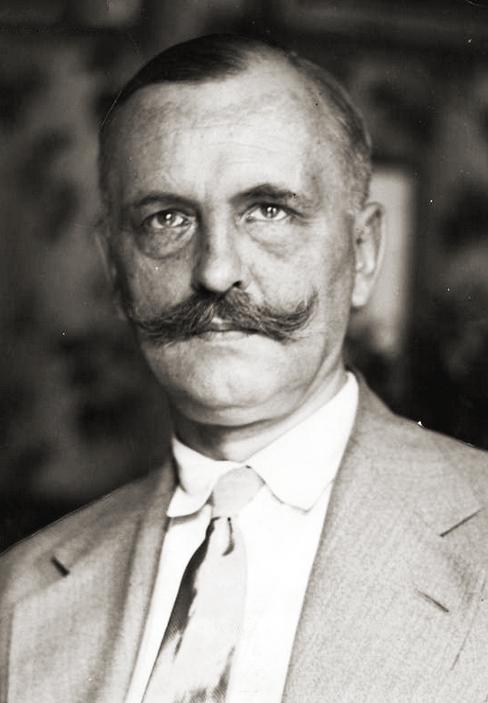
Wacław Tokarz

Wacław Tokarz (7 June 1873 in Częstochowa - 3 May 1937 in Warsaw) was a Polish historian and military officer. A Colonel of the Polish Army and a professor of both the Warsaw University and Jagiellonian University, he authored numerous books on the 19th century military history of Poland, notably two monumental monographs on the Battle of Warsaw (1831) and the Warsaw Uprising of 1794.
