= Ost und West =

German magazine (1901–1923)

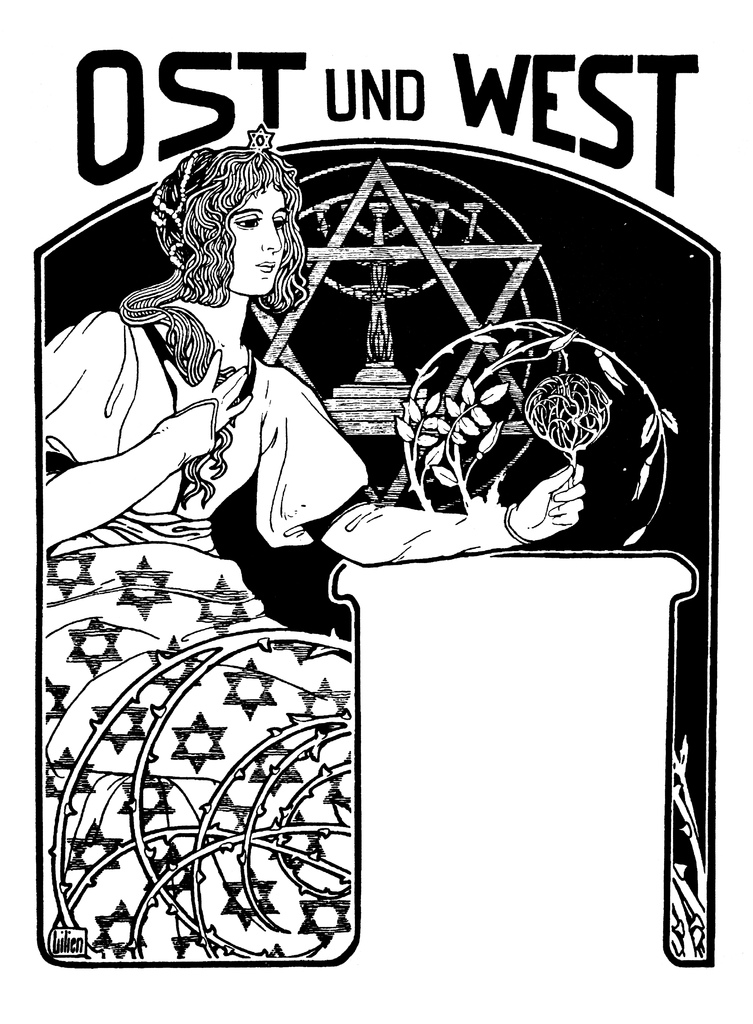
1901 magazine cover designed by E. M. Lilien

Ost und West ("East and West") was a German magazine meant to bridge cultural and political divides between Eastern and Western European Jews. The magazine, headquartered in Berlin, operated from 1901 to 1923. It was founded by Leo Winz and Davis Trietsch.

== History ==
From 1880 to 1914, hundreds of thousands of Eastern Jews migrated to Western Europe. A large proportion of this mass migration was in reaction to the Pogroms of 1881. This geographical change resulted in tension between Western and Eastern Jewish identities, as there was not a single national identity held by both despite a shared religious history. Eastern Jews faced widespread xenophobia in Germany from Western Jews. Western Jews used the derogatory term Ostjuden to refer to Eastern Jews, which stereotyped Eastern Jews as primitive and poor compared to wealthier, more educated Western Jews.

Leo Winz and Davis Trietsch founded Ost und West in 1901 in Berlin, Germany. Winz was a Ukrainian Jew and Trietsch was a German Jew. Aligned with Martin Buber's view of Judaism as a national culture, their goal was to establish a pan-Jewish ethnicity and combat Ostjuden stereotypes. Their intended audience was middle-class Jews and Jewish intellectuals. The magazine was non-partisan, although it vaguely supported Zionism. Winz and Trietsch hoped to unite all Jews, regardless of their political affiliations, through a shared ethnic nationality by remaining apolitical. In an attempt to convey a Jewish cultural resonance, the magazine also highlighted avant-garde Jewish art. It featured many etching works by Ephraim Moshe Lelain in the art nouveau style. Additionally, David A. Brenner, author of German-Jewish Popular Culture before the Holocaust: Kafka's kitsch, wrote that the magazine is an "ideal" source for evaluating the reception to Yiddish theatre in Germany especially since "studies of popular Berlin theater, including Yiddish-language theater, are few and far between".

Published authors of the magazine included: Martin Buber, Georg Hermann, Theodor Herzl, Bertha von Suttner, Nathan Birnbaum, Lothar Brieger, Hermann Cohen, Max Eschelbacher, Ludwig Geiger, Achad Haam, Gustav Karpeles, Samuel Lublinski, Max Nordau, Alfred Nossig, Max Osborn, Felix Perles, Martin Philippson, Binjamin Segel, Arthur Silbergleit, Thekla Skorra, Werner Sombart, Eugen Wolbe, August Wünsche and Theodor Zlocisti.

Trietsch left his role within the magazine after only one year. In 1902, he was among the founders of the Jewish Publishing House, which featured a range of Zionist works. Trietsch emigrated to Palestine in 1932 during the Fifth Aliyah. Winz remained in the role of chief editor of the magazine until its demise. He lived in Palestine from 1923-1925, and then emigrated permanently in 1935.

The magazine ceased in 1923 when massive inflation took its toll. It is considered a success, having reached ten percent of the Jewish population in Germany.
