= Robotnik (1983–1990) =

Polish underground newspaper

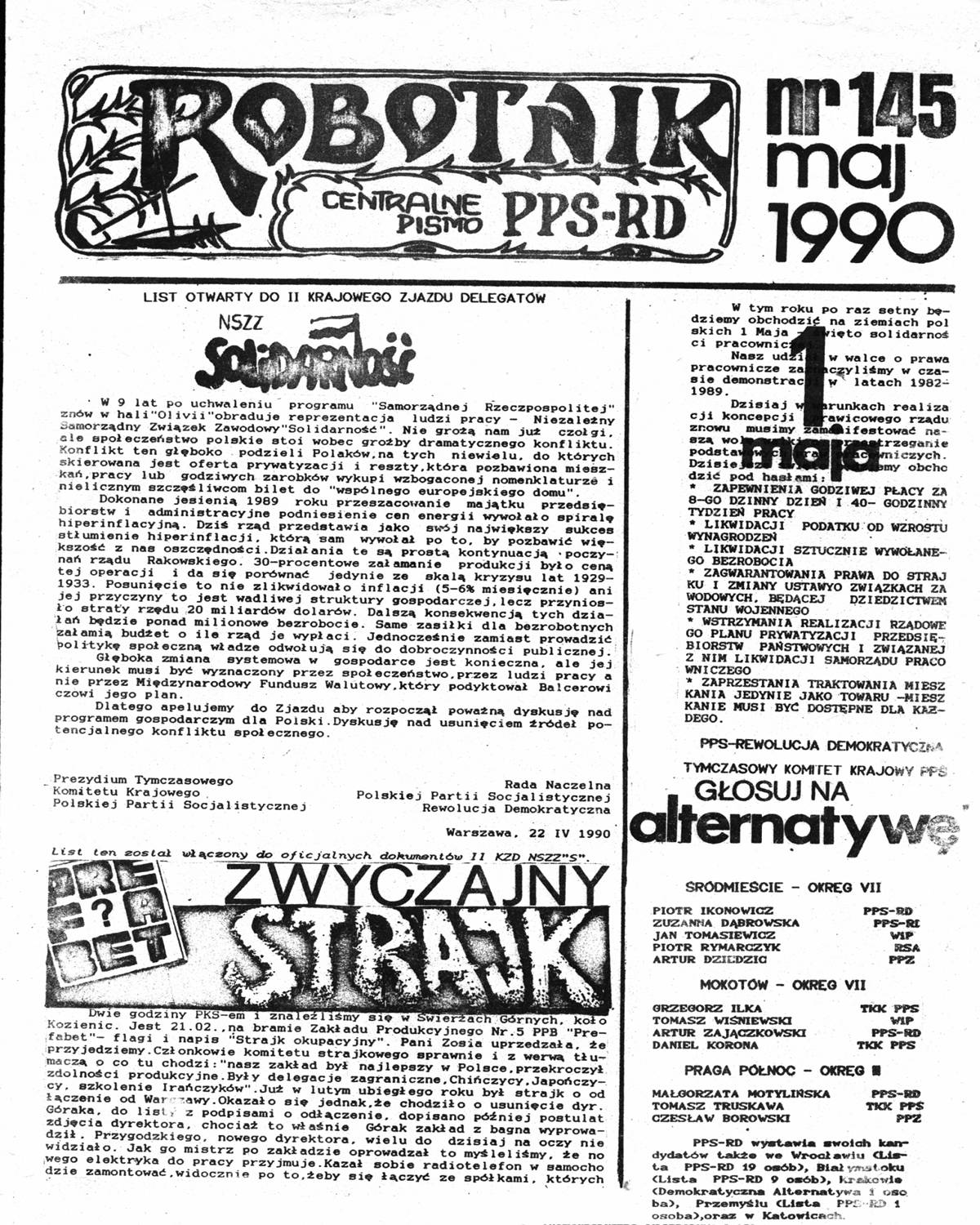
- Cover of №145, May 1990
- Format: Bibuła
- Publisher: Solidarity
- Founded: 1983
- Ceased publication: 1990
- Language: Polish

Robotnik (The Worker) was the name of an underground newspaper (bibuła) published by the democratic socialist wing of the Solidarity resistance movement in the People's Republic of Poland during the period of martial law in Poland, between the years 1983 and 1990. It was named after the Polish Socialist Party pre-war periodical of the same name.

== See also ==
- Tygodnik Solidarność
