= Chaim Chissin =

Israeli settler and diarist (1865–1932)

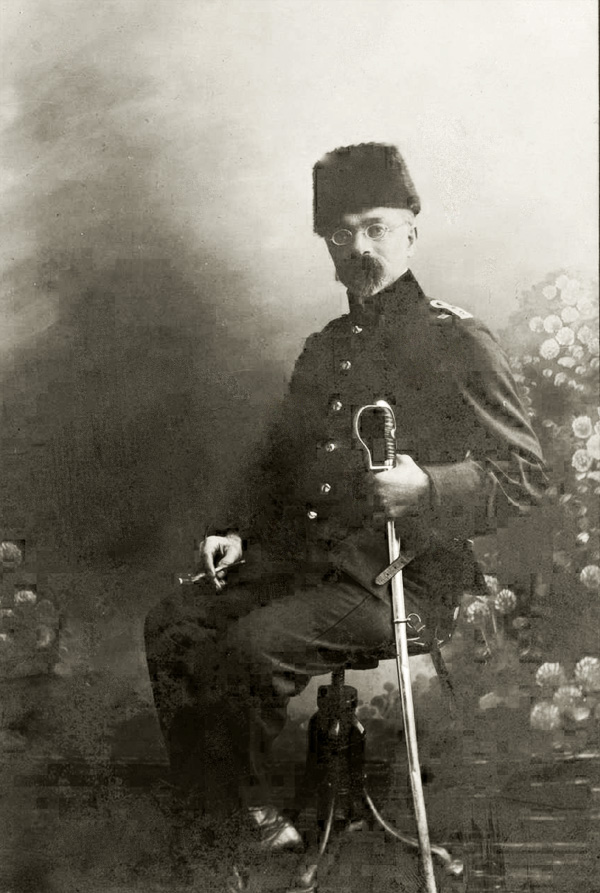
- Born: 1865; Belarus
- Died: 1932 (aged 66–67)
- Occupations: Settler, diarist

Chaim Chissin, sometimes spelt Hayyim Hisin, (1865-1932) was a Belarus-born emigrant to Palestine (now Israel), who first arrived in 1882. He was a member of Bilu, and a co-founder of Ahuzzat Bayit, later Tel Aviv. His diary was translated from Russian into English in 1976. The Jewish Journal of Greater Los Angeles noted that he wrote about his experience with "poverty and desperation."

He is the namesake of Hisin Street in Tel Aviv.

== Works ==
- Chissin, Chaim (1976). A Palestine Diary: Memoirs of a Bilu Pioneer, 1882-1887, Translated from Russian by Frances Miller. New York: Herzl Press.
