= Felicia Nossig =

Polish sociologist (1855–1939)

Felicia Nossig (1855–1939) was a Polish politician (Social Democrat), sociologist, journalist, feminist and translator.

She graduated as a teacher in 1873, and was active as a journalist from 1891, in several different publications. She was a secretary of the educational association in Lviv (1889), organized the first Women's Worker's Convention in Lviv (1892). She was a single mother and supported herself and her son on translations from Ukrainian and Russian into German from 1893. She was engaged in the Polish women's movement and often engaged as a speaker. In 1894, she studied to be a doctor in sociology in Switzerland.
