= Jędrzej Moraczewski =

Polish socialist politician

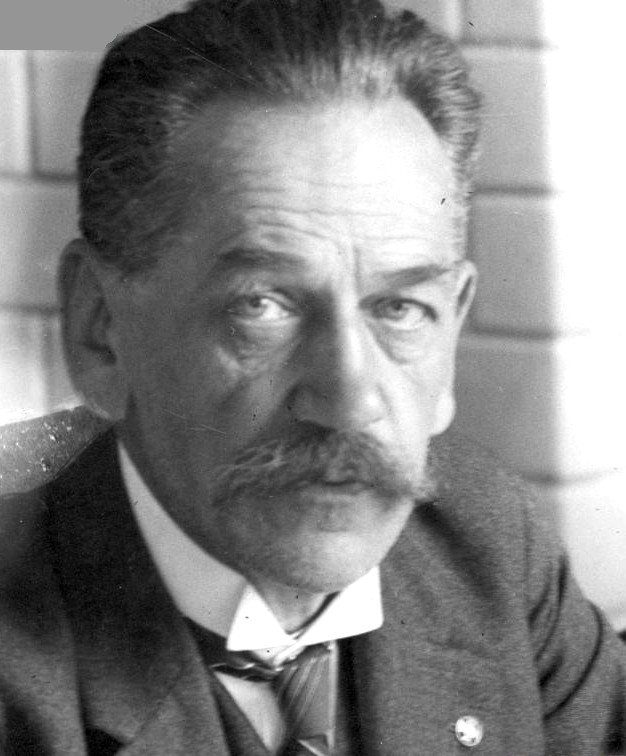

Prime Minister of Poland
- In office 17 November 1918 – 16 January 1919
- President: Józef Piłsudski (Chief of State)
- Deputy: Tomasz Nocznicki
- Preceded by: Ignacy Daszyński
- Succeeded by: Ignacy Jan Paderewski

Personal details
- Born: Jędrzej Edward Moraczewski; 13 January 1870 Tremessen (Trzemeszno), Province of Posen, Kingdom of Prussia
- Died: 5 August 1944 (aged 74) Sulejówek, General Government of Occupied Poland
- Party: Polish Socialist Party
- Profession: Engineer

Jędrzej Edward Moraczewski (Polish: [ˈjɛndʐɛj mɔraˈt͡ʂɛfskʲi]; 13 January 1870 – 5 August 1944) was a Polish socialist politician who served as Prime Minister of Poland from 1918 to 1919. was one of the leaders of the Polish Socialist Party. He had previously served as Minister of Communications. Subsequently, from 1925 to 1929, he served as Minister of Public Labour.

He was loyal to Józef Piłsudski and was viewed as acceptable by both left- and right-wing Polish political factions, served as the second Prime Minister of the Second Polish Republic between November 1918 and January 1919.

Moraczewski died on 5 August 1944 when he was hit by shrapnel fired by a Soviet soldier into his house. He was buried at Powązki Military Cemetery.

== Source publications ==
- Andrzej Chojnowski, Piotr Wróbel, ed. (1992). Presidents and prime ministers of the Second Polish Republic (in Polish). Wrocław: Ossolineum. ISBN 83-04-03854-4.

Political offices
| Preceded by Władysław Wróblewski | Prime Minister of Poland; 1918–1919 | Succeeded by Ignacy Paderewski |
