= Robotnik (1894–1939) =

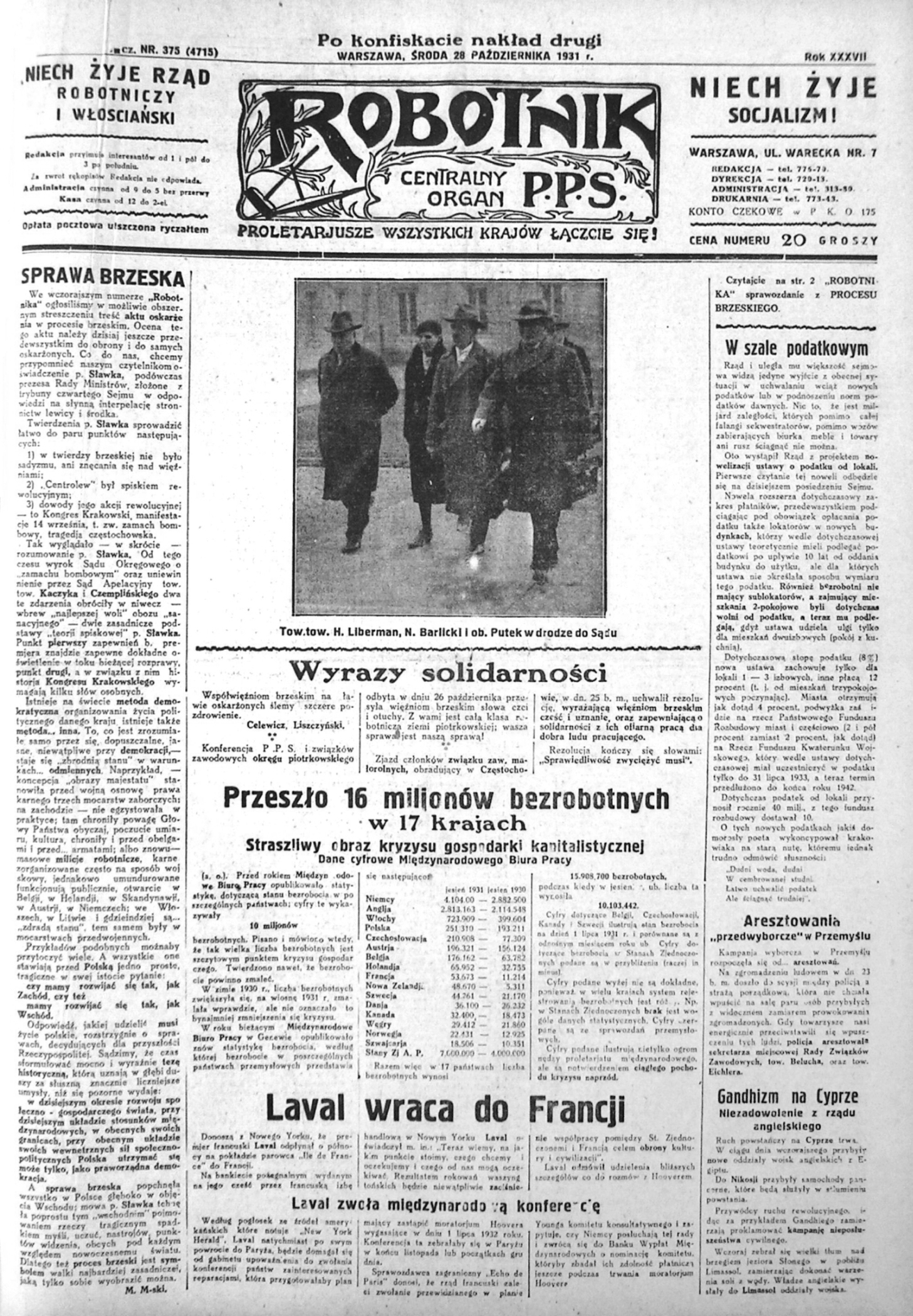
- Robotnik, front page of issue from 28 October 1931.
- Type: varied, later daily newspaper
- Founded: 1894
- Ceased publication: 1939
- Political alignment: socialist
- Language: Polish language

Robotnik (Polish pronunciation: [rɔˈbɔtɲik]; The Worker) was the bibuła (underground) newspaper published by the Polish Socialist Party (PPS), and distributed in most major cities and towns in Poland during the Partitions.

Robotnik was first published on 12 July 1894 in Lipniszki near Wilno in the amount of 1,200 copies, by the local branch of the then-illegal PPS, led by the future Chief of State of the Second Polish Republic, Józef Piłsudski. Among its other editors was Stanisław Wojciechowski, future president of Poland. In order to throw the ochrana secret police and regular Russian police off track, the newspaper was first distributed in Warsaw. Piłdsudski would become one of the chief editors and writers for the newspaper, and he often spent most of the day at the printing press. In 1900 the police managed to find the printing press, leading to the arrest, sentencing, and imprisonment of Józef Piłsudski and several other members of PPS (including his wife, Maria Piłsudska), although Piłsudski would soon escape by feigning mental illness.

In the following years Robotnik would be printed in various places by several groups of PPS, or related to it. From 1915 Robotnik was legalized; the first legal issue was printed in Dąbrowa Górnicza. From 1919 to 1939 it became a normal, legal newspaper in the Second Polish Republic. Among its editors were Feliks Perl (died 1927) and Mieczysław Niedziałkowski (1927–1939). Its notable contributors included Zygmunt Zaremba, Stanisław Posner, Karol Irzykowski, Cezary Jellenta and Jan Nepomucen Miller, and its circulation reached 10–20,000 issues. The last issue was released on 23 September 1939, in the fourth week of the Polish September Campaign.

After the May Coup (in 1926) of Piłsudski, who after the First World War distanced himself from PPS, Robotnik took an opposition stance towards his government; in return, some of its editions were subject to confiscations (only from 1926 to 1935 about 500 issues were confiscated).The journal was a strong supporter of PPS and socialism in general; among the notable policies opposed by the journal was that of antisemitism.

After the war several newspapers of that name were printed in Poland and abroad; among the most notable was another underground paper published by the Solidarity movement from 1983–1990.

The current Polish Socialist Party (refounded in 1989) published the Nowy Robotnik ("The New Worker") from 2003 to 2006.
