= Kingdom of Poland (1917–1918) =

German and Austro Hungarian puppet state

Kingdom of Poland Królestwo Polskie (Polish) Königreich Polen (German)
- 1917–1918
- Coat of arms

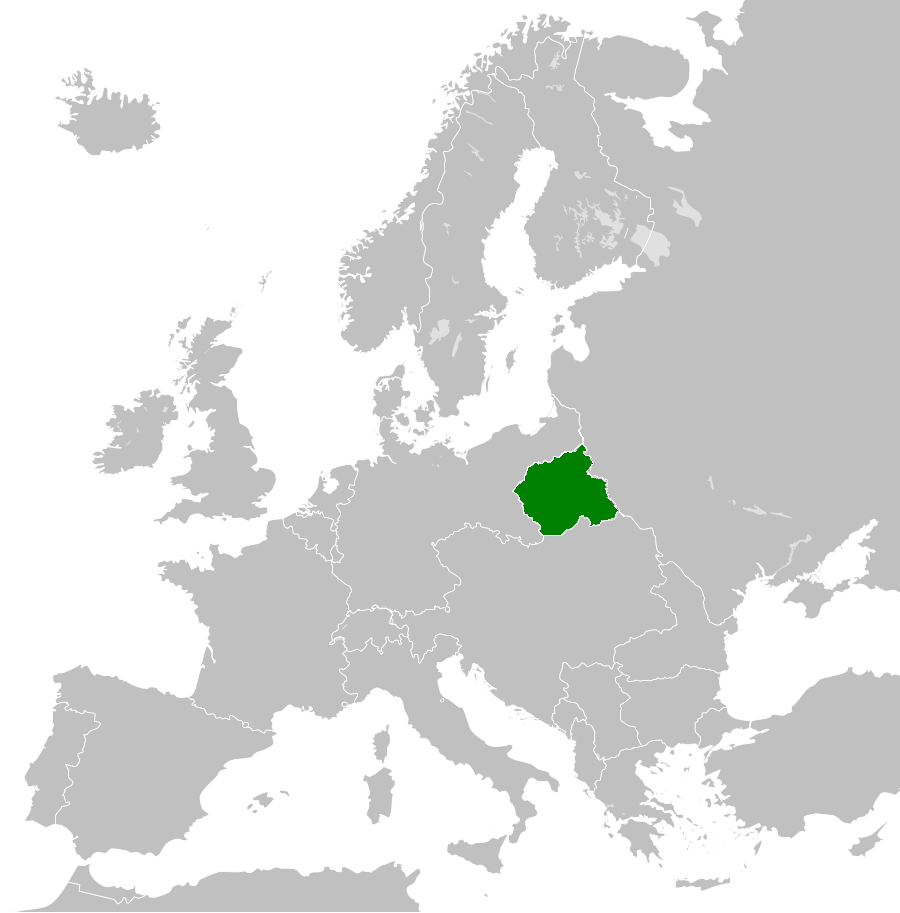
- Territory in 1918, with the rest of Europe (Map doesn't show occupied territories during World War 1)
- Status: Puppet state of the German Empire and Austria-Hungary, de facto subordinate to Government General of Warsaw and Military General Government of Lublin
- Capital: Warsaw
- Common languages: Polish; German
- Demonyms: Polish, Pole
- Government: Constitutional monarchy under a regency
- Head of State
  - 1917: State Council^{a}
  - 1917–1918: Regency Council^{a}
- Prime Minister
  - 1917–1918: Jan Kucharzewski
  - 1918: Antoni Ponikowski
  - 1918: Jan Kanty Steczkowski
  - 1918: Józef Świeżyński
  - 1918: Władysław Wróblewski
- Historical era: World War I
  - Proclamation: 5 November 1916
  - Established: 14 January 1917
  - Treaty of Brest-Litovsk: 3 March 1918
  - Armistice: 11 November 1918
- Currency: Polish marka; Imperial ruble; Austro-Hungarian krone
Preceded by
Government General of Warsaw
Military Government of Lublin
Supreme National Committee
Succeeded by
Second Polish Republic
- 1. Ruled as collective heads of state.

The Kingdom of Poland (Polish: Królestwo Polskie, German: Königreich Polen), also known informally as the Regency Kingdom of Poland (Polish: Królestwo Regencyjne), was a short-lived puppet state of the German Empire and polity that was proclaimed during World War I by it and Austria-Hungary on 5 November 1916 on the territories of formerly Russian-ruled Congress Poland held by the Central Powers as the Government General of Warsaw and which became active on 14 January 1917. It was subsequently transformed between 7 October 1918 and 22 November 1918 into the independent Second Polish Republic, the customary ceremonial founding date of the latter being set at 11 November 1918.

In spite of the initial total dependence of this client state on its sponsors, it ultimately served against their intentions in the aftermath of the Armistice of 11 November 1918 as the cornerstone proto-state of the nascent Second Polish Republic, the latter composed also of territories never intended by the Central Powers to be ceded to Poland, and therefore played a crucial role in the resurrection of Polish statehood.

== Rationale ==
The decision to propose the restoration of Poland after a century of partitions was taken up by the German policymakers in an attempt to legitimize further imperial presence in the occupied territories and create a buffer state to prevent future wars with Russia. The plan was followed by the German propaganda pamphlet campaign delivered to the Poles in 1915, claiming that the German soldiers were arriving as liberators to free Poland from subjugation by the Russian Empire. However, the German High Command under Erich Ludendorff also wanted to annex around 30,000 square kilometers of the territory of former Congress Poland, and planned to evict up to 3 million Poles and Jews to make room for German colonists in the so-called Polish Border Strip plan. The German government used punitive threats to force Polish landowners living in the German-occupied Baltic states to relocate and sell their Baltic property to the Germans in exchange for entry to Poland. Parallel efforts were made to remove Poles from the Polish territories of the Prussian Partition.

== Planning ==
=== Germany ===
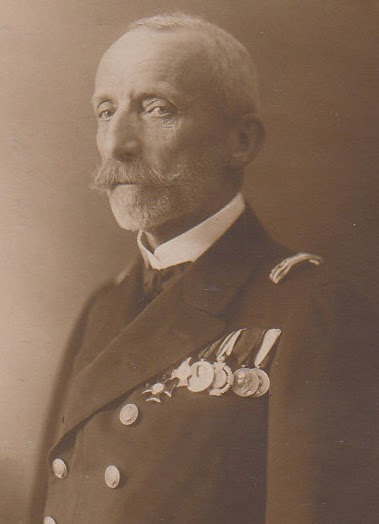
Archduke Charles Stephen (Karl Stephan) in 1917

With the onset of the war in 1914, for the purposes of securing Germany's eastern border against the Russian imperial army, Theobald von Bethmann Hollweg, the German chancellor, decided on the annexation of a specific strip of land from Congress Poland, known later on as the Polish Border Strip. In order to avoid adding the Polish population to the population of imperial Germany, it was proposed that the Poles would be ethnically cleansed to a proposed new Polish state further east, while the strip would be resettled with Germans.

German Emperor Wilhelm II conceived of creating a dependent Polish state from territory conquered from Russia. This new autonomous Kingdom of Poland would be ruled by a German prince and have its military, transportation, and economy controlled by Germany. Its army and railway network would be placed under Prussian command.

In several memoranda sent during 1915 and 1916, Hans Hartwig von Beseler, the Governor-General of the Polish areas under German control, proposed the establishment of an independent Polish state. Under the influence of General Erich Ludendorff, then in effect the director of Germany's eastern European operations, this proposal included the annexation of considerable amounts of land by Germany, Lithuania, and Austria-Hungary. Gerhard von Mutius, the cousin of Chancellor Bethmann Hollweg and the foreign office's representative at Beseler's headquarters, disputed the use of annexation, insisting that "if the military interests allow for it, divisions and secessions should be avoided", as such a policy would secure an "anti-Russian inclination toward the new Poland".

Similar plans were advanced by influential German intellectuals in the early years of the war. Among them were Hans Delbrück, Friedrich Naumann, and Paul Rohrbach. They generally argued that because Polish nationalism and Polish society were so highly developed, Germany would encounter severe resistance if it attempted to annex large territories in Poland. They concluded that Germany could only effectively project power into Poland by establishing an autonomous Polish state as a German protectorate.

The borders of this "autonomous" Poland were to be changed in favour of Germany with the annexation of the so-called "Polish Border Strip", which would lead to the annexation of considerable parts of Polish territory that had been part of the Russian partition of Poland. By the end of 1916, Germany wanted to annex almost 30,000 square kilometres of Polish territory. These lands were to be settled by ethnic Germans, while the Polish and Jewish population was to be removed.

After the expected victory the Polish economy was to be dominated by Germany and preparations were made for German control over the Polish railway system, shipping in the Vistula and industrial areas in Dąbrowa basin, Radom and Kielce.

Such plans were also proposed by members of the German minority in Poland in the Łódź area, who protested the Act of 5th November, and in a letter to the German government demanded the annexation of western Poland by Germany and settlement of ethnic Germans in those areas.

German candidates for the throne were disputed between the royal houses of Saxony, Württemberg and Bavaria. Bavaria demanded that their Prince Leopold, the Supreme Commander of the German forces on the Eastern front, become the new monarch. An alternative candidate was the then King of Bavaria himself, Ludwig III. The Württemberg candidate Duke Albrecht was considered suitable for the throne because he belonged to the Catholic line of the house. The claim of the Saxon House of Wettin's candidate Friedrich Christian, was based on three previous Saxon rulers - Electors Augustus the Strong and Frederick Augustus II and King Frederick Augustus I of Saxony - having ruled over Poland before. Another candidate was Prince Joachim of Prussia, the sixth child and youngest son of Kaiser Wilhelm II. Candidates from smaller German houses were proposed; Hans Heinrich XV von Hochberg, Prince of Pless, and Prince Kiril of Bulgaria, the second son of Tsar Ferdinand I.

=== Austria-Hungary ===
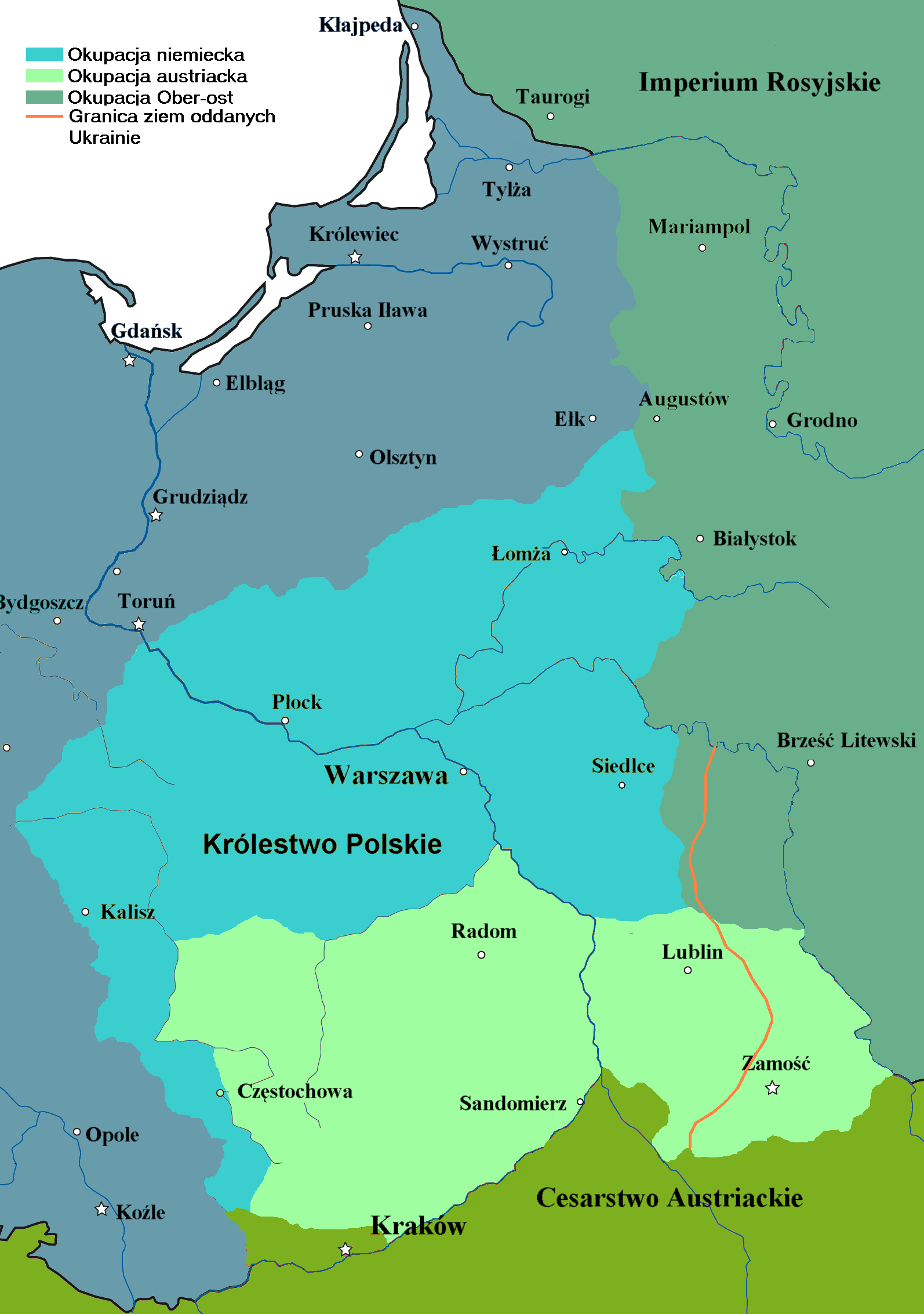
Occupation of the Kingdom of Poland during World War I: German Empire Occupied (from Russia) by Germany Austria-Hungary Occupied (from Russia) by Austria-Hungary Russian Empire

Austria-Hungary allowed the formation of a Polish quasi-government, the Supreme National Committee, and had three different ideas regarding Poland. One, the "Austro-Polish Solution", involved the creation of a Polish kingdom under the Emperor of Austria, who, among his other titles, was already King of Galicia and Lodomeria. German and Magyar (Hungarian) elements within the Habsburg monarchy opposed such a move for fear of creating a predominantly Slavic area. In contrast to Emperor Francis Joseph, Charles I of Austria, who had acceded to the Habsburg thrones in 1916, promoted the idea. Charles was supported by Archduke Wilhelm of Austria, who also backed another Austro-Slavist idea, that of creating an autonomous Grand Duchy of Ukraine within the Habsburg monarchy to counter the German project of Mitteleuropa. The other two ideas involved the division of former Congress Poland between Germany and Austria-Hungary, or between Austria-Hungary and a state built from Lithuania, Belarus and the remnants of Congress Poland to create a new version of the dissolved Polish–Lithuanian Commonwealth.

According to Polish historian Janusz Pajewski, "the Austrians had underestimated Germany's desire to determine Poland's fate". They did recognise, according to Prime Minister Karl von Stürgkh, that "Poles will remain Poles [...] even 150 years after Galicia was joined to Austria, Poles still didn't become Austrians".

Of the candidates for the new Polish throne, Archduke Charles Stephen of Austria (Polish: Karol Stefan) and his son Charles Albert were early contenders. Both resided in the Galician town of Saybusch (now Żywiec) and spoke Polish fluently. Charles Stephen's daughters were married to the Polish aristocrats Princes Olgierd of Czartoryski and Hieronim Mikołaj Radziwill.Candidates also came from the Polish aristocracy, namely Zdzisław Lubomirski, member of the Regency Council, Janusz Franciszek Radziwiłł, and even Josef Pilsudski himself.

By early 1916, the "Austro-Polish Solution" had become hypothetical. Erich von Falkenhayn, the German Chief of the General Staff, had rejected it in January, followed by Bethmann Hollweg in February. Bethmann Hollweg had been willing to see an Austrian candidate on the new Polish throne, so long as Germany retained control over the Polish economy, resources and army.

During the first year of the war, German and Austrian troops quickly conquered Russian Vistula Land, former Congress Poland, and in 1915 divided its administration between a German Governor General in Warsaw and an Austrian counterpart in Lublin. During the German military campaign in the ethnically Polish territory, Poles were subjected to forced labour and confiscation of food and private property.

== Preparations for Polish statehood ==
=== Proclamation of two Emperors promising a Polish state ===
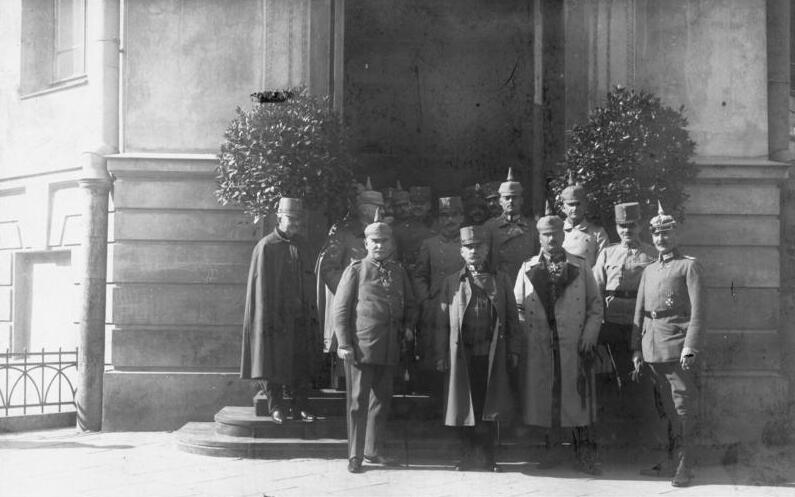
Governors-General Beseler (first from left) and Kuk (second from left) in 1916

After the German offensive failed in the Battle of Verdun and Austria suffered military setbacks against Italy, Generals Hindenburg and Ludendorff, now supreme commanders of the German military and increasingly the dominant force over the politics of both Germany and Austria, changed their positions on Poland: having previously considered Poland as a bargaining card in the event of a separate peace with Russia, they now postulated the establishment of a German dependency, hoping that the creation of a Polish army could replace the Central Powers' losses. In October 1916, at joint deliberations at Pszczyna, the German and Austrian leadership agreed to accelerate the proclamation promising the creation of a Polish state in the future. Although early plans called for an Austro-Polish solution, they were abandoned by the German Chancellor in February 1916 in the face of growing dependence of Austria-Hungary on Germany. Both control over the Polish economy and raw resources were to be in Germany's hands and Germany would also be in total control over the Polish army.

In the meantime, General Beseler had managed to gain support among pro-Austrian Poles and the followers of Józef Piłsudski. The Narodowa Demokracja party (centred in Paris), however, rejected any cooperation with the Central Powers. After the German Emperor and Chancellor met with a Polish delegation led by Józef Brudziński, the final details were arranged. On 5 November 1916, Governor Beseler at Warsaw issued an Act of 5th November, in which he promised that a Polish state would be created, without specifying any future Polish ruler, Polish borders or system of governance and, for the first time since 1831, had the Warsaw Royal Castle decorated with Polish flags. The Austrian Governor-General Kuk issued a similar proclamation at Lublin. A pro-German faction led by Władysław Studnicki existed but didn't gain any significant backing among the Polish population.

=== Occupation authorities ===
Immediately after the proclamation, the German governor-general in Warsaw issued an advertisement for military recruitment, resulting in Polish protests which especially decried the absence of a Polish government. In December 1916, a brigade of Polish legions under Stanisław Szeptycki moved into Warsaw to form the officer corps of the new Polish army.

The occupation authorities included German Governor-General at Warsaw, commander-in-chief of the Polska Siła Zbrojna Hans Hartwig von Beseler, as well as the Austro-Hungarian Governors-General at Lublin, including Major General Erich Freiherr von Diller, Feldzeugmeister Karl Kuk as well as Major General Stanislaus Graf Szeptycki and the Infantry General Anton Lipošćak.

=== Polish authorities ===
==== Council of State and Supreme National Committee ====
On 14 January 1917, a Provisional Council of State (Polish: Tymczasowa Rada Stanu) was established as a provisional government, consisting of 15 members chosen by the German and ten by the Austrian authorities. The magnate Waclaw Niemojowski was appointed Crown Marshal, with Józef Mikułowski-Pomorski acting as his deputy. Franciszek Pius Radziwiłł and Józef Piłsudski were put in charge of the Military Commission. The Council's first proclamation espoused monarchical government, Poland's expansion towards the east and supported an army of volunteers. A National Council served as a provisional parliament. The Councillors insisted on actual Polish autonomy and, on 21 April, were given authority over education, law courts, and propaganda. Still, students were dissatisfied with the extent of autonomy and organised a strike on 3 May, resulting in the temporary closing of all universities.

The state authorities within the Provisional Council of State included Crown Marshal Waclaw Niemojowski and Deputy Marshal Józef Mikułowski-Pomorski.

Meanwhile, the Supreme National Committee continued since 1914 as the limited Polish authority in the Kingdom of Galicia and Lodomeria.

==== "Regency" constitution ====
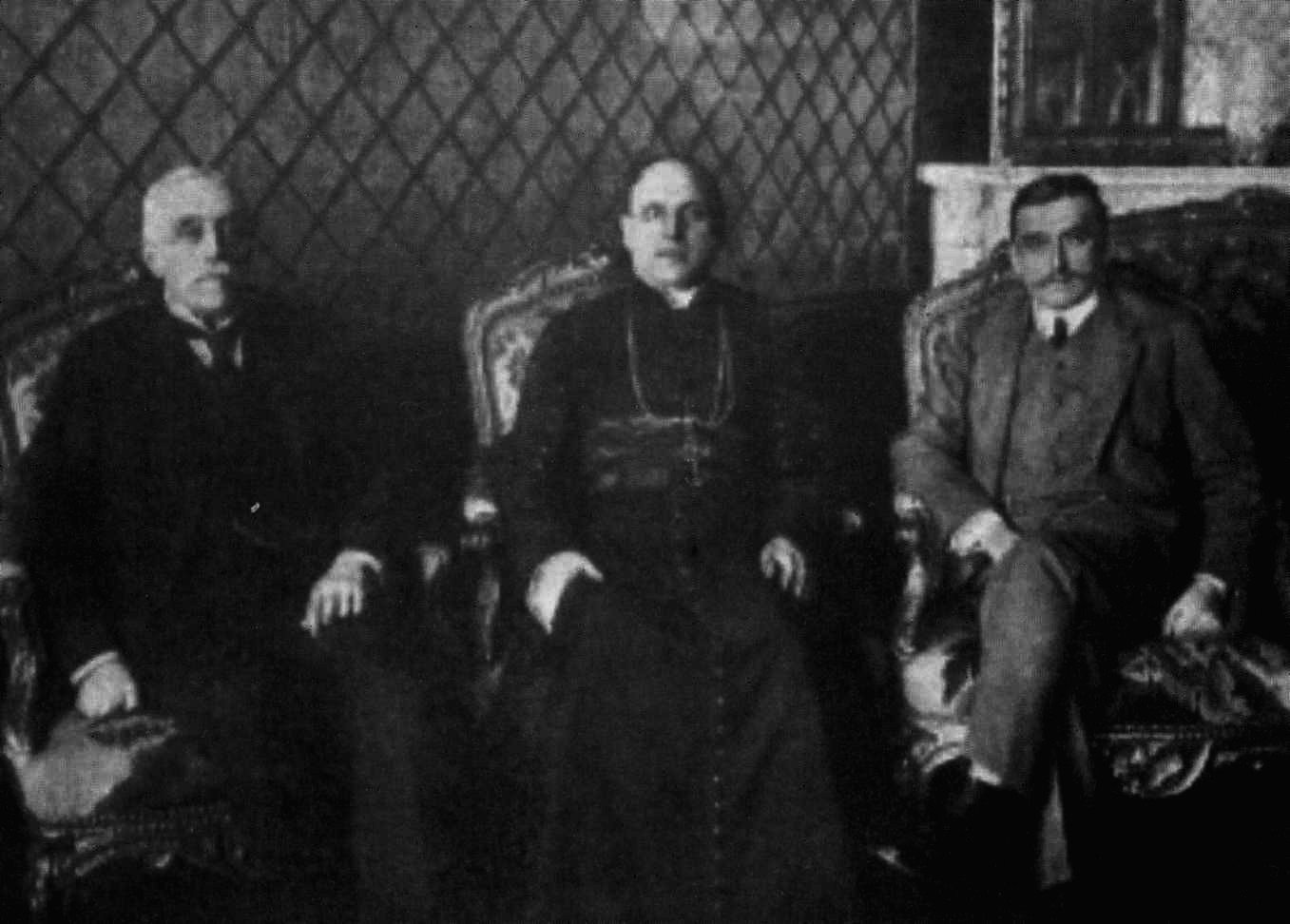
The Regency Council. Left to right: Ostrowski, Kakowski, and Lubomirski

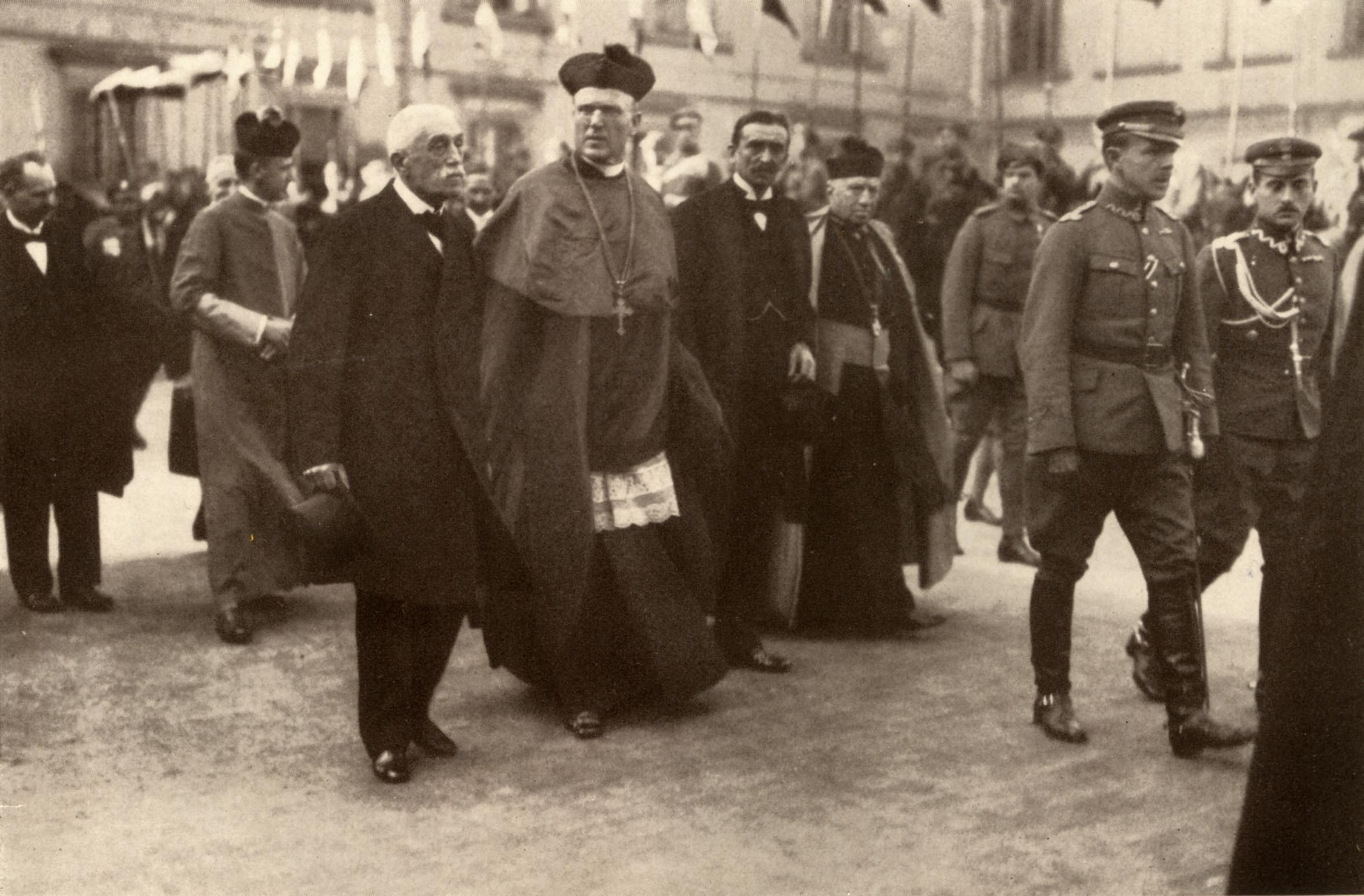
Members of the Regency Council with officers of the Polish Army

Both abovementioned bodies were dissolved after the creation of the Regency Council, consisting of Archbishop Aleksander Kakowski, Prince Zdzisław Lubomirski, and Józef Ostrowski. A draft constitution was proposed in 1917. After the intermission of the Temporary Committee of the Provisional Council of State (Polish: Komisja Przejściowa Tymczasowej Rady Stanu), the Central Powers introduced a provisional constitution, the patent, on 12 September 1917. The patent devised a constitutional monarchy with a bicameral parliament but without ministerial responsibility. Only schools and courts were transferred to Polish authorities, but after Polish protests, the German minority was given a separate school system. Pending the election of a King of Poland, a Regency Council (Polish: Rada Regencyjna) was installed as a provisional government. On 18 September, the following members of the Council were named: Aleksander Kakowski, Archbishop of Warsaw; aristocrat Prince Zdzisław Lubomirski who had served as mayor of Warsaw in 1916–1917 and Józef Ostrowski, a landowner and formerly the leading Polish politician in the Russian Duma.

The Regency Council was ceremonially installed on 15 October, the anniversary of Tadeusz Kościuszko's death, and on 26 November, appointed Jan Kucharzewski, a lawyer who had been working in the government since June, as Prime Minister. Administration, however, strictly remained in the hands of German authorities, now headed by Otto von Steinmeister. In March 1918, a resolution of the German Reichstag called for the establishment of a native civil administration in Poland, Kurland and Lithuania. However, the German authorities refused to transfer administration to Polish authorities and merely considered Poles as candidates to be trained under German supervision.

In August 1918, Achille Ratti arrived in Warsaw as an apostolic visitor to adjust the Catholic Church to the altered political circumstances. This appointment was mainly due to the influence of German Chancellor Georg von Hertling and Eugenio Pacelli, the Apostolic Nuncio to Bavaria. Ratti gained fame in 1920 for being the only diplomat to stay in Warsaw during the Polish–Soviet War and was elected as Pope Pius XI in 1922.

=== Armed forces and oath crisis ===
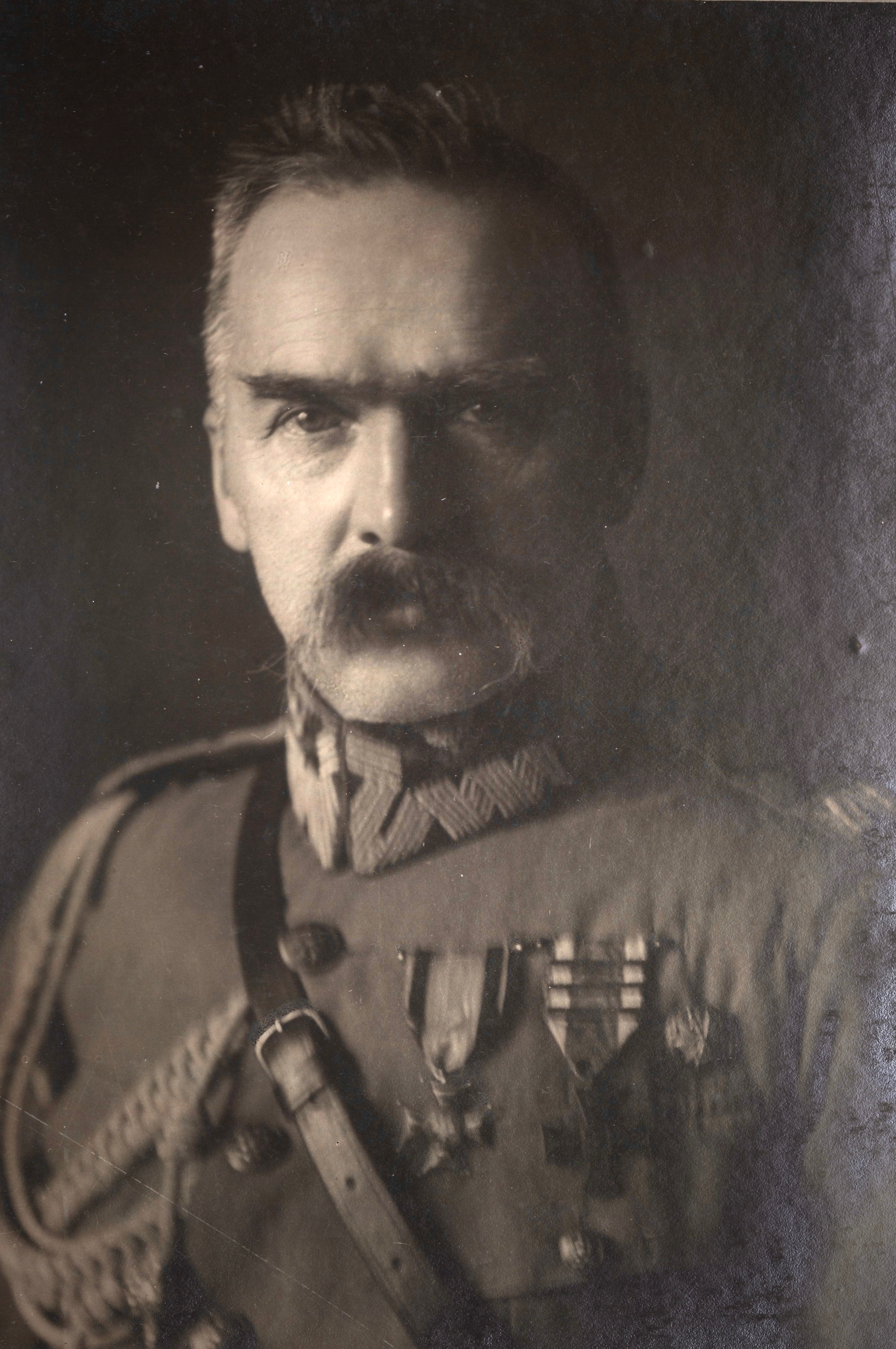
Józef Piłsudski

Meanwhile, U.S. President Woodrow Wilson's proclamation in favor of a unified and independent Poland and the downfall of the Emperor of Russia strengthened the Polish forces favoring a neutral or pro-Entente stance.

On 21 April, the Council of State had passed a proclamation in favor of the Polish army (German: Polnische Wehrmacht) and appointed Colonel Sikorski to oversee recruitment. The relationship between the Central Powers and the Polish legions became increasingly difficult, especially after the powers barred Austrian subjects from the Legions (now called the Polish auxiliary corps, Polski Korpus Posilkowy), aiming to divert them into the regular Austrian army. Piłsudski agreed to serve in the government and acted as minister of war. Piłsudski had abstained from the vote on the Polish army's oath, and on 2 July, resigned together with two left-wing State Councillors. The new army's oath drafted by the governors-general and passed by the Council of State resulted in a political crisis, especially since it was directed to an unspecified "future king" and emphasized the alliance with Germany and Austria. Several legionaries refused to take the oath and were arrested, prompting General Beseler to arrest Piłsudski, his associate Kazimierz Sosnkowski, and have them confined in Germany. In August, the remains of the Legions, roughly ten thousand soldiers, were transferred to the Eastern front. Crown Marshall Niemojowski resigned on 6 August and the Council disbanded on 25 August. After the oath crisis of 1917, recruitment to the Polish army had received scant support and achieved negligible results, reaching merely 5,000 men. In May 1918, the army was strengthened by General Józef Dowbór-Muśnicki, moving his Polish corps, assembled from the former Tsarist army, to Poland. In August, the legionaries arrested for refusing the oath were released and some again volunteered for the Polish army.

=== Borders of the nascent state ===
In their proclamation on 5 November 1916, the Central Powers reserved the right to determine the borders of the future Polish state, leaving open the possibility of German annexation of parts of Congress Poland.

==== West and North ====
Late in 1917, the German supreme command had proposed annexing a "border strip" to Germany, a policy earlier suggested by a letter to the German government by members of Poland's German minority, settled around Łódź. Such plans were agreed to in principle by the German government in March 1918 and in April gained support in the Prussian House of Lords, but were strongly opposed by General Beseler in a report to Emperor Wilhelm.

In July, Ludendorff specified his plans in a memorandum, proposing annexing a greatly enlarged "border strip" of 20,000 square kilometers. In August, Emperor Charles of Austria insisted on the Austro-Polish option, forbidding Archduke Charles Stephen from accepting the crown and declaring his opposition to any German plans for annexation, but General Ludendorff reaffirmed the "border strip" plan, while Poles refused to yield any part of the former Kingdom of Poland.

==== East and South ====
Ludendorff agreed in turn to leave Wilno (and possibly Minsk) to Poland, but this did little to soothe Polish sentiment, which regarded the return of Wilno as self-evident. Moreover, Germany's policy later shifted in favour of creating several smaller client states east of Poland, supported especially by the supreme command under Ludendorff, further heightening resistance to German presence on Polish territories. With the support of the German military, the Council of Lithuania proclaimed an independent Lithuanian state on 11 December. Polish sentiment reacted strongly, as it considered Poland and Lithuania to be a historical union and especially since it regarded Wilno (Vilnius), the proposed new Lithuanian capital, as a Polish city. Meanwhile, as it was becoming clear to Austrian politicians that the creation of a Polish state along the lines intended by Germany would result in the loss of the Kingdom of Galicia and Lodomeria, they similarly proposed to award only its western part to Poland, while East Galicia and the whole of Volhynia were to be separated in order to create a Ukrainian client state. The German representative Max Hoffmann expressed a belief that "independent Poland was always considered by me to be a utopia, and I have no doubts regarding my support for Ukrainian claims." This approach resulted in the signing on 9 February of the initially secret First Treaty of Brest-Litovsk between the Central Powers and the new state of Ukraine, which ceded to the latter the province of Chełm separated from Congress Poland by Russia in 1913. When it became public, many in Poland regarded this as a "Fourth partition of Poland", prompting a "political general strike" in Warsaw on 14 February and the resignation of the Jan Kucharzewski administration later that month. Parts of the Polish auxiliary corps under Józef Haller protested by breaking through the Austro-Russian front line to Ukraine, where they united with Polish detachments which had left the Tsarist army. After a fierce battle with the German army at Kaniów in May, the remnants were interned, though Haller managed to escape to Moscow.

The Regency Council sought admission to the negotiation regarding the Treaty of Brest-Litovsk with the Bolshevik government during travels to Berlin and Vienna in early 1918 but only gained German Chancellor Georg von Hertling's promise to admit the Polish government in an advisory capacity. This, however, was refused by the Bolshevik representatives, who denied the Polish government any legitimacy.

== Loss of control by Central Powers and transition to republic ==
After Germany's 1918 Spring Offensive had failed to win the war on the Western front, General Ludendorff in September proposed seeking peace based on the plan outlined by U.S. President Wilson in January 1918 in his Fourteen Points, which in regard to Poland demanded the creation of an "independent Polish state ... guaranteed by international covenant" with "free and secure access to the sea". On 3 October, the new German Chancellor, Prince Max of Baden, announced Germany's acceptance of Wilson's plan and immediate disestablishment of military administration in the countries occupied by Germany. Three days later, the Regency Council in Warsaw also adopted Wilson's proposals as the basis for creating a Polish state. On 1 October, General Beseler had conferred with Hindenburg at Berlin and, informed of the gloomy military situation, had returned to Warsaw ill and dispirited. On 6 October, he handed over the administration to Polish civil servants. The Regency Council declared independence on 7 October 1918. On 23 October, the Regency Council installed the Świeżyński government, whom Beseler transferred the command over Polish forces (which by then included the Polish regiments of the Austro-Hungarian Army) to. On 4 November, the government was dismissed after an attempted coup d’état to depose the Regency Council, and was replaced by the provisional government of Władysław Wróblewski.

However, another Polish government based in Lublin arose to challenge the Regency's authority: on 6 November, Ignacy Daszyński proclaimed the "Polish People's Republic" (Tymczasowy Rząd Ludowy Republiki Polskiej - literally: "Temporary People's Government of the Polish Republic"), with Daszyński himself (a Socialist politician and formerly a member of the Austrian parliament) as Prime Minister and Colonel Edward Rydz-Śmigły as a military commander. Moderates in Warsaw, who now hoped for a return of General Piłsudski, who was still held in custody at Magdeburg, repudiated Lublin's declaration of the deposition of the Regency to be deposed and its plans for radical social reforms. Already in October, the Regency Council had requested Piłsudski's release, and after negotiations through Harry Graf Kessler, the General was allowed to return to Warsaw, where he arrived on 10 November. The following day, Germany signed the armistice and German troops in Warsaw were disarmed as they refused to fire on Polish insurgents. On the same day, the Daszyński government ceded all authority to Piłsudski and resigned, while the Regency Council transferred to him its military authority. On 14 November, the Council ceded the remainder of its authority to Józef Piłsudski and voted itself out of existence. On the same day, Piłsudski had issued in turn a decree reappointing the [Daszyński] Government, in spite of the continued existence of the Wróblewski provisional government. On 16 November 1918, Piłsudski sent a radio telegram to "Mr President of the United States, the Royal English Government, the Government of the French Republic, the Royal Italian Government, the Imperial Japanese Government, the Government of the German Republic, as well as the governments of all the warring or neutral states", notifying them about the establishment of an independent Polish State, named in the telegram as the Polish Republic.

On 17 November, both the newly designated prime minister, Daszyński and the provisional government of Wróblewski resigned in favour of the new Moraczewski government, finally ending the governmental diarchy. The transition to republican government was formally completed through the decree of 22 November 1918 on the supreme representational authority of the Polish Republic, which stipulated the assumption by Piłsudski of the interim office of chief of state.

== See also ==
- History of Poland (1795–1918)
- Diplomatic history of World War I
- Poland A and B

== Bibliography ==
- (in Polish) Immanuel Geiss, Tzw., Polski Pas Graniczny 1914-1918, Warszawa, 1964.
- (in Polish) Janusz Pajewski, Pierwsza Wojna Światowa 1914-1918, Wydawnictwa PWN, 2005.
- (in Polish) Piotr Eberhardt, "Projekty aneksyjne Cesarstwa Niemieckiego wobec ziem polskich podczas I wojny światowej i Problematyka geopolityczna ziem polskich", Warszawa: PAN IGiPZ, 2008.
- Hajo Holborn, A History of Modern Germany: 1840-1945, Princeton University Press, 1982.
- Hein Eirch Goemans, War and punishment: the causes of war termination and the First World War, Princeton University Press, 2000.
- (in Polish) Pro memoria. Prusak w Polsce, by Józef Rapacki, Wydawnictwo Tygodnika Ilustrowanego, Warszawa.
