= Government General of Warsaw =

1915–1918 German administrative division

General Governorate of Warsaw Generalgouvernement Warschau (German) Generalne Gubernatorstwo Warszawskie (Polish)
- 1915–1918
- Seal

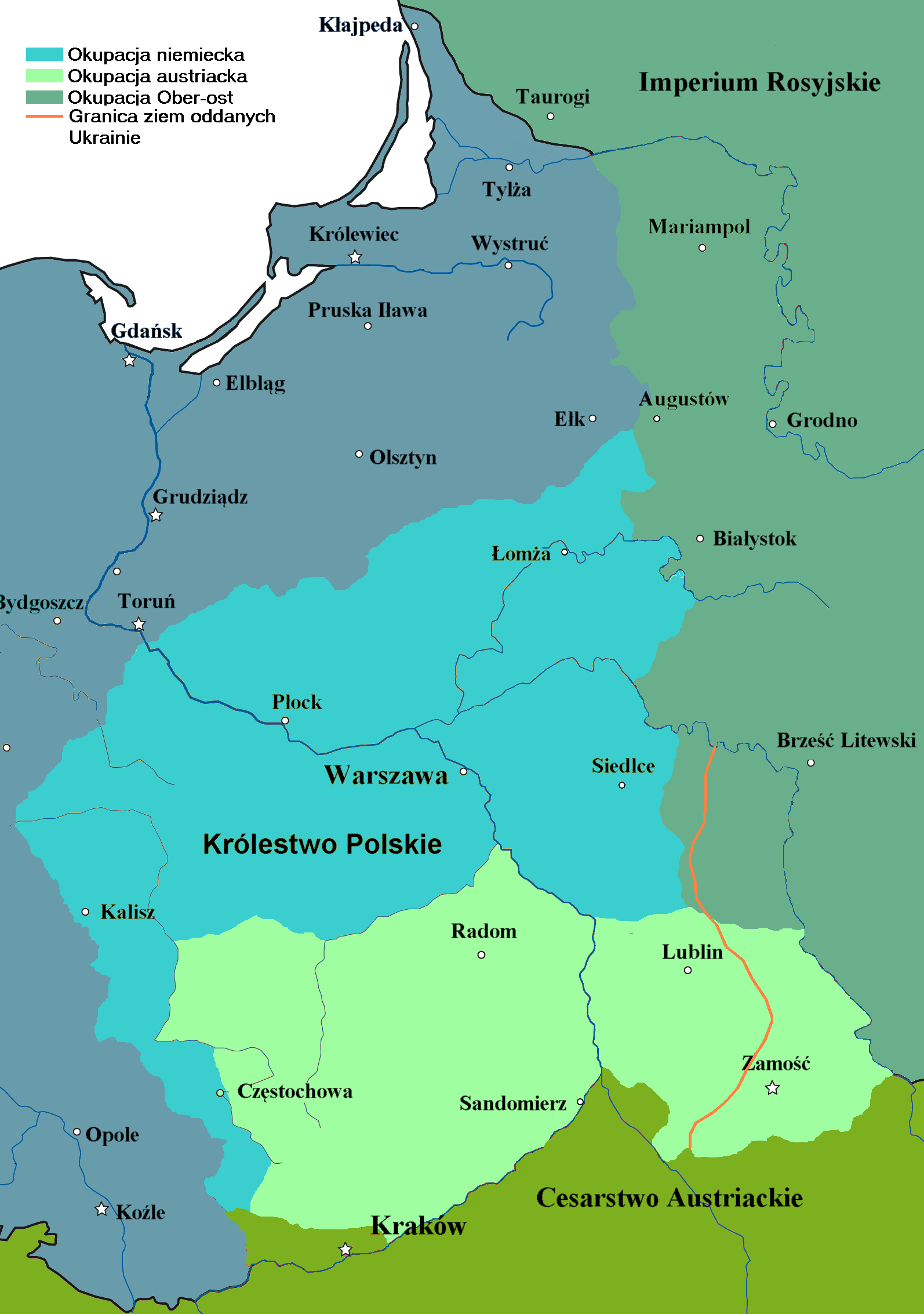
- The Government General of Warsaw, depicted in light blue
- Status: Occupation authority
- Capital: Warsaw
- Common languages: German, Polish
- Governor-General
  - 1915–1918: Hans Hartwig von Beseler
- Chief of Joint Administration
  - 1915–1917: Wolfgang von Kries
  - 1917–1918: Otto von Steinmeister
- History
  - Established: 18 October 1915
  - Armistice, withdrawal of German forces: 11 November 1918
Preceded by	Succeeded by
Vistula Land; Ober Ost	Second Polish Republic
- Today part of: Poland

The General Government of Warsaw (German: Generalgouvernement Warschau) was an administrative civil district created by the German Empire in World War I. It encompassed the north-western half of the former Russian-ruled Congress Poland.

Although the territory initially formed a part of the Ober Ost military command under the authority of general Erich Ludendorff, after the military advances of the Central Powers in the fall offensive of 1915 the territory came under a separate administration in October. It continued to exist even after the later establishment of a rump Kingdom of Poland, a Central Powers puppet state. Its governor-general, Hans Hartwig von Beseler, held his office for the entire duration of the region's existence. The headquarters of the General Government operated in the Royal Castle, Warsaw, while the governor-general's seat was in the Belvedere palace, Warsaw.

To the south of the General Government lay an Austro-Hungarian-controlled counterpart called the Military Government of Lublin.

On 18 October 1916, a joint administration was introduced for both districts of the former Congress Poland, with a German civil servant, Wolfgang von Kries, appointed as the first chief of the intended administration. On 9 December, Kries founded a Polish central bank, which issued a new currency, the Polish marka (Marka polska).

During the occupation, German authorities drafted Poles into forced labor to replace German workers drafted into the army.

== Governors-General ==
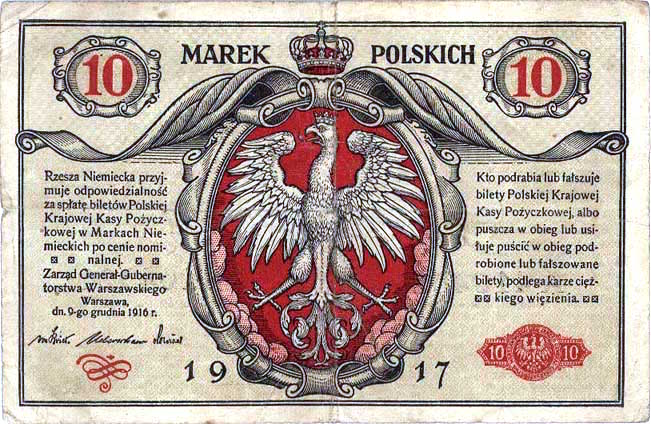
10 Polish marks, 1917

Portrait	Name (Birth–Death)	Term			Notes
Portrait	Name (Birth–Death)	Took office	Left office	Duration	Notes
General von Beseler	Hans Hartwig von Beseler (1850–1921)	26 August 1915	12 November 1918	2–3 years	Also the titular commander of the Polska Siła Zbrojna, or "Polnische Wehrmacht". With the Polish declaration of independence and Germany's surrender, Beseler escaped from Warsaw to Berlin disguised as a worker. Reviled in both Germany and Poland, he died in 1921.

Chiefs of Joint Administration:

- Wolfgang von Kries (18 October 1915 – 26 November 1917)
- Otto von Steinmeister (26 November 1917 – 6 October 1918)

== See also ==
- Ober Ost
- Kingdom of Poland (1917–1918)
- Polish Border Strip
- Eastern Front (WWI)
- General Governorate of Belgium

== Bibliography ==
- Pro memoria. Prusak w Polsce, by Józef Rapacki.
