= Hans Hartwig von Beseler =

German general

- Born: 27 April 1850; Greifswald, Kingdom of Prussia
- Died: 20 December 1921 (aged 71); Potsdam/Neu-Babelsberg, Weimar Republic
- Military career
- Allegiance: Prussia; North German Confederation; German Empire
- Branch: Prussian Army; Imperial German Army
- Service years: 1868–1918
- Rank: Generaloberst
- Commands: 3rd Reserve Corps
- Conflicts: Franco-Prussian War; World War I: Battle of the Yser; Siege of Novogeorgievsk
- Awards: Pour le Mérite with oak leaves

Hans Hartwig von Beseler (27 April 1850 – 20 December 1921) was a German colonel general.

== Biography ==
Beseler was born in Greifswald, Pomerania as the son of Georg Beseler, then a law professor at the University of Greifswald.

=== Military career ===
He entered the Prussian Army in 1868, fought in the Franco-Prussian War of 1870-1871 and had a successful military career until his retirement in 1910. Beseler was ennobled in 1904 by William II, German Emperor.

At the outbreak of World War I in 1914, Beseler was brought out of retirement and given command of the 3rd Reserve Corps in the German First Army led by Generaloberst Alexander von Kluck. The Imperial German Army took Brussels on 20 August and the German command considered the Belgian Army defeated. The main force of the German armies marched toward France, leaving the 3rd Reserve Corps behind. Beseler was ordered to take possession of the city of Antwerp on 9 September. The Siege of Antwerp ended on 10 October, when Antwerp's Mayor Jan De Vos, surrendered the city. Beseler followed the Belgian army and was halted by Allied (mainly Belgian) forces in the Battle of the Yser (October 1914).

In the spring of 1915, Beseler was sent to the Eastern Front with Max von Gallwitz's 9th Army. There he led the successful siege of Novogeorgievsk in August 1915.

=== Administrative career ===
On 27 August 1915 Beseler was made Military Governor of the German-occupied part of the zone of Polish lands, or Congress Poland, and served as such until the end of the war. Beseler hoped to assemble three divisions of Polish volunteers for use by the Central Powers, and to this end wanted to present a "facade of independent Poland". His official title was Governor-general of Generalgouvernement Warschau. Beseler gave his support to the Polish Border Strip plan, which would have seen mass expulsions of Poles and Jews from territory annexed by the German Empire from formerly Russian-held parts of Poland, and subsequent colonization of this area by German settlers.

In November 1915, Beseler reopened the University of Warsaw and the Warsaw Polytechnic Institute and allowed the usage of the Polish language at the university for the first time since 1869. Municipal councils were elected and the lower jurisdiction was organized by Polish locals. Despite these efforts, German intentions were transparent, and German rule was not well tolerated by the Poles. German calls for Polish volunteers produced disappointing results. Most Poles saw an Allied victory as the best hope for genuine independence.

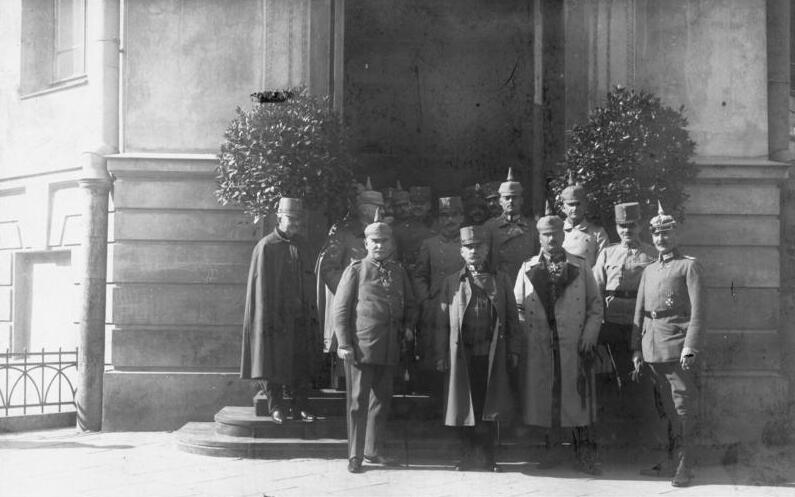
Beseler (1st left) and Karl Kuk (2nd left) in Lublin, 1916

After the Central Powers' Act of 5th November of 1916 held out the prospect of limited Polish autonomy, Beseler stayed and still wielded real power as the General Governor of the Government General of Warsaw, the German-occupied part of the Kingdom of Poland, alongside the Austrian Governor General Karl Kuk, who resided in Lublin. Beseler was also the titular commander of the so-called Polnische Wehrmacht. After the Act of 5 November was declared, he organized a ceremony in Warsaw's Royal Castle with such gestures as the unfurling of a Polish flag and the playing of the Polish national anthem; the event backfired as the Polish crowds started shouting "Out with the Germans!". On 4 October 1916 Beseler issued a decree allowing forced labour by Polish men aged between 18 and 45.

After Poland declared independence on 11 November 1918 and all German soldiers in Warsaw were disarmed, Beseler fled in disguise to Germany. A broken and disillusioned man, attacked by the German Conservatives and Nationalists as having been too liberal towards the Poles, but disliked in Poland for being too Prussian, Beseler died in 1921 in Neubabelsberg near Potsdam. He was buried at the Invalidenfriedhof in Berlin.

=== Ranks ===
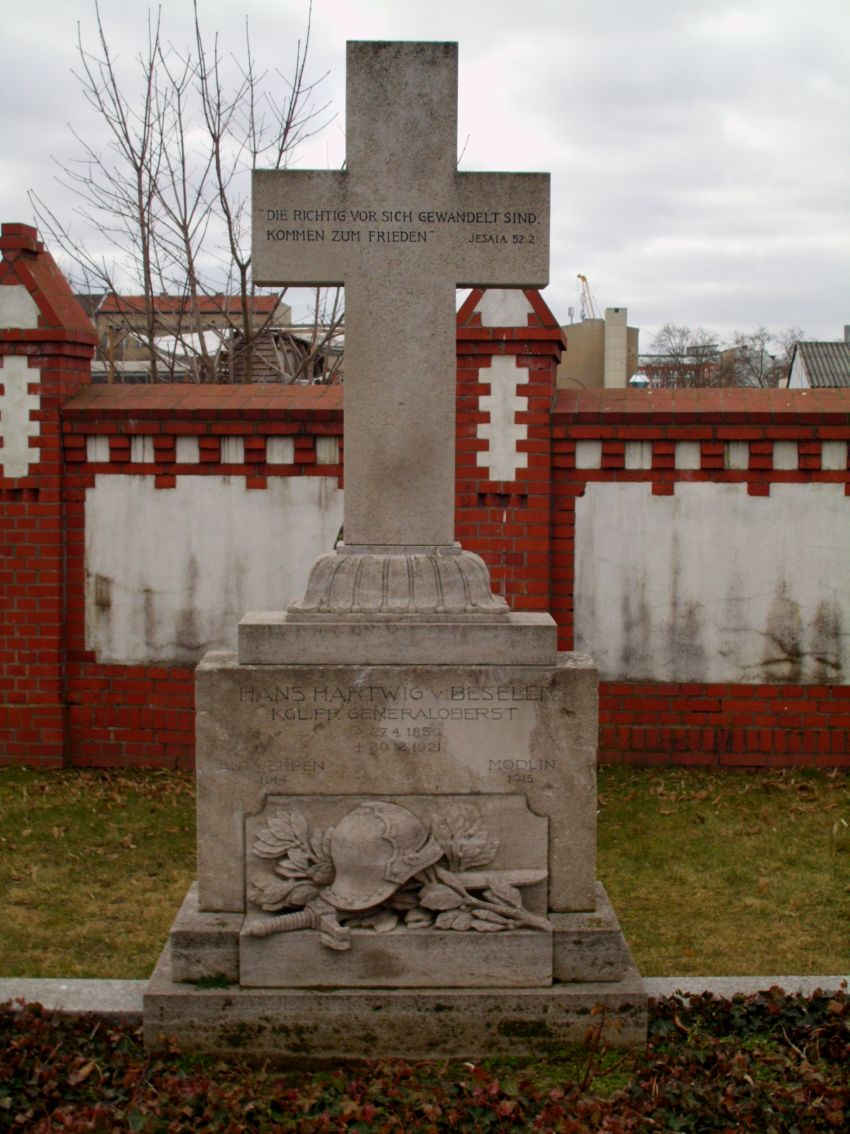
Grave of Hans Hartwig von Beseler on the Invalidenfriedhof Berlin

- 1870/71: Leutnant
- 1875-06-15: Oberleutnant
- 1882-04-18: Hauptmann
- 1888-09-19: Major
- 1893-10-17: Oberstleutnant
- 1897-03-22: Oberst
- 1900-01-27: Generalmajor
- 1903-04-18: Generalleutnant
- 1907-11-09: General der Infanterie
- 1918-01-27: Generaloberst

== Orders and decorations ==
German Honors:

- Iron Cross, 1st and 2nd Classes (Prussia)
- Pour le Mérite, 10 October 1914 (Prussia)
  - With Oak Leaves, 20 August 1915 (Prussia)
- Commander with Star and Crown of the Royal House Order of Hohenzollern (Prussia)

Foreign Honors:

- Knight 2nd Class of the Imperial Order of the Iron Crown (Austria-Hungary)
- Grand Cross of the Imperial Austrian Order of Franz Joseph (Austria-Hungary)
- Grand Cross with War Decoration of the Austrian Imperial Order of Leopold, 17 October 1914 (Austria-Hungary)
- Commander Grand Cross of the Royal Order of the Sword (Sweden)

== Bibliography ==
- Bogdan Graf von Hutten-Czapski, Sechzig Jahre Politik und Gesellschaft, Volunme 1 - 2, Berlin: Mittler 1936

Military offices
| Preceded by Franz Xaver von Oberhoffer | Quartermaster-General of the German Army; 17 October 1899 — 7 February 1902 | Succeeded by Karl von Bülow |
