= Jan Kanty Steczkowski =

Polish economist, solicitor and politician

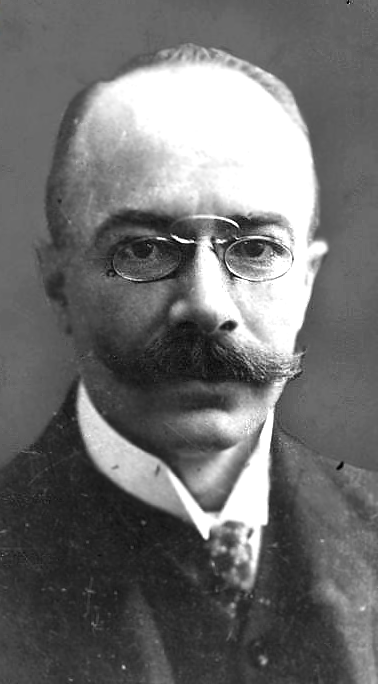

3rd Prime Minister the Regency Kingdom of Poland
- In office 4 April 1918 – 2 October 1918
- Monarch: Rada Regencyjna (Regency Council)
- Deputy: Stanisław Dzierzbicki; Bohdan Broniewski
- Preceded by: Antoni Ponikowski
- Succeeded by: Józef Świeżyński

Personal details
- Born: 16 October 1862 Dąbrowa Tarnowska
- Died: 3 September 1929 (aged 66) Kraków
- Political party: Stronnictwo Prawicy Narodowej

Jan Kanty Steczkowski (Polish pronunciation: [ˈjan ˈkantɨ stɛt͡ʂˈkɔfskʲi]; 16 October 1862, Dąbrowa Tarnowska – 3 September 1929, Kraków) was a Polish economist, solicitor and politician.

Steczkowski served as Minister of Finance of Poland in the government of Jan Kucharzewski. On 4 April 1918, the Regency Council set up a government in which he became the Prime Minister. His government only lasted until 23 October.

Steczkowski returned to politics in the government of Wincenty Witos (1920–1921), once again leading the Ministry of Finance. Later he was the director of the Bank Gospodarstwa Krajowego (replaced in 1927).
