= Polish Army oaths =

List of historical and modern Polish oaths

The following is a list of the Polish military oaths, both historical and contemporary.

== Contemporary ==
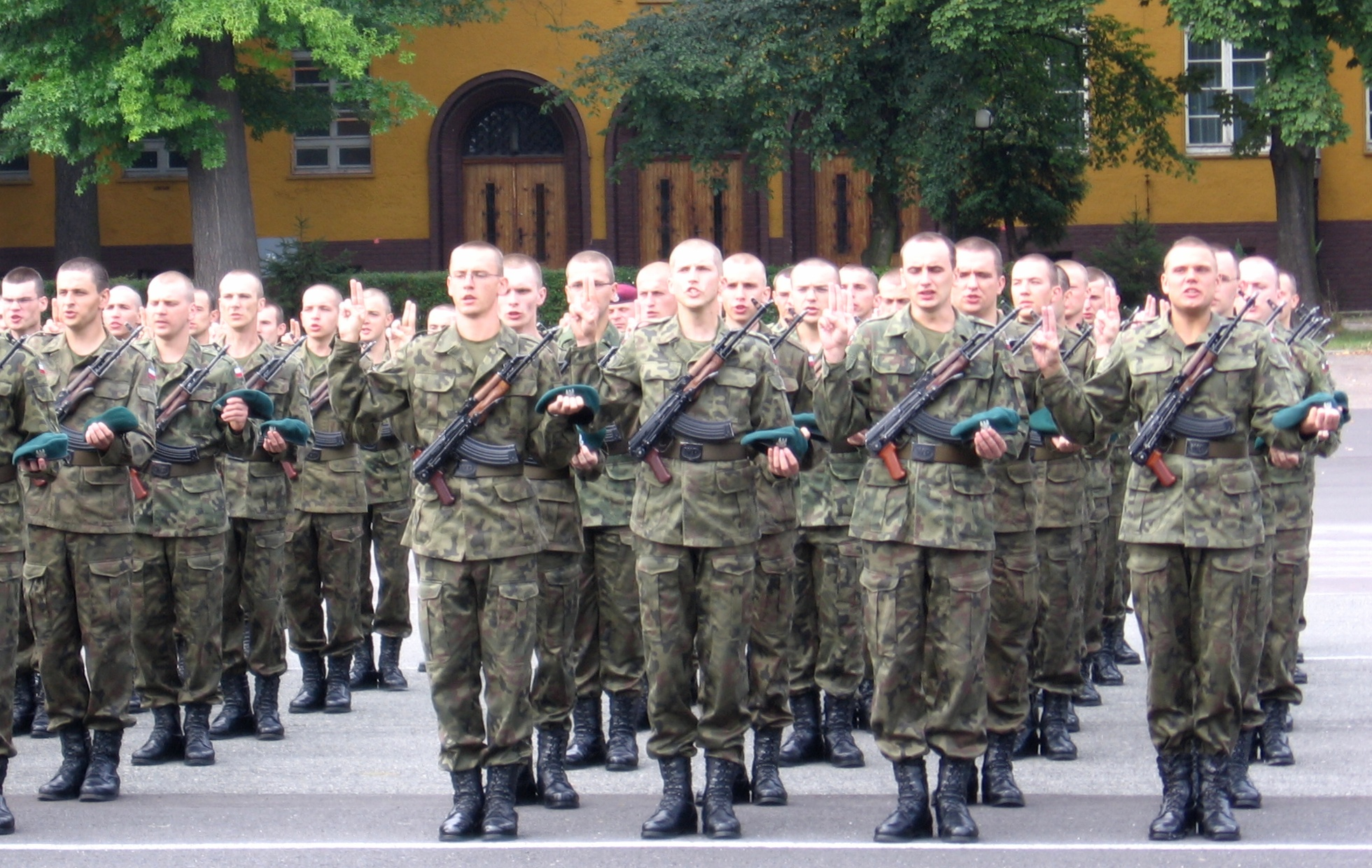

This oath is in current use in the Polish Armed Forces.

Polish	English (Not a professional translation)
Ja żołnierz Wojska Polskiego, Przysięgam, Służyć wiernie Rzeczypospolitej Polskiej, Bronić jej niepodległości i granic, Stać na straży Konstytucji, Strzec honoru żołnierza polskiego, Sztandaru wojskowego bronić, Za sprawę mojej Ojczyzny, W potrzebie krwi własnej ani życia nie szczędzić, Tak mi dopomóż Bóg!	I, as a soldier/sailor/airman of the Polish Armed Forces, Do Swear, To Serve loyally the Republic of Poland, To defend her independence and borders, To keep guard over the Constitution, To defend the honor of a Polish soldier, To defend the military banners and standards of the Armed Forces, For the sake of my Fatherland, Even at the cost of losing both my life and blood. So help me God!

== Historical ==
=== 1788 Oath ===
In 1788, the State Defence Commission of the Commonwealth of Poland and Lithuania issued this following military oath to all military personnel of the Commonwealth armed services. This is the oath spoken in Polish.

==== Polish text ====
Ja N.N. przysięgam Panu Bogu wszechmogącemu w Trójcy Świętej jedynemu, jako Najjaśniejszemu Stanisławowi Augustowi królowi polskiemu i Wielkiemu Księciu Litewskiemu, tudzież stanom skonfederowanym Rzeczypospolitej pod aktem siódmego października tysiąc siedemset osiemdziesiątego ósmego roku w Warszawie pod laskami Wgo Stanisława Małachowskiego koronnego i Wgo Kazimierza księcia Sapiechy Lit. marszałków konfederacyją związanym wiernym a Komisyi Wojskowej Obojga Narodów posłusznym będę: tak mi Boże dopomóż!

==== English Text ====
I N.N. swear to the Lord Almighty One in the Holy Trinity, to the Most Serene Stanisław Augustus, the King of Poland and the Grand Duke of Lithuania, and the Confederate States of the Commonwealth under the Act of the Seventh October One Thousand Seven Hundred and Eighty-Eight in Warsaw under the gowns of Honourable Stanisław Małachowski Crown Marshal, and Honourable Kazimierz, Prince Sapiecha, Lithuanian Marshal, both bounded by the Confederacy, that I will be loyal and to the Military Commission of the Both Nations obedient: so help me God!

=== Kościuszko's Uprising (1794) ===
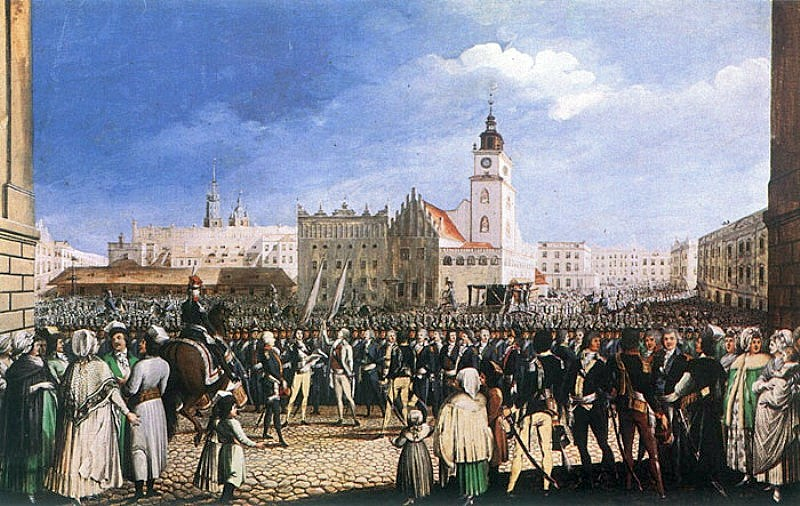
Kościuszko taking an oath at Kraków's Market Square, an 1804 gouache by Michał Stachowicz

The Oath of Tadeusz Kościuszko, sworn in the old town market of Kraków on 24 March 1794, at the outbreak of the Kościuszko Uprising.

==== Polish text ====
Ja, Tadeusz Kościuszko, przysięgam w obliczu Boga całemu Narodowi Polskiemu, iż powierzonej mi władzy na niczyj prywatny ucisk nie użyję, lecz jedynie jej dla obrony całości granic, odzyskania samowładności Narodu i ugruntowania powszechnej wolności używać będę. Tak mi Panie Boże dopomóż i niewinna męka Syna Jego.

==== English translation ====
I, Tadeusz Kościuszko, hereby swear in the face of God to the whole Polish Nation, that I shall not use the power entrusted to me for anyone's personal oppression, but only for the defence of the integrity of the borders, for retaking the sovereignty of the Nation, and for strengthening the universal freedom. So help me God and the innocent Passion of His Son!

=== Polish Legions in World War I ===
The oath was prepared by the German authorities and on July 3, 1917 presented to Gen. Hans Beseler, then the German governor of Warsaw and the highest authority of the planned Polnische Wehrmacht military formation. He invoked in swearing to the loyalty of the Polish Legions with it, thus putting them under direct German command.

However, the Polish Legions were already enraged with the German and Austro-Hungarian plans to place limits on Polish independence. In addition, they were angered by and also the Austro-Hungarian's dismissal of Józef Piłsudski, who was the Legions' leader. Therefore, most of the soldiers of the Legions declined to swear allegiance to a non-existent king of Poland or to a foreign government, which led to the so-called Oath Crisis.

==== Polish text ====
Przysięgam Panu Bogu Wszechmogącemu, że Ojczyźnie mojej, Polskiemu Królestwu, i memu przyszłemu Królowi na lądzie i wodzie i na każdym miejscu wiernie i uczciwie służyć będę; że w wojnie obecnej dotrzymam wiernie braterstwa broni wojskom Niemiec i Austro-Węgier oraz państw z nimi sprzymierzonych; że będę przełożonych swych i dowódców słuchał, dawane mi rozkazy i przepisy wykonywał i w ogóle tak się zachowywał, abym mógł żyć i umierać jako mężny prawy żołnierz polski. Tak mi, Boże, dopomóż!

==== English translation ====
I hereby swear to God Almighty, that I shall loyally serve my Fatherland, the Kingdom of Poland and my future King, both on water and on land, and in any circumstances; that during this war I shall remain a loyal brother in arms to the soldiers of Germany and Austria-Hungary and of the states allied to them; that I shall obey my superiors and commanders, fulfil the orders and generally behave so as to be able to live and die as a brave and just Polish soldier. So help me God!

=== The Polish Army in France (1918) ===
Oath written by General Józef Haller and the Polish National Committee in 1918. It was used by the units of the Blue Army, that is the Polish Army formed in France at the end of the First World War.

==== Polish text ====
Przysięgam przed Panem Bogiem Wszechmogącym, w Trójcy Świętej Jedynym, na wierność Ojczyźnie mojej, Polsce, jednej i niepodzielnej. Przysięgam, iż gotów jestem życie oddać za świętą sprawę jej zjednoczenia i wyzwolenia, bronić sztandaru mego do ostatniej kropli krwi, dochować karności i posłuszeństwa mojej zwierzchności wojskowej, a w całym postępowaniu moim strzec honoru żołnierza polskiego. Tak mi, Panie Boże, dopomóż.

==== English translation ====
I swear in the sight of God Almighty, who is One in the Holy Trinity, my faithful allegiance to my Fatherland, Poland, sole and indivisible. I swear that I am ready to give my life for the sacred cause of her unification and liberation, I swear to defend my banner to the last drop of my blood, to remain loyal and obedient to my commanders, and that by all my deeds I will guard the honour of the Polish soldier. So help me God!

=== Greater Poland Uprising (1919) ===
To avoid an open conflict with Germany, the forces fighting in the Greater Poland Uprising formally declared the existence of a separate state, and those forces were then considered separate from the Polish Army. Hence the oath of the armed forces of Greater Poland was different from that used by other Polish units elsewhere.

==== Polish text ====
W obliczu Boga Wszechmogącego w Trójcy Świętej Jedynego ślubuję, że Polsce, Ojczyźnie mojej i sprawie całego Narodu Polskiego zawsze i wszędzie służyć będę, że kraju Ojczystego i dobra narodowego do ostatniej kropli krwi bronić będę, że Komisarzowi Naczelnej Rady Ludowej w Poznaniu i dowódcom, i przełożonym swoim mianowanym przez tenże Komisariat, zawsze i wszędzie posłuszny będę, że w ogóle tak zachowywać się będę, jak przystoi na mężnego i prawego żołnierza-Polaka, że po zjednoczeniu Polski złożę przysięgę żołnierską, ustanowioną przez polską zwierzchność państwową.

==== English translation ====
In the sight of God Almighty, One in the Holy Trinity, I hereby swear my everlasting allegiance to Poland, my Fatherland and to the whole Polish Nation. I swear to defend the Fatherland and the national good to the last drop of my blood. I swear loyalty and obedience to the Commissioner of the Supreme National Council in Poznań and to my commanders, and to my superiors named by the Commission. I swear to always behave as a brave and valiant soldier and Pole, and that when Poland is united I shall take an oath accepted by the Polish military authority.

=== Second Polish Republic (1924) ===
During the interwar period, the unified Polish Army introduced three distinct oaths to accommodate the diverse religious beliefs of its soldiers. These oaths were established by the Basic Duties of a Soldier Act on July 18, 1924, and later reaffirmed by an order from the Ministry of Military Affairs on July 15, 1927.

==== Polish text ====
Christians
Przysięgam Panu Bogu Wszechmogącemu, w Trójcy Świętej Jedynemu być wiernym Ojczyźnie mej, Rzeczypospolitej Polskiej, Chorągwi wojskowych nigdy nie odstąpić. Stać na straży konstytucji i honoru żołnierza polskiego. Prawu i Prezydentowi Rzeczypospolitej Polskiej być uległym. Rozkazy dowódców i przełożonych wiernie wykonywać. Tajemnic wojskowych strzec. Za sprawę Ojczyzny mej walczyć do ostatniego tchu w piersiach. I w ogóle tak postępować, aby mógł żyć i umierać jak prawy żołnierz polski. Tak mi dopomóż Bóg i święta Syna jego męka. Amen.

Muslims
Przysięgam Panu Bogu Jedynemu być wiernym Ojczyźnie mej, Rzeczypospolitej Polskiej, chorągwi wojskowych nigdy nie odstąpić, stać na straży Konstytucji i honoru żołnierza polskiego, prawu i Prezydentowi Rzeczypospolitej Polskiej być uległym, rozkazy dowódców i przełożonych wiernie wykonywać, tajemnic wojskowych strzec, za sprawę Ojczyzny mej walczyć do ostatniego tchu w piersiach i w ogóle tak postępować, abym mógł żyć i umierać jak prawy żołnierz polski. Bereetjum Mine Allachivy Veresulini illeclezine a hetdeteum minel masiurkine BilWałłagi, Tałłagi, Amin.

Other denominations
Przysięgam Bogu Wszechmogącemu być wiernym Ojczyźnie mej, Rzeczypospolitej Polskiej, chorągwi wojskowych nigdy nie odstąpić, stać na Straży Konstytucji i honoru żołnierza polskiego, prawu i Prezydentowi Rzeczypospolitej Polskiej być uległym, rozkazy dowódców i przełożonych wiernie wykonywać, tajemnic wojskowych strzec, za sprawę Ojczyzny mej walczyć do ostatniego tchu w piersiach i w ogóle tak postępować abym mógł żyć i umierać jak prawy żołnierz polski. Tak mi dopomóż Bóg. Amen.

==== English translation ====
Christians
I swear to God Almighty, One in Holy Trinity, my faithful allegiance to my Fatherland, the Republic of Poland. I swear always to stand by the military banners, to uphold the constitution and guard the honour of the Polish soldier, to be obedient to the law and to the President of Poland, to faithfully carry out the orders of my commanders and superiors, to keep the military secrets, to fight for my Fatherland to the last breath in my breast, and to always behave so as to live and die as a true Polish soldier. So help me God and the sacred Passion of His Son! Amen.

Muslims
I swear to the Only God my faithful allegiance to my Fatherland, Republic of Poland. I swear always to stand by the military banners, to uphold the constitution and guard the honour of the Polish soldier, to be obedient to the law and to the President of Poland, to faithfully carry out the orders of my commanders and superiors, to keep the military secrets, to fight for my Fatherland to the last breath in my breast, to always behave so as to live and die as a true Polish soldier. Bereetjum Mine Allachivy Veresulini illeclezine a hetdeteum minel masiurkine BilWałłagi, Tałłagi, Amin.

Other denominations
I swear to God Almighty my faithful allegiance to my Fatherland, the Republic of Poland. I swear always to stand by the military banners, to uphold the constitution and guard the honour of the Polish soldier, to be obedient to the law and to the President of Poland, to faithfully carry orders of my commanders and superiors, to keep the military secrets, to fight for my Fatherland to the last breath in my breast, to always behave so as to live and die as a true Polish soldier. So help me God! Amen.

=== Armia Krajowa (WWII) ===
Since the Armia Krajowa was formed of various smaller resistance organizations, initially the words of the oath used by the Polish underground varied. The following is the text for the Christians serving in the Home Army. Other denominations used different variations of it.

==== Polish text ====
W obliczu Boga Wszechmogącego i Najświętszej Maryi Panny, Królowej Korony Polskiej, przysięgam być wierny Ojczyźnie mej, Rzeczypospolitej Polskiej. Stać nieugięcie na straży jej honoru, o wyzwolenie z niewoli walczyć ze wszystkich sił, aż do ofiary mego życia. Prezydentowi Rzeczypospolitej Polskiej, Naczelnemu Wodzowi i wyznaczonemu przezeń Dowódcy Armii Krajowej będę bezwzględnie posłuszny a tajemnicy niezłomnie dochowam, cokolwiek by mnie spotkać miało. Tak mi dopomóż Bóg.

==== English translation ====
Before God Almighty and Mary the Blessed Virgin, Queen of the Polish Crown, I pledge allegiance to my Fatherland, the Republic of Poland. I pledge to steadfastly guard Her honour, and to fight for Her liberation with all my strength, even to the extent of sacrificing my own life. I pledge unconditional obedience to the President of Poland, the Commander-in-Chief of the Republic of Poland, and the Home Army Commander who is appointed. I pledge to resolutely keep secret whatever may happen to me. So help me God!

=== Polish Armed Forces in the East (1943) ===
This oath was first taken on 15 July 1943, in Sielce, at the Oka River. It was used by the Soviet-backed military of Poland until the end of the Second World War and afterwards.

==== Polish text ====
Składam uroczystą przysięgę ziemi polskiej, broczącej we krwi, narodowi polskiemu, umęczonemu w niemieckim jarzmie, że nie skalam imienia Polaka, że wiernie będę służył Ojczyźnie.
Przysięgam ziemi polskiej i narodowi polskiemu rzetelnie pełnić obowiązki żołnierza w obozie, w pochodzie, w boju, w każdej chwili i na każdym miejscu, strzec wojskowej tajemnicy, wypełniać wiernie rozkazy oficerów i dowódców.
Przysięgam dochować wierności sojuszniczej Związkowi Radzieckiemu, który dał mi do ręki broń do walki z wspólnym wrogiem, przysięgam dochować braterstwa broni sojuszniczej Czerwonej Armii.
Przysięgam ziemi polskiej i narodowi polskiemu, że do ostatniej kropli krwi, do ostatniego tchu nienawidzieć będę wroga - Niemca, który zniszczył Polskę, do ostatniej kropli krwi, do ostatniego tchu walczyć będę o wyzwolenie Ojczyzny, abym mógł żyć i umierać jako prawy i uczciwy żołnierz Polski.
Tak mi dopomóż Bóg!

==== English translation ====
I hereby swear to the blood-rinsed Polish land, to the Polish nation tormented by the German yoke, that I will not desecrate the name of a Pole and that I will courageously serve my Fatherland.
I swear to the Polish land and to the Polish people that I will honestly serve the duties of a soldier, on the march and in battle, in the camp and at any other moment, I will guard the secrets and fulfil the orders of my officers and commanders.
I swear to be a loyal ally of the Soviet Union, which gave me the arms to fight our common enemy, and I swear I will preserve the brotherhood of arms with the allied Red Army.
I swear to the Polish land and to the Polish nation that to the last drop of blood, to the last breath shall I hate the enemy - the German who destroyed Poland; to the last drop of blood, to the last breath shall I fight for the liberation of my Fatherland, so that I could live and die as a rightful and honest soldier of Poland.
So help me God!

=== Polish People's Army 1944 ===
==== Polish text ====
Przysięgam uroczyście skrwawionej Ziemi Polskiej i Narodowi Polskiemu walczyć z niemieckim najeźdźcą o wyzwolenie Ojczyzny oraz utrwalenie wolności, niepodległości i potęgi Rzeczypospolitej Polskiej. Przysięgam rzetelnie i sumiennie wypełniać obowiązki żołnierza polskiego, wiernie wykonywać wydane mi rozkazy i ściśle przestrzegać tajemnicy wojskowej. Przysięgam wiernie służyć Rzeczypospolitej i nigdy nie skalać imienia Polaka. Przysięgam dochować wierności Krajowej Radzie Narodowej, Władzy Naczelnej Narodu Polskiego. Przysięgam nieugięcie stać na straży praw Narodu Polskiego, mieć wszystkich obywateli w równym poszanowaniu oraz niezłomnie bronić swobód demokratycznych. Tak mi dopomóż Bóg!

=== Polish People's Army oath (1947 variant) ===
==== Polish text ====
Przysięgam uroczyście Narodowi Polskiemu: walczyć do ostatniego tchu w obronie Ojczyzny wyzwolonej z przemocy niemieckiej i niezłomnie strzec wolności, niepodległości i mocy Rzeczypospolitej Polskiej. Przysięgam wypełniać rzetelnie i sumiennie obowiązki żołnierza, wykonywać wiernie rozkazy przełożonych, przestrzegać ściśle regulaminów i dochować tajemnicy wojskowej. Przysięgam służyć ze wszystkich sił Rzeczypospolitej Polskiej, bronić niezłomnie Jej ustroju demokratycznego i dochować wierności Prezydentowi Rzeczypospolitej. Przysięgam stać nieugięcie na straży praw Ludu Polskiego, mieć wszystkich obywateli w równym poszanowaniu i nigdy nie splamić godności Polaka. Tak mi dopomóż Bóg!

==== English ====
I pledge to the people of Poland to fight for the last breath in defense of the Fatherland liberated from German violence and steadfastly help in the defense of the freedom, independence and strength of the Republic of Poland. I promise thus to fulfill the duties of a soldier faithfully and conscientiously, to execute faithfully the orders of the superiors above me, to strictly observe the regulations and laws of the armed forces and preserve secrecy within it, to be of service of all the military forces of the Republic of Poland, defend her democratic system undoubtedly and keep my loyalty to the President of the Republic of Poland, and to stand firm in guarding the rights of the Polish people, promote the equality of all its citizens, and to defend the honor and dignity of the Polish nation. So help me God!

=== Polish People's Army oath (1952-1988) ===
==== Polish text ====
Ja, obywatel Polskiej Rzeczypospolitej Ludowej, stając w szeregach Wojska Polskiego, przysięgam Narodowi Polskiemu być uczciwym, zdyscyplinowanym, mężnym i czujnym żołnierzem, wykonywać dokładnie rozkazy przełożonych i przepisy regulaminów, dochować ściśle tajemnicy wojskowej i państwowej, nie splamić nigdy honoru i godności żołnierza polskiego. Przysięgam służyć ze wszystkich sił Ojczyźnie, bronić niezłomnie praw ludu pracującego, zawarowanych w Konstytucji, stać nieugięcie na straży władzy ludowej, dochować wierności Rządowi Polskiej Rzeczypospolitej Ludowej. Przysięgam strzec niezłomnie wolności, niepodległości i granic Polskiej Rzeczypospolitej Ludowej przed zakusami imperializmu, stać nieugięcie na straży pokoju w braterskim przymierzu z Armią Radziecką i innymi sojuszniczymi armiami i w razie potrzeby nie szczędząc krwi ani życia mężnie walczyć w obronie Ojczyzny, o świętą sprawę niepodległości, wolności i szczęścia ludu. Gdybym nie bacząc na tę moją uroczystą przysięgę obowiązek wierności wobec Ojczyzny złamał, niechaj mnie dosięgnie surowa ręka sprawiedliwości ludowej.

==== English ====
I, a citizen of the Polish People's Republic, standing in the ranks of the Polish Army, swear to the Polish Nation to be an honest, disciplined, brave and vigilant soldier, to follow the orders of my superiors and the provisions of the regulations, strictly keep military and state secrets, never taint the honor and dignity of a Polish soldier. I swear to serve my motherland with all my strength, to defend steadfastly the rights of the working people, enshrined in the Constitution, to stand steadfastly in guarding the people's authority, and to be faithful to the Government of the People's Republic of Poland. I swear to steadfastly guard the freedom, independence and borders of the Polish People's Republic against imperialism, to stand steadfastly in guarding peace in a fraternal alliance with the Soviet Army and other allied armies and, if necessary, sparing my blood and life, bravely fight in defense of the Fatherland, for the sacred cause of independence, freedom and the happiness of the people. If, disregarding my solemn oath, I had broken my duty of faithfulness to the Fatherland, let the stern hand of the people's justice reach me.

=== 1988 ===
==== Polish text ====
Ja, obywatel Polskiej Rzeczypospolitej Ludowej, stając w szeregach Wojska Polskiego,
Przysięgam służyć wiernie Ojczyźnie i narodowi swemu, przestrzegać zasad Konstytucji, być godnym chlubnych tradycji oręża polskiego.
Przysięgam, iż nie szczędząc trudu, a w potrzebie krwi własnej ani życia, stać będę nieugięcie na straży niepodległości, suwerenności i granic kraju ojczystego, strzec pokoju w braterstwie broni z sojuszniczymi armiami.
Przysięgam dbać o honor i dobre imię wojska, sumiennie spełniać powinności żołnierskie, ściśle wykonywać rozkazy przełożonych, być zdyscyplinowanym i mężnym, uczciwym i koleżeńskim żołnierzem. Przysięgam zdobywać wiedzę i umiejętności wojskowe, troszczyć się o powierzoną mi broń, sprzęt i mienie, dochować tajemnicy państwowej i służbowej.
Składając tę uroczystą przysięgę, jestem świadom swej odpowiedzialności wobec narodu i praw socjalistycznego państwa polskiego.

==== English ====
I, a citizen of the Polish People's Republic, standing in the ranks of the Polish Armed Forces, swear that:
I will serve my homeland and people faithfully, to abide by the principles of the Constitution, to be worthy of the glorious traditions of the Polish armed services.
I swear that I will spare no effort, and in the need of my own blood or my life, I will stand steadfastly guarding the independence, sovereignty and borders of my country, and guarding peace in brotherhood of arms with allied armies.
I swear to care for the honor and good name of the army, to diligently fulfill my military duties, strictly follow the orders of my superiors, to be a disciplined and brave, honest and friendly soldier. I swear to acquire military knowledge and skills, to take care of the weapons, equipment and property entrusted to me, and to keep the state and official secrets.
Taking this solemn oath, I am aware of my responsibility towards the nation and the rights of the socialist Polish state.

=== 1989 ===
Following the establishment of the Third Polish Republic in 1989 and changing the name of the state: Polska Rzeczpospolita Ludowa to Rzeczpospolita Polska, the oath was changed, esp. the reference to "socialist Polish state" has been deleted from old text.

==== Polish text ====
Ja, obywatel Rzeczypospolitej Polskiej, stając w szeregach Wojska Polskiego,
Przysięgam służyć wiernie Ojczyźnie i narodowi swemu, przestrzegać zasad Konstytucji, być godnym chlubnych tradycji oręża polskiego.
Przysięgam, iż nie szczędząc trudu, a w potrzebie krwi własnej ani życia, stać będę nieugięcie na straży niepodległości, suwerenności i granic kraju ojczystego, strzec pokoju w braterstwie broni z sojuszniczymi armiami.
Przysięgam dbać o honor i dobre imię wojska, sumiennie spełniać powinności żołnierskie, ściśle wykonywać rozkazy przełożonych, być zdyscyplinowanym i mężnym, uczciwym i koleżeńskim żołnierzem. Przysięgam zdobywać wiedzę i umiejętności wojskowe, troszczyć się o powierzoną mi broń, sprzęt i mienie, dochować tajemnicy państwowej i służbowej. Składając tę uroczystą przysięgę, jestem świadom swej odpowiedzialności wobec narodu i praw Rzeczypospolitej Polskiej.
Ku Chwale Ojczyzny,
Na Sztandar,
Przysięgam.

==== English ====
I, a citizen of the Republic of Poland, standing in the ranks of the Polish Armed Forces, swear thus:
that I pledge to serve my homeland and people faithfully, to abide by the principles of the Constitution, to be worthy of the glorious traditions of the Polish armed services.
I swear that, sparing no effort, and in the need of my own blood and my life, I will stand steadfastly guarding the independence, sovereignty and borders of my homeland, and in guarding peace in the brotherhood of arms with allied armies.
I swear to care for the honor and good name of the armed forces, to diligently fulfill my military duties, strictly follow the orders of my superiors placed above me, to be a disciplined and brave, honest and friendly soldier/sailor/aircraftman. I swear to acquire military knowledge and skills, to take care of the weapons, equipment and property entrusted to me, and to keep state and official secrets. By taking this solemn oath, I am aware of my responsibility towards the nation and the laws of the Republic of Poland.
For the Glory of the Fatherland, To its colours, I therefore pledge, (so help me God).

=== Modern oath (since 1992) ===
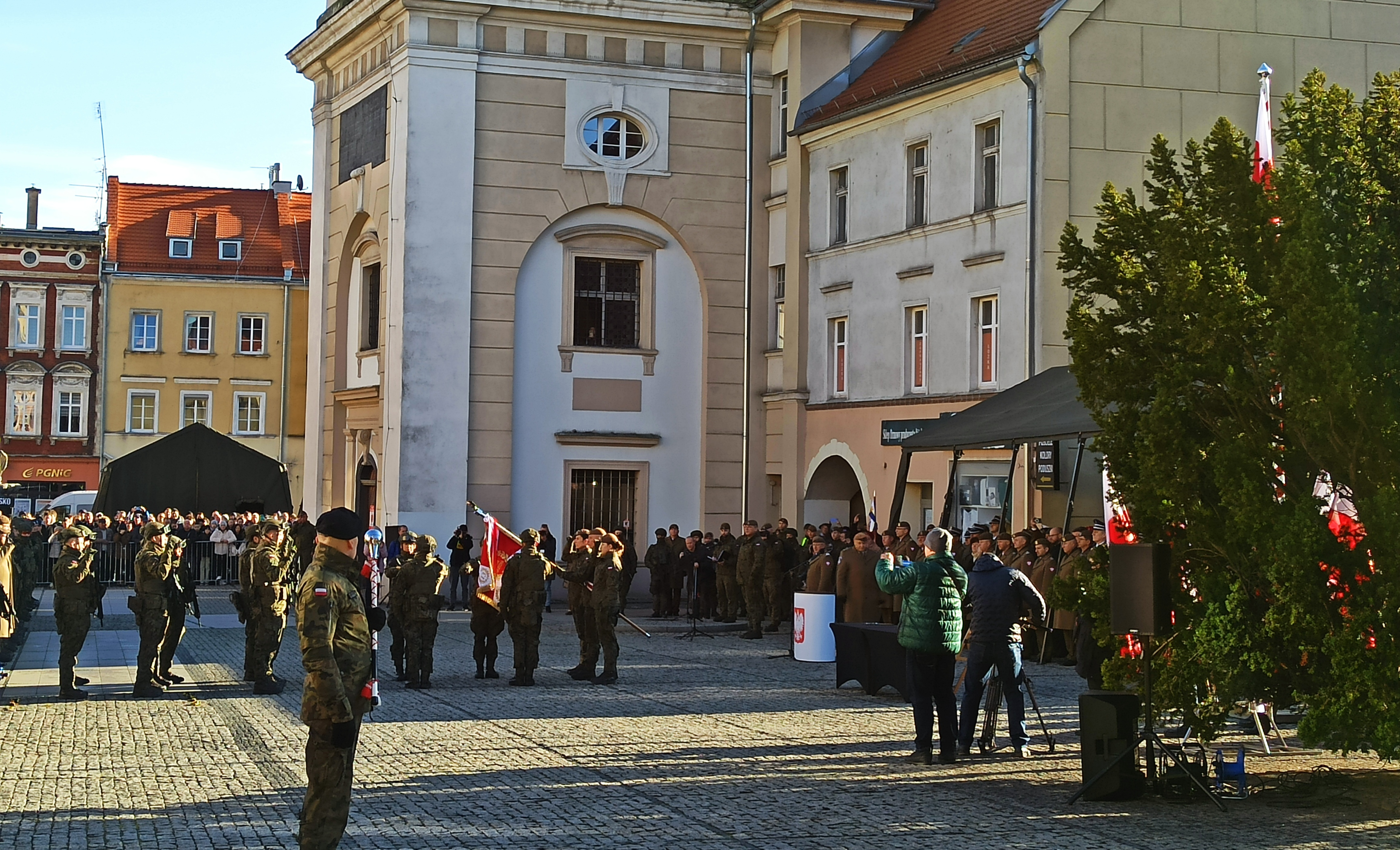
Soldiers taking an oath at the Market Square in Prudnik, 2024

In 1992 the oath was changed again and significantly shortened. There is only one oath for all denominations, although each soldier can omit the last line according to their own beliefs.

==== Polish ====
Ja żołnierz Wojska Polskiego,
Przysięgam,
Służyć wiernie Rzeczypospolitej Polskiej,
Bronić jej niepodległości i granic,
Stać na straży Konstytucji,
Strzec honoru żołnierza polskiego,
Sztandaru wojskowego bronić,
Za sprawę mojej Ojczyzny,
W potrzebie krwi własnej ani
życia nie szczędzić,
Tak mi dopomóż Bóg!

==== English ====
I, a soldier of the Polish Armed Forces,
Fully swear,
To Serve loyally to the Republic of Poland,
Defend her independence and borders,
Stand on guard of the Constitution,
Defend the honour of a Polish soldier,
Defend the military colours and standards of the armed forces,
In the sake of my Fatherland,
Even at the cost of losing my life or blood.
So help me God!
