= Józef Świeżyński =

Polish politician (1868–1948)

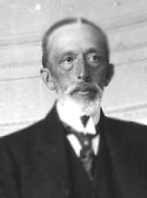

4th Prime Minister of the Regency Kingdom of Poland
- In office 23 October 1918 – 4 November 1918
- Monarch: Rada Regencyjna (Regency Council)
- Preceded by: Jan Kanty Steczkowski
- Succeeded by: Władysław Wróblewski

Personal details
- Born: 19 April 1868 Wlonice, Radom Governorate, Congress Poland
- Died: 12 February 1948 (aged 79) Sandomierz, Polish People's Republic
- Party: Liga Narodowa
- Profession: physician

Józef Świeżyński (Polish pronunciation: [ˈjuzɛf ɕfjɛˈʐɨj̃skʲi]; Russian: Ио́сиф Владисла́вович Свежи́нский; 19 April 1868 – 12 February 1948) was the prime minister of the Kingdom of Poland for a short time — from 23 October 1918 to 4 November 1918.

== Citations ==
Political offices
Preceded by Jan Kanty Steczkowski	Prime Minister of Poland; 23 October 1918—5 November 1918	Succeeded by Władysław Wróblewski
