= Władysław Wróblewski =

Polish szlachcic, politician, scientist, diplomat and lawyer

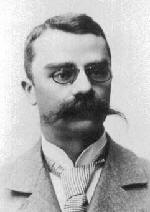

5th Prime Minister of the Regency Kingdom of Poland
- In office 4 November 1918 – 11 November 1918
- Monarch: Rada Regencyjna (Regency Council)
- Preceded by: Józef Świeżyński
- Succeeded by: Ignacy Daszyński (As Prime Minister of the Second Polish Republic)

Minister of Foreign Affairs
- In office 13 December 1919 – 16 December 1919
- Prime Minister: Leopold Skulski
- Preceded by: Ignacy Jan Paderewski
- Succeeded by: Stanisław Patek
- In office 4 November 1918 – 14 November 1918
- Prime Minister: Himself; Ignacy Daszyński
- Preceded by: Stanisław Głąbiński
- Succeeded by: Leon Wasilewski

Personal details
- Born: 21 March 1875 Kraków, Galicia, Austria-Hungary
- Died: 19 August 1951 (aged 76) Łódź, Polish People's Republic

Władysław Wróblewski (Polish pronunciation: [vwaˈdɨswaf vruˈblɛfskʲi]; 21 March 1875, Kraków – 19 August 1951, Łódź) was a Polish szlachcic, politician, scientist, diplomat and lawyer. He is notable as the last provisional prime minister of the German-controlled puppet state of Regency Kingdom before Poland regained their independence in 1918.

== Biography ==
Władysław was the son of Wincenty Wróblewski and Waleria (née Bossowska) and brother of lawyer, Stanisław Wróblewski. He was from noble family of Lubicz coat of arms.

Wróblewski was a notable lawyer and docent of administration and administrative law at the Jagiellonian University in Kraków. On November 4, 1918, after the withdrawal of Józef Świeżyński's provisional government, Wróblewski was chosen by the Regency Council to act as the head of a new temporary provisional government. As the situation in Poland was changing rapidly, Wróblewski chose not to appoint his own ministers and instead continued the job of his predecessor, with the same set of ministers. The last meeting of his government took place on November 11 of that year, when all powers were ceded to Józef Piłsudski, who got back from prison in Magdeburg Fortress earlier that day.

On November 18, all ministries were taken by the new government of Jędrzej Moraczewski and the Regency Kingdom ceased to exist, giving way to the reborn Republic of Poland. Afterwards he remained an active member of the Polish administration, initially as an undersecretary of state at the Council of Ministers and later as a diplomat. Among other posts, he was the Polish ambassador in London and later in Washington. Between 1929 and 1936, he headed the Bank Polski, the central bank of Poland.

== See also ==
- House of Wróblewski (Lubicz)

Political offices
Preceded by Józef Świeżyński	Prime Minister of Kingdom of Poland; 1918	Succeeded by Jędrzej Moraczewski
