= Polish Armed Forces (1917–1918) =

Military of German puppet Kingdom of Poland during WWI

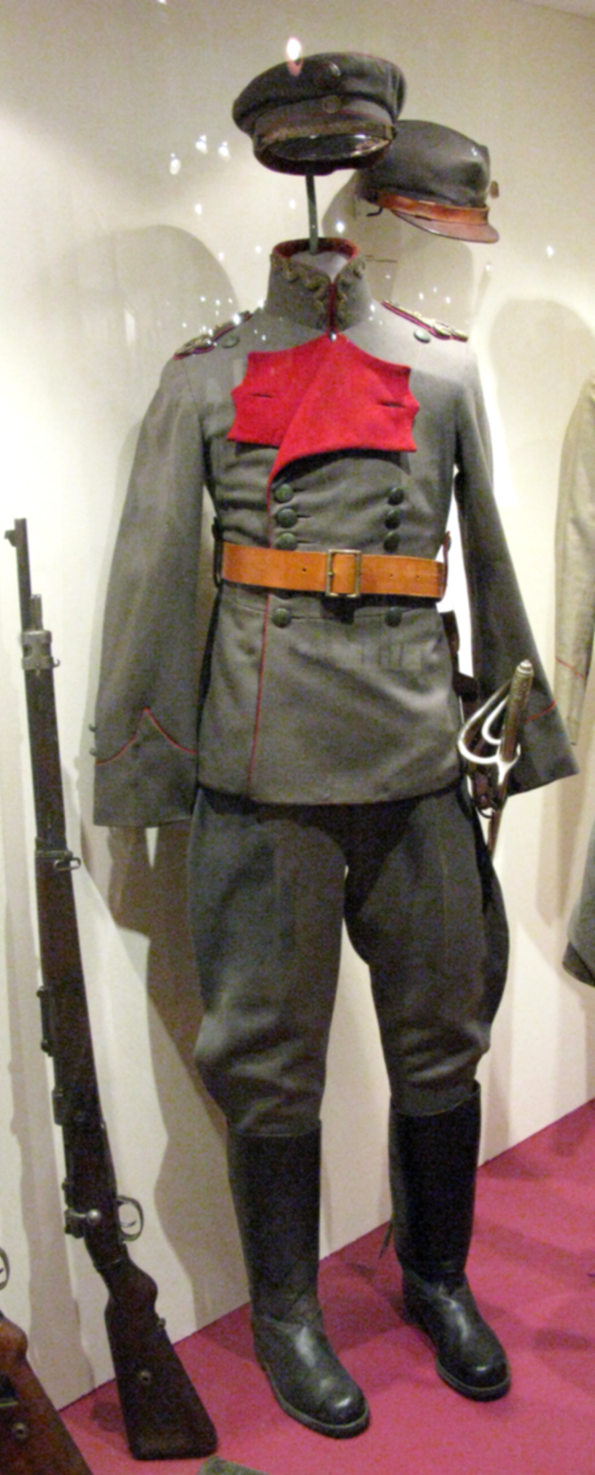
Lieutenant uniform of the Polish Armed Forces

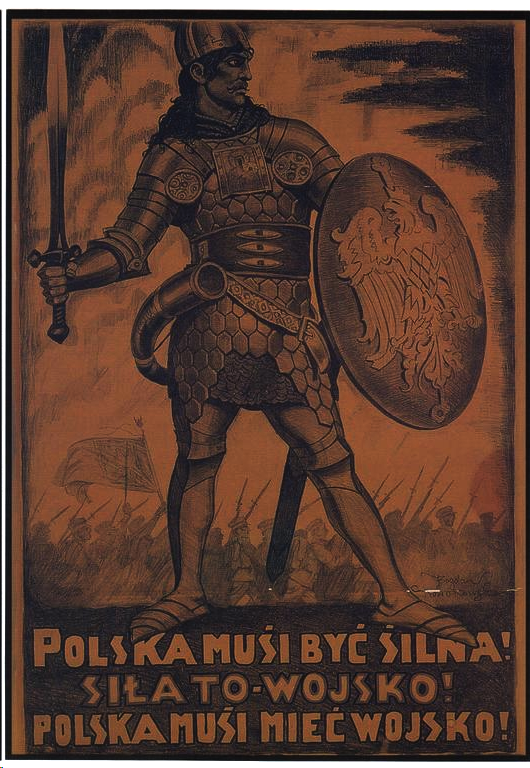
Recruitment poster for the Polnische Wehrmacht, 1918

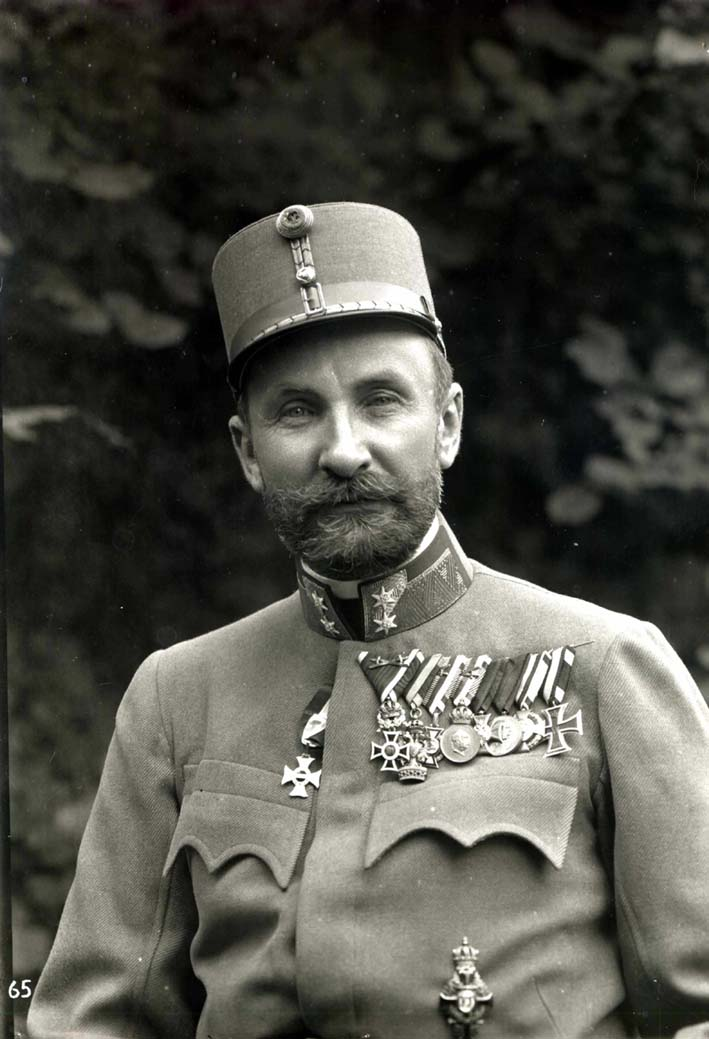
The Chief of Staff of the Polish Armed Forces, Tadeusz Jordan-Rozwadowski in an Austro-Hungarian military uniform, 1918

The Polish Armed Forces (Polish: Polska Siła Zbrojna, German: Polnische Wehrmacht) was a military force created during World War I. It was created from the more Polish dominated, Polish Auxiliary Corps (also called Polish Legions), headed by Pilsudski. It was the armed forces of the puppet Kingdom of Poland envisioned by the Prussian Mitteleuropa Plan. The results of the recruiting campaign were dismal. The Polish Armed Forces was nevertheless established as part of the German Army and under complete German command. The commander-in-chief of the Polish Armed Forces was Governor-general Hans Hartwig von Beseler, while the "de facto" commander was Infantry General Felix von Barth, head of the training branch.

The Polish Armed Forces was created on 10 April 1917 as a result of the Act of 5th November of 1916 and the creation of the Kingdom of Poland. The backbone of the Polish Armed Forces were the soldiers of the Polish Legions (Polish Auxiliary Corps) fighting together with the Austro-Hungarian Army against Russia.

As a result of the Oath Crisis of July 1917, 3/4ths of the soldiers of the Polish Legions refused to pledge allegiance to the German Kaiser. Approximately 15,000 of them were confined in internment camps in Beniaminów and Szczypiorno, while almost 3,000 were drafted into the Austro-Hungarian Army. Despite the planned force of 70,000, only 5,000 declared loyalty to the Kaiser. After the command of the unit was transferred to the Polish Regency Council on 19 October 1918, the number soon reached 9,000. After Poland declared independence on 11 November 1918, the Polish Armed Forces became the basis of the newly formed Polish Army.

== See also ==
- Polish Legions in World War I
