= Franciszek Pius Radziwiłł =

Polish noble and political activist

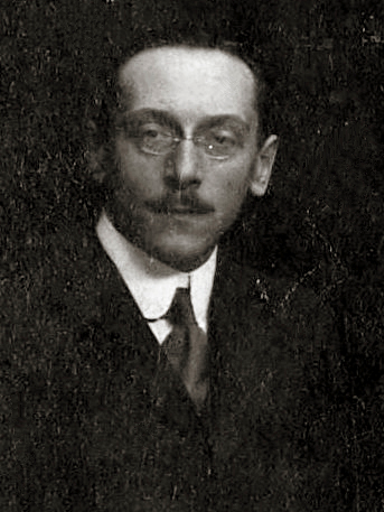

Director of the Military Commission
- In office 2 July 1917 – 27 February 1918
- Monarch: Provisional Council of State
- Preceded by: Ludwik Górski
- Succeeded by: Jan Wroczyński

Personal details
- Born: 1 February 1878 Rome, Kingdom of Italy
- Died: 1 December 1944 (aged 66) Głogówek
- Parent: Maciej Józef Radziwiłł (father)
- Awards: Order of Polonia Restituta; Cross of Merit

Franciszek Pius Radziwiłł (1 February 1878, in Rome – 1 December 1944) was a Polish noble (prince) and political activist. He was the director of the Military Commission in the Provisional Council of State (1917) and in the government of Jan Kanty Steczkowski in 1918.
