= Oath crisis =

1917 German-Polish political crisis

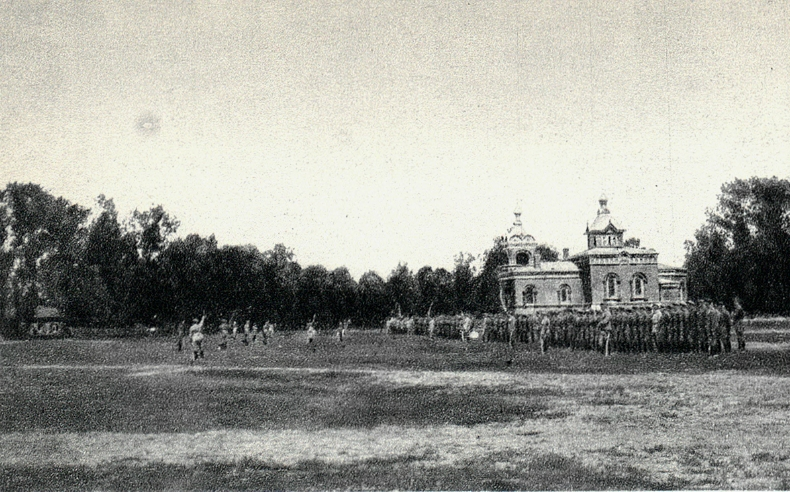
- Date: July 1917
- Location: Poland
- Type: Political conflict
- Cause: Refusal of Polish troops to swear allegiance to Kaiser Wilhelm II of Germany
- Convictions: Józef Piłsudski and Kazimierz Sosnkowski

The Oath crisis (Polish: Kryzys przysięgowy; German: Eidkrise) was a political conflict during World War I between the Imperial German Army command and the Józef Piłsudski-led Polish Legions.

Initially supporting the Central Powers against Imperial Russia, Piłsudski hoped for the defeat of one of the partitioning powers, Russia, with the help of the other two partitioning states, Austria-Hungary and Germany. However, after Russia was defeated in 1917 it became clear that the Central Powers were not going to guarantee the independence of Poland. Despite the Act of November 5th of 1916 and the creation of the Kingdom of Poland, it was apparent that the newly created state would be little more than a puppet buffer-state for Germany as part of its Mitteleuropa plan.

At this point, Piłsudski decided to switch allegiances to gain the support of the Entente, particularly France and the United Kingdom, for the cause of Polish independence. A good pretext appeared in July 1917, when the Central Powers demanded that the soldiers of the Polish Legions swear allegiance and obedience to Kaiser Wilhelm II. Persuaded by Piłsudski, the majority of the soldiers of the 1st and 3rd Brigades of the Legions declined to take the oath. In the end, soldiers who were citizens of Austrian Empire (roughly 3,000) were then forcibly drafted into the Austro-Hungarian Army, demoted to the rank of private and sent to the Italian Front, while those born in other parts of occupied Poland were interned in prisoner of war camps in Szczypiorno and Beniaminów. Approximately 7,500 soldiers (mostly from the 2nd Brigade of the Legions) remained in the rump Polish Auxiliary Corps, part of the Polnische Wehrmacht. Piłsudski himself and his Chief of Staff Kazimierz Sosnkowski were arrested on 22 July 1917 and interned in the German fortress at Magdeburg.

In protest against the internment of Polish soldiers, the members of the Provisional Council of State (the main authority in the Kingdom at that time) resigned their seats, which led to the full dissolution of the Council. It was later replaced by the Regency Council.

== See also ==
- Polish Army oaths
