= Szczypiorno =

- Neighbourhood
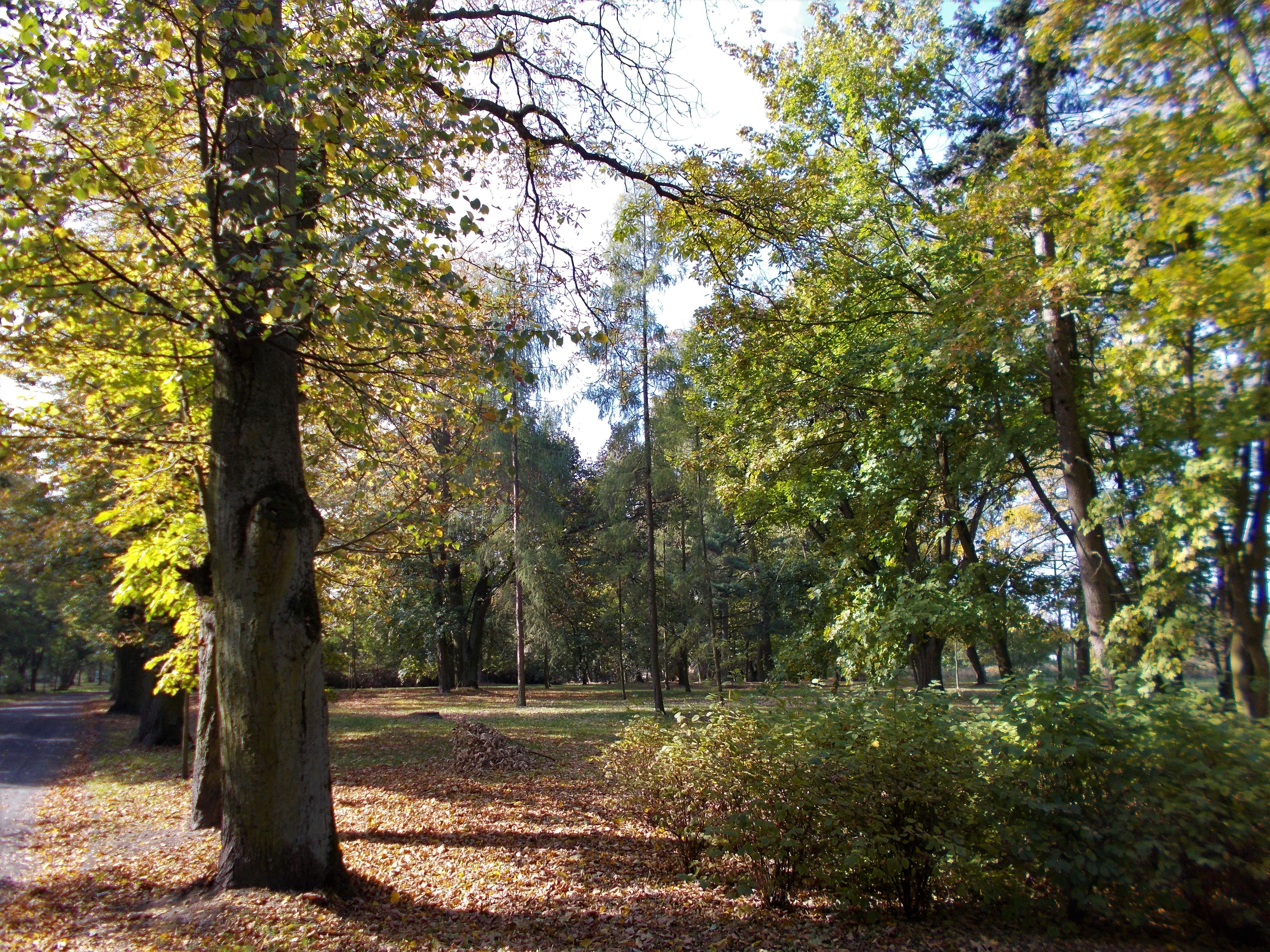
- Park in Szczypiorno

- Location within Poland Location within Greater Poland Voivodeship
- Coordinates: 51°45′27″N 18°04′48″E
- Country: Poland
- Voivodeship: Greater Poland
- City: Kalisz
- Within city limits: 1976
- Time zone: UTC+1 (CET)
  - Summer (DST): UTC+2 (CEST)
- Vehicle registration: PK, PA

Szczypiorno [ʂt͡ʂɨˈpjɔrnɔ] is a municipal neighbourhood of the city of Kalisz, Poland, located in its south-western part. Formerly until 1976 a separate village at the outskirts of the city, it is best known as a seat of a World War I and Polish–Soviet War prisoner of war camp and the name-sake for szczypiorniak, the Polish language name for the game of handball.

== Transport ==
The borough is located along the National Road 25 linking Kalisz with Ostrów Wielkopolski. There is a Kalisz Szczypiorno railway station located in the neighbourhood.

== History ==
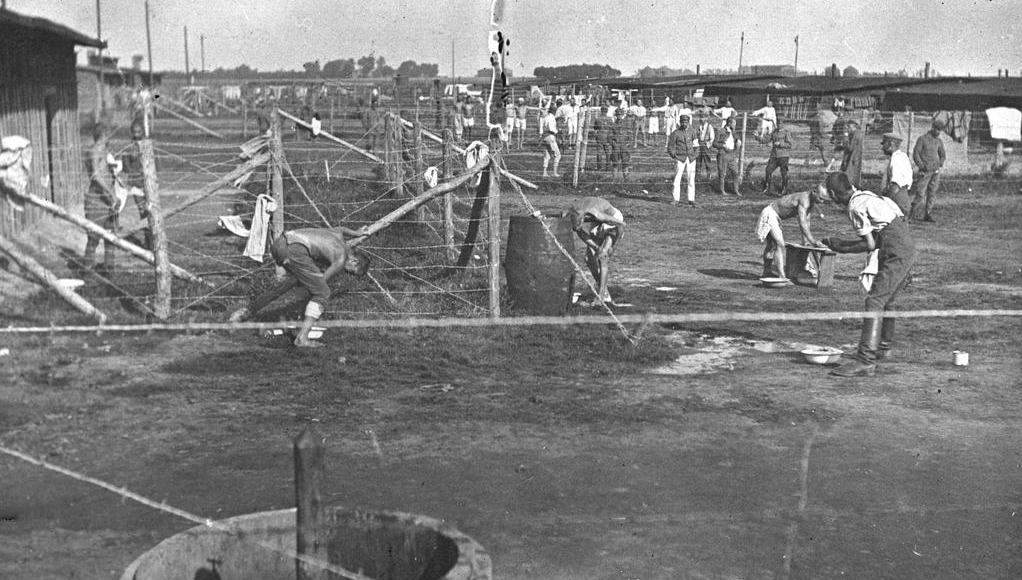
Interned Polish soldiers in Szczypiorno during World War I

As part of the region of Greater Poland, i.e. the cradle of the Polish state, the area formed part of Poland since its establishment in the 10th century. Szczypiorno was a private village of Polish nobility, incl. the Scipierski family, administratively located in the Kalisz County in the Kalisz Voivodeship in the Greater Poland Province of the Kingdom of Poland. In the 19th century Szczypiorno with its garden, forest and restaurants was a popular recreation place for the inhabitants of nearby Kalisz.

During World War I the village housed a German-built prisoner of war camp for soldiers of the Polish Legions following their internment in the aftermath of the so-called Oath crisis. It was there that the internees first started playing a game of handball, that later became popular with the reborn Polish Army and general population. Because of that the game is still commonly referred to as szczypiorniak in Polish.

After World War I the camp remained operational for POWs from Germany and Soviet Russia. As mny as 8,000 Germans were interned for several months. Among the interned was the head of the United Evangelical Church in Poznań, Paul Blau, along with 39 other pastors who were not allowed to travel to Berlin after their release for "political reasons". In July 1919, the church was handed over to the Polish Lutheran Church. Disbanded some time in the early 1920s, it was turned into a Central School of Prison Service, still operational. The 2nd Battalion of the 29th Kaniowski Rifle Regiment of the Polish Army was stationed in Szczypiorno in the interbellum.

Following the joint German-Soviet invasion of Poland, which started World War II in September 1939, the village was occupied by Germany and renamed, first to Friedersbrunn and then to Deutschehren, to erase traces of Polish origin. In 1942, the occupiers carried out expulsions of Poles, who were deported to forced labour in Germany and German-annexed Austria, while their houses and farms were handed over to German colonists as part of the Lebensraum policy.

In 1976 the village was incorporated into the city of Kalisz.

== See also ==
- Oath crisis
