= Antoni Ponikowski =

Polish politician (1878–1949)

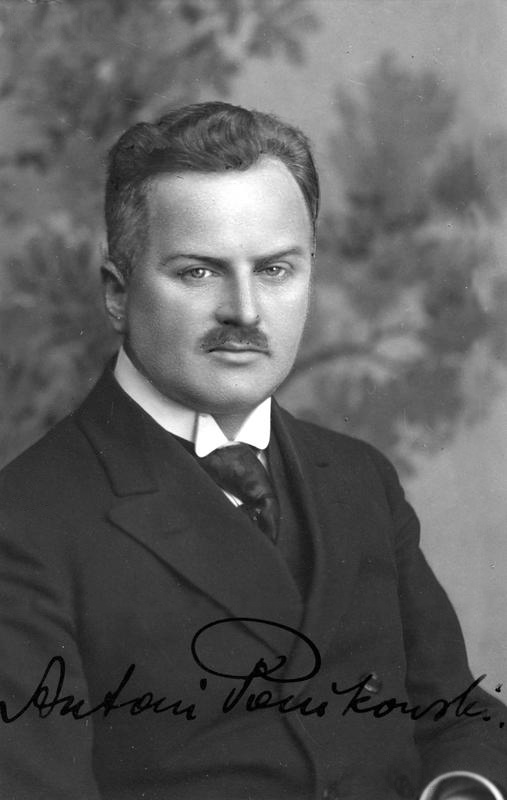

Prime Minister of Poland
- In office 19 September 1921 – 6 June 1922
- Chief of State: Józef Piłsudski
- Preceded by: Wincenty Witos
- Succeeded by: Artur Śliwiński
- In office 27 February 1918 – 4 April 1918
- Monarch: Regency Council
- Preceded by: Jan Kucharzewski
- Succeeded by: Jan Kanty Steczkowski

Personal details
- Born: Antoni Józef Ponikowski; 29 May 1878 Siedlce, Congress Poland
- Died: 27 December 1949 (aged 71) Warsaw, Polish People's Republic
- Resting place: Powązki Cemetery
- Party: National Democratic Party; Polish Christian Democratic Party
- Spouse: Karolina Opolska (Karolina Ponikowska)
- Children: seven
- Profession: Academician

Antoni Józef Ponikowski (Polish: [anˈtɔɲi pɔɲiˈkɔfskʲi]; May 29, 1878 – December 27, 1949) was a Polish academician and politician who served as the 7th Prime Minister of Poland in 1918 and from 1921 to 1922.

Political offices
Preceded by Wincenty Witos	Prime Minister of Poland; 1921–1922	Succeeded by Artur Śliwiński
