= Regency Council (Poland) =

Legislative branch of the Kingdom of Poland (1917–1918)

- Rada Regencyjna Królestwa Polskiego
- Rada Regencyjna

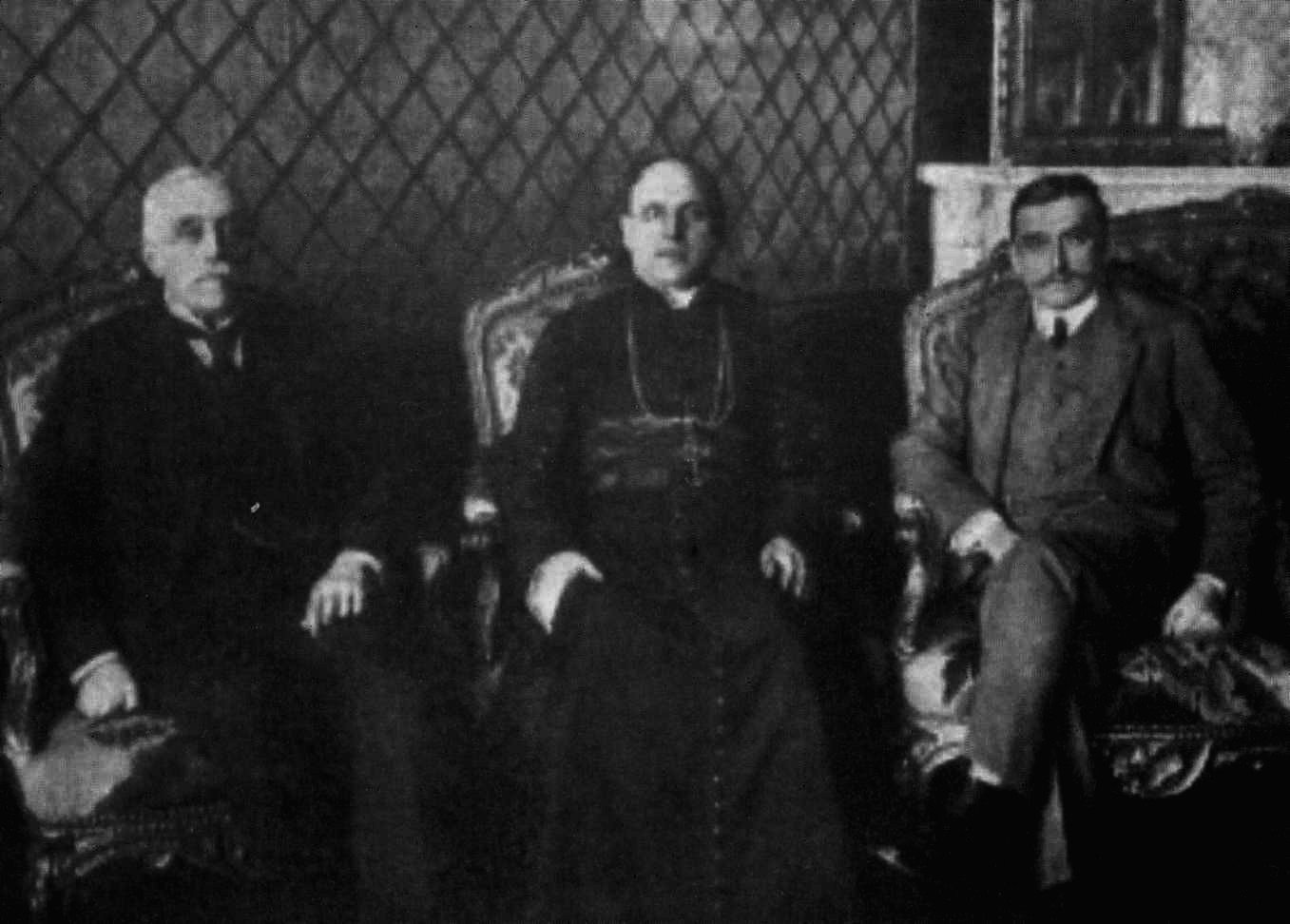
- Predecessor: Provisional Council of State
- Successor: Józef Piłsudski
- Formation: 27 October 1917
- Founder: German Empire and Austria-Hungary
- Dissolved: 14 November 1918
- Legal status: Regency
- Headquarters: Royal Castle, Warsaw
- Location: Kingdom of Poland
- Official language: Polish
- King of Poland: None
- Regents: Aleksander Kakowski, Zdzisław Lubomirski, Józef Ostrowski
- Main organ: Dziennik Ustaw

The Regency Council of the Kingdom of Poland (Polish: Rada Regencyjna, or Rada Regencyjna Królestwa Polskiego) was a semi-independent and provisional appointed authority in Poland during World War I. It was formed by Imperial Germany and Austria-Hungary within historically Polish lands in September 1917 after the dissolution of the previous authority, the Provisional Council of State, due to the Oath crisis.

The council was supposed to stay in office until the appointment of a new monarch or regent. On 7 October 1918, the Regency Council declared the independence of Poland. That same month, the council took over command of the Polish Armed Forces.

== History ==
The members of the Regency Council included Cardinal Aleksander Kakowski, archbishop of Warsaw; Prince Zdzisław Lubomirski, mayor of Warsaw; and landowner Józef Ostrowski, conservative politician and former chairman of the Polish Club in the Imperial Duma.

Together with the State Council and other branches of the government, the Regency Council exercised limited administrative powers, mainly in education and justice. In spite of this, the Council made some crucial decisions, like creation of Dziennik Ustaw, the most important Polish publication of legal acts.

On 7 October 1918, the council declared the independence of Poland from Germany and Austria-Hungary. On 11 November, it transferred its military authority, and on 14 November the rest of its authority, to Józef Piłsudski, which led to the dissolution of the Council on the same day. Piłsudski served from 22 November as temporary chief of state of the newly independent Polish state.

=== Prime Ministers ===
- Jan Kucharzewski (November 26, 1917 – February 27, 1918)
- Antoni Ponikowski (February 27 – April 3, 1918)
- Jan Kanty Steczkowski (April 4 – October 23, 1918)
- Józef Świeżyński (October 23 – November 5, 1918)
- Władysław Wróblewski (November 5–11, 1918)
