= Jan Kucharzewski =

Prime minister of Poland (1876–1952)

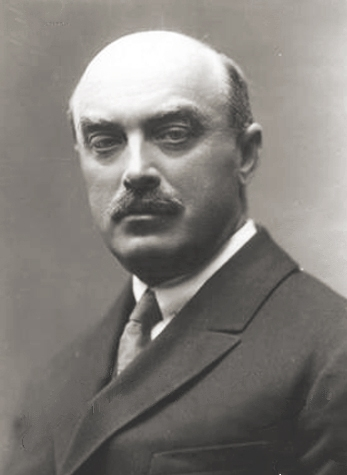

1st Prime Minister of the Regency Kingdom of Poland
- In office 7 December 1917 – 11 February 1918
- Monarch: Rada Regencyjna (Regency Council)
- Deputy: Józef Mikułowski-Pomorski
- Preceded by: Position established
- Succeeded by: Antoni Ponikowski

Personal details
- Born: 27 May 1876 Wysokie Mazowieckie, Łomża Governorate, Congress Poland
- Died: 4 July 1952 (aged 76) New York City, United States
- Profession: Historian, lawyer

Jan Kucharzewski (Polish pronunciation: [ˈjan kuxaˈʐɛfskʲi]; 27 May 1876 in Wysokie Mazowieckie – 4 July 1952) was a Polish historian, lawyer, and politician. He was the prime minister of Poland from 1917 to 1918.

In 1898 he graduated from Warsaw University. He was a member of the Zet political organization, the National Democrats (Narodowa Demokracja) movement, and the National League (Liga Narodowa) until 1911. In the first years of World War I he resided in Switzerland, where he wrote articles for the Polish cause. In June 1917 he came back to Warsaw and received a job in the administration under the Regency Council. From 26 November 1917 to 27 February 1918 he was the Minister President of the Polish government. He resigned, along with the rest of his government after the Treaty of Brest-Litovsk was signed.

After 1920 he dedicated his life to scholarly and legal work. He was named to the International Court of Arbitration in 1925. In 1940 (World War II) he went into exile in the US, where he published many works for the Polish cause, mainly from an anti-communist and anti-Soviet point of view.

== Publications ==
- Socyalizm prawniczy (1906)
- Od białego do czerwonego caratu, (vol. 1–7, 1923–35)
- The origins of modern Russia, New York, 1948
