= Provisional Council of State =

First government of the Kingdom of Poland

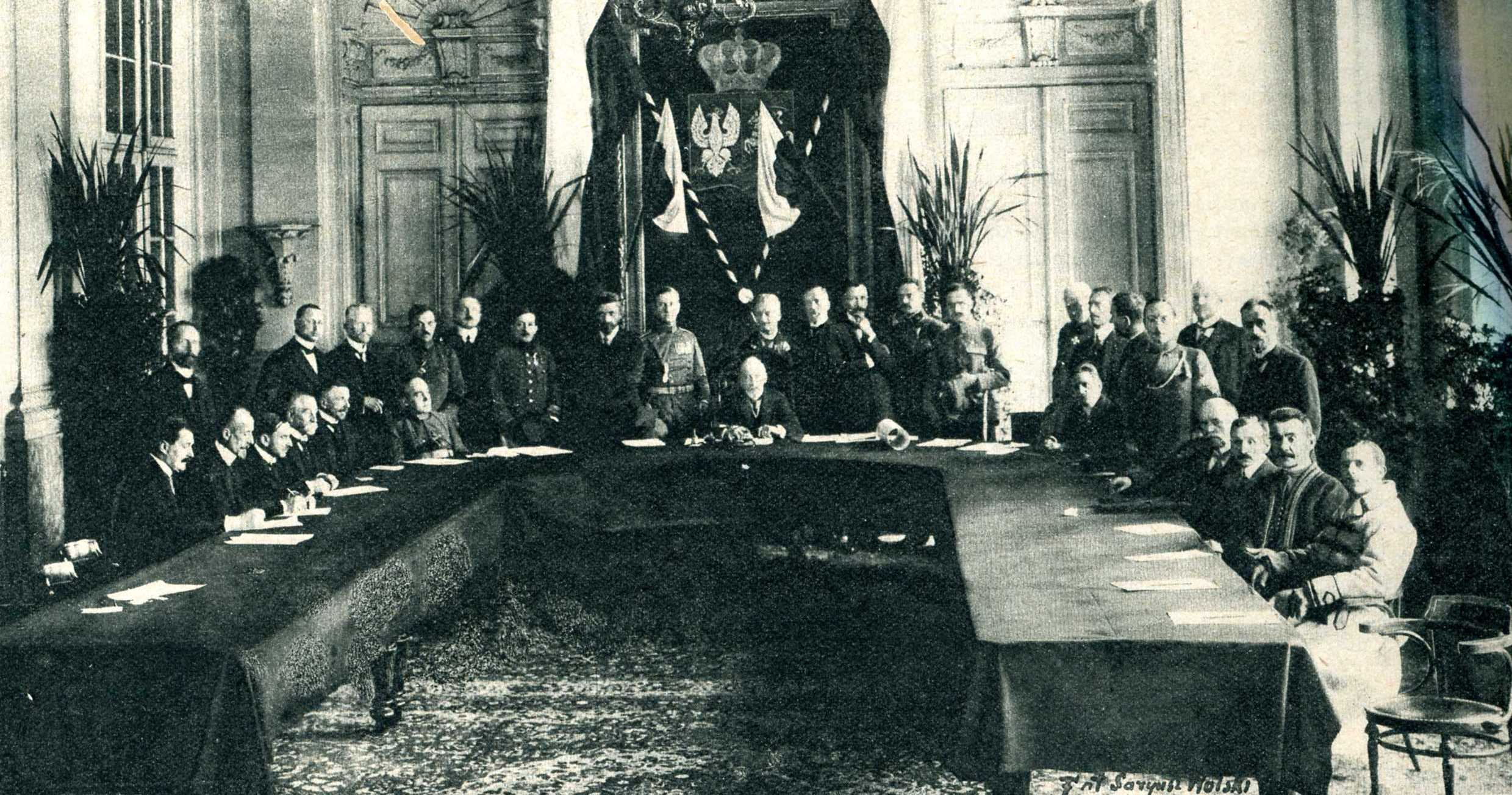
First meeting of the Provisional Council of State

The Provisional Council of State (Polish: Tymczasowa Rada Stanu, German: Provisorische Staatsrat im Königreich Polen) was the first government of the Kingdom of Poland, a puppet state created by the military authorities of Germany and Austria-Hungary on formerly Russian-controlled Polish lands during the First World War.

The Provisional Council was officially created on the basis of the Act of November 5th of 1916 and started meetings on 14 January 1917. The Council had 25 members; 10 from Austria-Hungary and 15 from Germany. Its president was Wacław Niemojowski and its vice president was Józef Mikułowski-Pomorski. Józef Piłsudski held authority over military matters.

The Council demanded more autonomy from the occupying governments, including in education. After attempts by Austria-Hungary and Germany to ensure that the Council would be a puppet body, Piłsudski resigned, which led to the oath crisis in the Polish legions in July. In its aftermath, the Council disbanded on 25 August 1917.

It was followed by the Temporary Committee of the Provisional Council of State (Komisja Przejściowa Tymczasowej Rady Stanu) and then by the Regency Council.

Members of the Council were Józef Brudziński, Stanisław Bukowiecki, Stanisław Dzierzbicki, Ludwik Górski, Józef Higersberger, Marian Januszajtis-Żegota, Kazimierz Natanson, Józef Piłsudski, Franciszek Pius Radziwiłł, Wojciech Rostworowski, Eustachy Sapieha, Stanisław Chaniewski, Stanisław Staniszewski, Władysław Studnicki, and Artur Śliwiński.
