= Act of 5th November =

1916 Central Powers promise of Polish independence

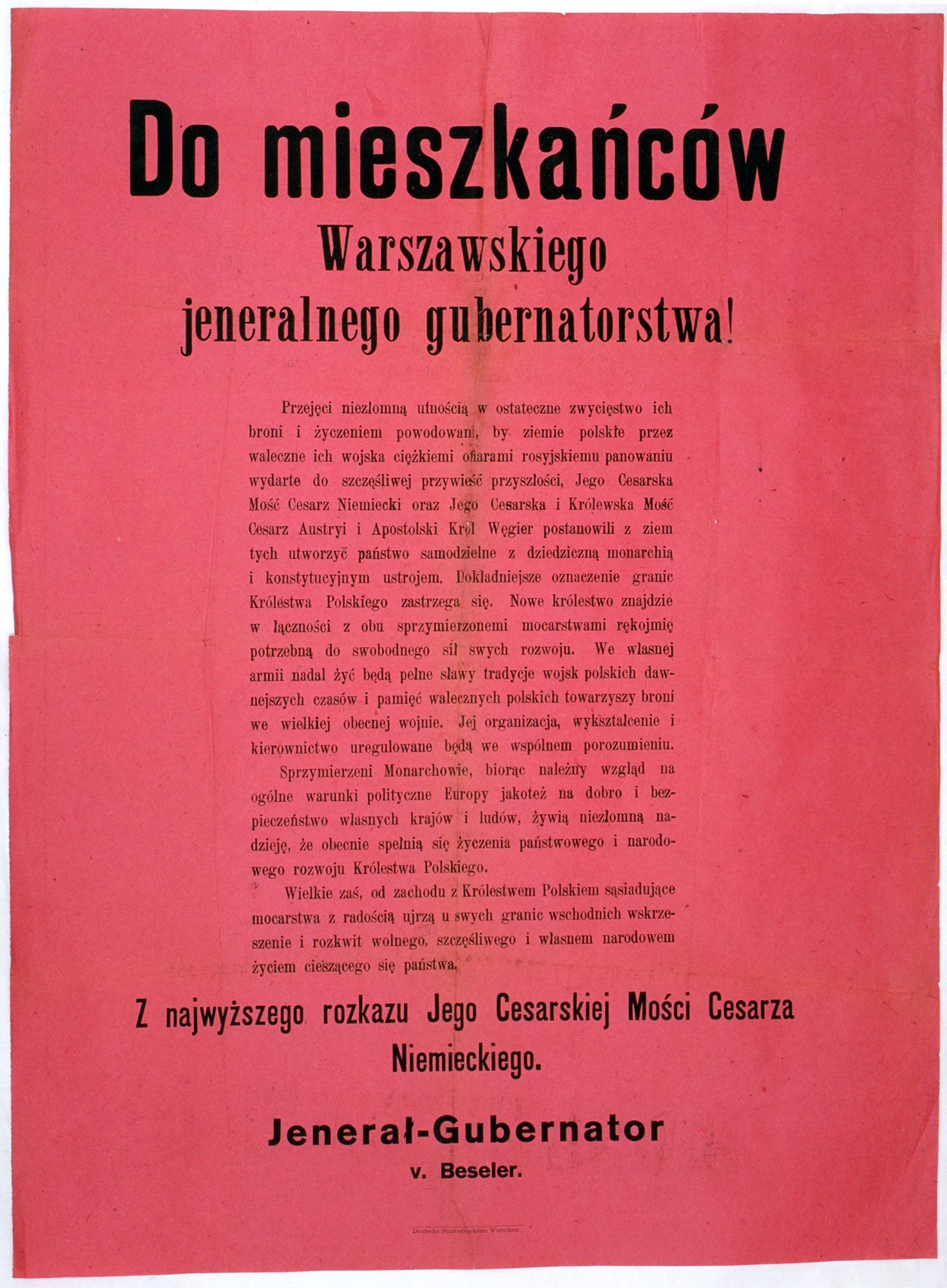
Act of 5th November

The Act of 5th November of 1916 was a declaration of Emperors Wilhelm II of Germany and Franz Joseph of Austria. This act promised the creation of the Kingdom of Poland out of territory of Congress Poland, envisioned by its authors as a puppet state controlled by the Central Powers. The origin of that document was the dire need to draft new recruits from German-occupied Poland for the war with Russia. Even though the act itself expressed very little in concrete terms, its declaration is regarded as one of main factors in the Polish efforts to regain independence. Despite official statements, the German Empire really planned to annex up to 30,000 km^{2} of prewar Congress Poland, with expulsion of between 2 and 3 million Poles and Jews out of these territories to make room for German settlers.

== Creation of the Provisional Council of State ==
Following the declaration, on 6 December 1916, the Provisional Council of State was created, with Waclaw Niemojowski as its president, and Józef Piłsudski as chairman of its Military Commission. Units of the Polish Military Organisation were put under management of the Provisional Council of State, but the council itself had very limited authority and, after the oath crisis, was disbanded in August 1917. It was followed by the Temporary Committee of the Provisional Council of State (Komisja Przejściowa Tymczasowej Rady Stanu) and then by the Regency Council.

== Plans for an independent Polish state by Italy, Russia, and the United States ==
The Act of 5th November had a wide impact among the Allies of World War I. In December 1916, the Italian Parliament supported the independence of Poland, and in early 1917, Tsar Nicholas II of Russia returned to the idea of independent Poland, tied in a union with the Russian Empire that Russian officials proposed already in 1914. At the same time, US President Woodrow Wilson also publicly expressed his support of a free Polish state.

== Proto state for the Second Polish Republic ==
Following the Armistice of 11 November 1918 ending the World War I, in spite of the previous initial total dependence of the kingdom on its sponsors, it ultimately served against their intentions as the cornerstone proto state of the nascent Second Polish Republic, the latter composed also of territories never intended by the Central Powers to be ceded to Poland.

== See also ==
- Provisional Council of State
