= Polish border strip =

German WWI annexation proposals

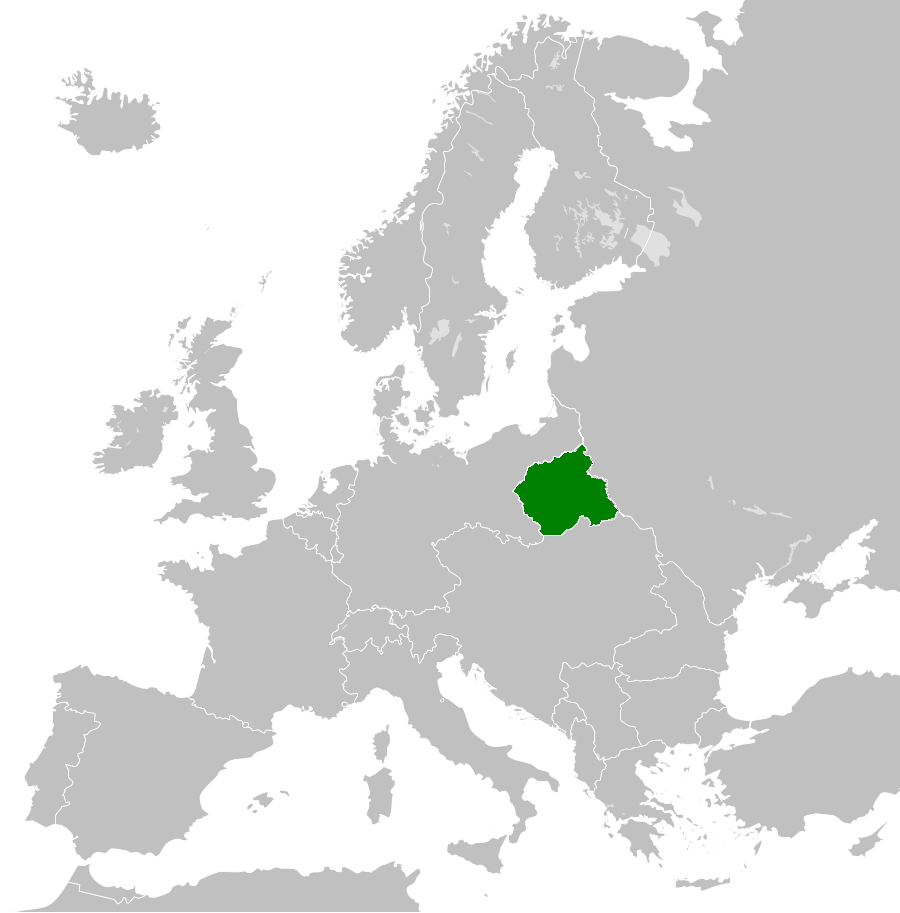
The Kingdom of Poland (1917–1918).

The term "Polish Border Strip" (German: Polnischer Grenzstreifen; Polish: polski pas graniczny), also called "Polish Frontier Strip", refers to those territories which the German Empire wanted to annex from Congress Poland after World War I. It appeared in plans proposed by German officials as a territory to be annexed by the German Empire after an expected German and Central Powers victory. German planners also envisioned forced expulsion and resettlement of the Polish and Jewish population which would be replaced by German colonists.

The proposed area of the Border Strip comprised up to 30,000 km^{2} (12,000 sq mi) (approximately the size of Belgium), and up to 3 million people were to be ethnically cleansed to make room for German settlers. The strip was also intended to separate the Polish inhabitants of Prussian-held Greater Poland from those in Russian held Congress Poland.

Some of the plans were later adopted by Nazi Germany, and implemented in the genocidal Generalplan Ost.

== Details ==
The idea of a future "buffer zone" to be cleared of Poles and Jews was discussed officially at highest levels as early as 1914. In July 1917 the German supreme command under General Ludendorff, as part of the debate and planning regarding the cession of the "border strip" to Germany, specified its own designs in a memorandum. It proposed annexing a greatly enlarged "border strip" of 20,000 square kilometres, and ethnically cleansing its Polish and Jewish population (numbering between 2,000,000 and 3,000,000) from a territory of 8,000 square kilometres and settling it with ethnic Germans. Poles living in Prussia, especially in the province of Posen, were to be "encouraged" by unspecified means to move into the German-ruled puppet state of the Kingdom of Poland.

The German minority living in Congress Poland, which had earlier suggested the annexation of all territory up to Łódź in a letter to the German government, also supported such proposals. The German government developed and agreed to these plans in March 1918, and in April gained support in the Prussian House of Lords; the plans for this were debated and developed across a wide spectrum of political parties and interested groups such as political scientists, industrialists, and nationalist organisations like the Pan-German League.

Friedrich von Schwerin, head of administration in Frankfurt/Oder and chairman of the Settlement Commission, stated, "The German people, the greatest colonizing people on earth, have again been given a great colonizing task. The current world war provides the opportunity for Germany to resume in a resolute way its colonizing mission in the East". For administrators like Schwerin, the plan was to be accompanied by massive expulsion of Poles as in his words "new land can usually only be won at the expense of those who own the land". The German nobility in certain versions of the plan were to become the "colonial administration". The plan has been described by historian Hajo Holborn as the first instance in modern European history of planning the removal of whole populations as a solution to national conflicts.

By removing the Polish population, all resistance to Germanization of Polish territories would be bypassed.

== See also ==
- Expulsion of Poles by Germany
- Act of 5th November
