= 1920 Croatian Peasant Rebellion =

Date	4–12 September 1920
Location	Central parts of Croatia-Slavonia, Kingdom of Serbs, Croats and Slovenes
Result	Rebellion suppressed

Belligerents
Croatian peasants; Members of the Croatian People's Peasant Party	Army of the Kingdom of Serbs, Croats and Slovenes; Gendarmerie

Commanders and leaders
Filip Lakuš; Stjepan Uroić	

Casualties and losses
15 killed	10 killed

Areas affected by the 1920 Croatian Peasant Rebellion (overlaid on modern borders for reference)
1 Križ
2 Čazma
3 Dugo Selo
4 Sveti Ivan Zelina
5 Zlatar
6 Popovača
7 Kutina
8 Novska
9 Grubišno Polje
10 Garešnica
11 Bjelovar
12 Sisak
13 Lekenik

The 1920 Croatian Peasant Rebellion, which is also known as the Križ Republic (Croatian: Kriška republika) occurred from 4 to 12 September 1920 in the countryside north-west and west of Zagreb in the recently established Kingdom of Serbs, Croats and Slovenes. The rebellion, which centred around the town of Križ, was the result of predominantly economic grievances and resistance to conscription. The immediate cause of the revolt was a campaign by the Royal Yugoslav Army, which was tasked with maintenance of public order in the area after the end of World War I, to register and brand draft animals for military use.

The first armed clashes took place around the towns Garešnica and Grubišno Polje, and quickly spread to Križ. From there, the revolt spread north-west towards Zagreb, especially Dugo Selo, Kloštar Ivanić, and Sveti Ivan Zelina. Violence also spread south-east to the towns of Popovača and Kutina. Clashes were also reported around Bjelovar and Sisak. Rebelling peasants disarmed local gendarmerie garrisons, and took over municipal buildings in several towns and villages. Reinforcements sent by the military fought the peasants and restored government control over the area.

The events are described in a contemporaneous report by Ban of Croatia Matko Laginja, who reported economic grievances were the main cause of the revolt, but attributed at least some of the violence to the Croatian People's Peasant Party, which was led by Stjepan Radić. There is no evidence the party or Radić, who was in prison at the time, organised the rebellion but its members supported and participated in the revolt, and at least in some areas led it. Filip Lakuš was a vocal leader of the revolt in Križ. Association with the rebellion helped Radić's party gain popularity among Croats between the recently held local and parliamentary elections in the Kingdom of Serbs, Croats and Slovenes that was held later that year. The hitherto relatively minor party became the major Croatian political force of the interwar period.

== Background ==
In the final year of the World War I, desertions from the Austro-Hungarian Army became widespread among soldiers who were conscripted in the Kingdom of Croatia-Slavonia, one of lands comprising Austria-Hungary. The deserters, who were known as Green Cadres, relied on banditry and voluntary support of peasants rejecting state authority as unjust. As acts of opposition to military and civilian authorities, the Green Cadres and the bulk of the peasantry opposed military service and taxation.

Following Austria-Hungary's defeat and dissolution in 1918, the South Slavic-inhabited lands of the former empire organised themselves as the short-lived State of Slovenes, Croats and Serbs (SSCS), and became a part of the newly established Kingdom of Serbs, Croats and Slovenes. The new country was formed as a union centring around the pre-war Kingdom of Serbia. A decision on the unification was expedited because the SSCS National Council was increasingly fearful of unrest in the countryside, the Italian territorial claims set out in the Treaty of London and allegations the General of the Infantry Anton Lipošćak was plotting a pro-Habsburg coup. As the military units raised in the former Austro-Hungarian lands, which were deemed unreliable following the Lipošćak affair, were being disbanded, the National Council invited the Royal Serbian Army into the former Austro-Hungarian lands, where it was tasked with protecting public order.

In early 1919, in this task, the army was replaced by the newly established, armed gendarmerie. After proclamation of unification of the Kingdom of Serbs, Croats and Slovenes on 1 December 1918, the process of establishing an army for the kingdom began. This army consisted of the National Council's 15,000 troops and the 145,000-strong Royal Serbian Army, and a change of name and insignia in 1919. The Royal Serbian Army and the Army of the Kingdom of the Serbs, Croats and Slovenes were very similar in appearance because the new force kept its predecessor's uniforms, ranks, insignia, and use of Serbian language. The officer cadre was overwhelmingly Serbian. Legislation confirming the establishment and structure of the army would be passed in 1923.

Political opponents of the establishment of the new state in Croatia-Slavonia included the Croatian People's Peasant Party (HPSS), which had been relatively minor party before the war but rose in prominence, partly due to its advocacy of pacifism and later republicanism. The HPSS's rise in popularity coincided with an increase of violence in Croatia-Slavonia's countryside in late 1918 and early 1919, and the 1918 protest in Zagreb suppressed by force. After the party launched a petition in support of a "neutral Croatian peasant state" received more than 115,000 signatures in six weeks, rallies in its support were banned and its leader Stjepan Radić was arrested in March 1919 and imprisoned for almost a year.

The authorities accused the HPSS of undermining the state authority and supporting outlaws. The government considered the HPSS's anti-militarism equal to the Bolshevism and therefore particularly dangerous as it was associated with the soldiers returning from Russian captivity in 1919, and contemporary mutinies in Maribor, Varaždin, and Osijek. The HPSS sought to appeal to peasants because its leaders equated the Kingdom of Serbs, Croats and Slovenes with Austria-Hungary by saying both were only interested in levying taxes and conscripting peasants. By 1919, residents of the Croatian hinterland perceived the Serbian military as an occupying force. This perception was mostly due to resistance to conscription of soldiers sent to fight Albanians in the Yugoslav colonisation of Kosovo and arbitrary beatings by army and gendarmerie as extrajudicial punishment. Desertion became sufficiently common to cause a limited revival of the Green Cadres.

== Timeline ==
=== Branding campaign ===
In late August 1920, the army started a campaign to brand privately owned draft animals. It was designating those that were fit for military use and potential drafting, and identifying a supply of horses and wagons for use in military training. The campaign caused renewed violence in the countryside east of Zagreb but the unrest had roots in economic issues. While draft-animal registration had been familiar to Croatian peasants since the time of Austria-Hungary, branding was a novelty. There were concerns the animals would be physically harmed and that those that were branded as unfit for military service would lose their market value. The authorities ignored these concerns, allowing misinformation and rumours about their motivation for the campaign to spread.

Preparations for a revolt against the branding campaign started in late August with participation of the HPSS members. By August 27, local authorities south of Zagreb became aware of intentions to disrupt the branding campaign, and leaflets calling for resistance and promising aid from the Green Cadres appeared by the end of the month. There were rumours that "Serbs will come and take all the animals to Serbia" or France, and that animals would be branded with letters "K" and "A" to indicate they would be handed to the Karađorđevićs and regent Alexander, respectively. In some instances, army officers tasked with the branding campaign contributed to spreading of the rumours. In one recorded example, an army major threatened peasants in Ivanovo Selo who questioned the army's motives with deportation to Albania and the destruction of their village.

On 2 September, a crowd of peasants from surrounding villages gathered in Veliki Grđevac in Grubišno Polje district, about 80 kilometres (50 mi) east of Zagreb. Speakers urged the assembled peasants not to turn in their horses. In response, a Bjelovar-Križevci County clerk and the county secretary arrived, protected by gendarmes, to calm the crowd. This was repeated the next day, when armed crowd of peasants tried to interfere with the work of officials tasked with the branding of horses in nearby Garešnica and, according to a contemporaneous report prepared by Ban of Croatia Matko Laginja, two peasants were killed in the incident. The authorities ended the branding campaign on Laginja's urging on 4 September.

=== Clashes in Čazma and Križ ===
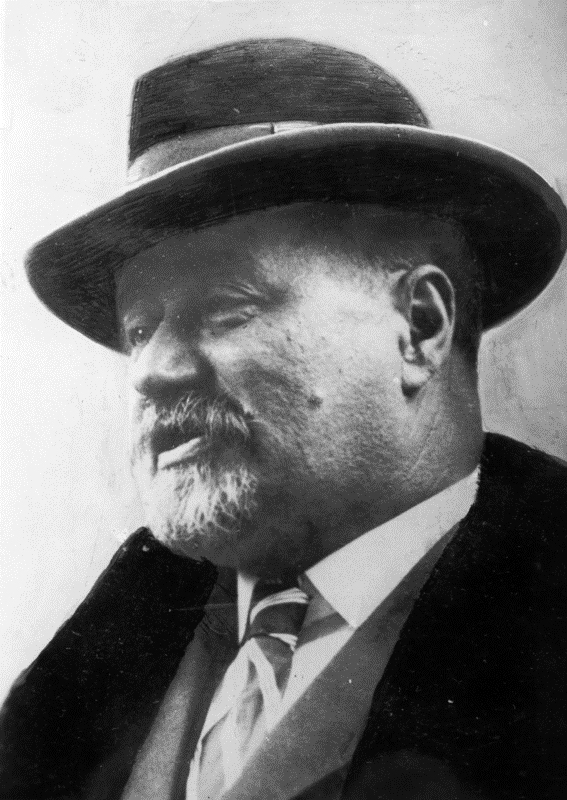
Rebel leader Filip Lakuš in Križ demanded declaration of a republic led by Stjepan Radić (pictured).

On 4 September, the crowd again gathered in Veliki Grđevac; they assaulted the 15 gendarmes accompanying the arriving county officials. According to Laginja's report, a peasant was killed and several were wounded in the clash before gendarmes led by Captain Janko Milčić scattered and ran away. Milčić discarded his uniform and fled to Bjelovar, 20 km (12 mi) away. Further clashes took place the same day in the village of Rača near Bjelovar; a municipal government building was seized and records burnt, and in Ivanska, two peasants were killed when a 300-strong crowd clashed with gendarmes. On the same day, peasants took control of the town of Čazma, about 50 km (31 mi) east of Zagreb. According to Laginja, a crowd of about 400 confronted nine gendarmes in the town, forcing them to flee and hide; following this, the peasants proceeded to take weapons found in the district and municipal buildings. In response, the following day, the army deployed a company from Zagreb with a machine gun. The reinforcements restored government control of Čazma after an armed clash resulting in fatalities on 8 September.

On 5 September, about 15 km (9.3 mi) south of Čazma, an armed crowd seized the gendarmerie station in Križ and it became the centre of the rebellion. The rebels took arms found there, cut down telegraph and telephone poles, and captured the railway station in nearby village of Novoselec. During the following two days, the rebels took all firearms they could find in Križ, broke into municipal government buildings, and burnt pictures of King Peter I and regent Alexander found in offices. On 7 September, a train taking army reinforcements from Zagreb to Kutina was stopped in Novoselec station, and a skirmish between the rebels and the soldiers resulted in fatalities on both sides. Peasants commandeered the train with the aim of using it to help spread the uprising to nearby towns. Peasant guards were set up to patrol key areas, and local HPSS members set up and staffed "people's courts". Further clashes took place on 5 September in the villages of Severin and Velika Pisanica near Bjelovar. The same day, the army and the gendarmerie deployed reinforcements in villages of Farkaševac and Trojstvo to the west and north of Bjelovar to intercept rumoured assistance from across the nearby Hungarian border. The rebellion, which ended by 9 September in the Križ area, is also referred to as the Križ Republic (Croatian: Križka republika).

=== Clashes in Dugo Selo and Sveti Ivan Zelina ===
On 6 September, unrest spread towards Zagreb. A crowd of about 600 peasants attacked a gendarmerie in the village of Oborovo before proceeding to Dugo Selo, about 10 km (6.2 mi) east of Zagreb, through the villages of Bregi and Ježevo. Shots were exchanged with a group of gendarmes in Dugo Selo, resulting in fatalities on both sides. The peasants kept control of Dugo Selo for several hours before the authorities regained control of the town. On 7 September, a gendarmerie station in Kloštar Ivanić, equidistant between Dugo Selo and Križ, was attacked and captured. Two customs officials were killed in the fighting and the municipal notary was assaulted. The army retook the town on 9 September.

Also on 6 September, in the village of Psarjevo near Sveti Ivan Zelina, about 15 km (9.3 mi) north of Dugo Selo, another group of peasants fought three gendarmes. In the morning of 7 September, crowds of peasant moved to Sveti Ivan Zelina, where shots were exchanged with local gendarmerie. Telephone and telegraph lines in the area were cut, municipal and district administration and courts, shops and taverns were looted, prompting the army to dispatch reinforcements by train from Zagreb to nearby Sesvete before moving on foot towards Sveti Ivan Zelina and arriving the following morning. While the skirmishes were taking place in Dugo Selo and Sveti Ivan Zelina, a crowd of 2,000 looted and torched local administration offices in the villages of Belovar and Moravče, which are located between Sesvete and Sveti Ivan Zelina. In nearby Kašina, a municipal administration building was looted and municipal clerks were assaulted.

On 8 September, crowds of peasants moved from Kašina to the village of Marija Bistrica about 15 km (9.3 mi) away. The municipal administration buildings and gendarmerie station in the village were looted and records were torched. Local gendarmes were disarmed before additional 20 gendarmes sent by car from Zagreb could reach the village and restore control. At least one peasant was killed in the fighting. Further reinforcements were sent from Zagreb to Donja Stubica and Zlatar. A local garrison of seven gendarmes and several armed citizens guarded Zlatar against peasant advances from the villages of Ladislavec and Mače until the reinforcements arrived in the morning.

=== Clashes in Popovača and Kutina ===
In the evening of 7 September, the gendarmerie reported the HPSS-led crowd had disarmed its station in Popovača, approximately 12 km (7.5 mi) south-east of Križ. The report indicated the crowd might move further south-east to nearby Kutina and asked for reinforcements from Zagreb. In response, 30 gendarmes were dispatched by train from Sisak via Novska to Banova Jaruga, about 10 km (6.2 mi) south-east from Kutina. At Kutina, the gendarmes linked up with another 30 who had already been deployed in the area from Slavonski Brod to provide security along the Zagreb–Slavonski Brod railway line. The combined force reached Kutina on 8 September in time to meet rebellious crowds moving into the city. There were several fatalities in the ensuing shooting but the gendarmes kept control of the town.

Clashes also took place in villages near Sisak, where rumours peasants would come from all over Croatia to help an attack on Zagreb to rescue Radić from prison were being spread. On 8 September, in Gušće and Topolovac, gendarmerie stations and municipal administration buildings were seized and municipal clerks were chased away. In the evening of 9 September, the Sisak–Zagreb railway was damaged and telegraph poles around the village of Sela were cut. Rebels fired upon workers sent to repair the railway. The force attacking the repairmen was between 150 and 1,000 strong, depending on the source, and was armed with at least one machine gun. In response, the army deployed a company of 78 soldiers from Zagreb to pacify the area. After the reinforcements suffered casualties, another infantry company and a battery of cannon were sent from Zagreb. The artillery was not used. On 10 September, skirmishes took place in the nearby villages of Letovanić and Cerje, and several peasants were killed in fighting there. Destruction of the railway was motivated by rumours the imprisoned Radić would be transferred by train from Zagreb to Belgrade. An army unit deployed to Lekenik to guard the nearby railway junction was attacked on the following two days before the army regained Letovanić on 12 September.

== Aftermath ==
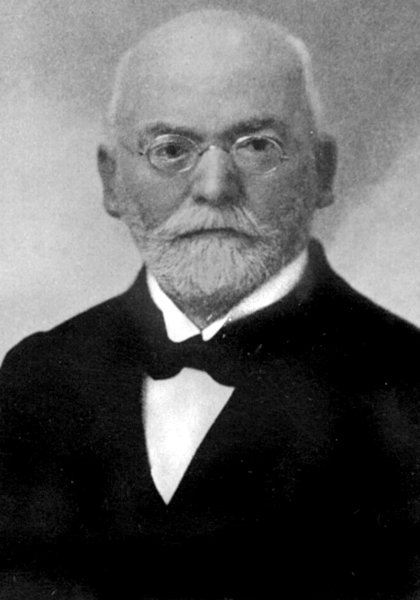
Ban of Croatia Matko Laginja compiled the most comprehensive report on the rebellion.

By 10 September 1920, the rebellion was largely ended. Fighting continued for two more days near Sisak, especially around Letovanić. The rebel peasants dispersed into woodlands around Letovanić, where they remained active at least until 14 September, when rail service to Zagreb had to be suspended while the army again intervened against the rebels. According to official statistics, fifteen peasants were killed, although the figure is likely underestimated. Ten other deaths were listed by the authorities: three soldiers, two gendarmes, three civil servants and two financial guards. In the aftermath of the rebellion, there were large-scale arrests, hostage-taking, and plundering of rebellious villages by the army. Beatings of peasants also became commonplace, and there was at least one killing reported in Novoselci, where an elderly man disobeyed or did not hear a soldier's order to squat.

Laginja submitted his report as a confidential document to the interior minister Milorad Drašković on 27 September and it remains the most detailed account of the events. In his report, Laginja said general discontent caused the rebellion, specifically the newly regulated, unfavourable rate of exchange of the Austro-Hungarian krone to dinar, recruitment of conscripts including World War I veterans, hostage-taking of families of army deserters, and reneging on the promise to deregulate tobacco planting and liquor distillation. The report also noted individual supporters of the HPSS had encouraged and led the rebels. In his report, Laginja mentioned several HPSS members leading or speaking to the peasant insurgents. Those include future party leader Juraj Krnjević's speech in Ivanić-Grad but Laginja noted he did not know the objective of the speech, except that he was told Krnjević appealed for calm. According to Laginja, two particularly active peasant leaders in the Križ area were HPSS members Filip Lakuš, who called for the establishment of a republic with Radić as its head, and Stjepan Uroić. The HPSS encouraged the revolt but there is no information on participation of party leadership in its planning or execution. The HPSS's messengers played a major role in spreading information about the events; prominent at a local level were arrested among rebellious peasants, and the area where the rebellion occurred is where the HPSS was most active at the time.

Because the authorities did not draw much distinction between the HPSS's rejection of centralised authority and Bolshevism, the government downplayed peasant grievances and generally blamed Bolshevik influence in the countryside. Even though in 1924, Radić's nephew Pavle Radić said the party did not start the rebellion, in the aftermath, the HPSS backed Lakuš and Uroić as party candidates for office. Two months after the rebellion, the HPSS took part in the 1920 Kingdom of Serbs, Croats and Slovenes Constitutional Assembly election, in which the HPSS replaced the Croatian Party of Rights as the perceived champions of the Croatian national cause; Radić and the HPSS achieved the best election result among Croatian parties. The HPSS achieved a significant improvement in its electoral results compared to the local elections held earlier the same year. For example, in the local elections held shortly before the rebellion, the HPSS won six percent of seats in municipal assemblies in Virovitica County, two percent in Požega County, and no seats in Syrmia County in the region of Slavonia, not a traditional party stronghold. Later that year, in the parliamentary elections held shortly after the rebellion, the HPSS won 56 percent of parliamentary mandates available for Požega County, 38 percent of the mandates in Virovitica County and 21 percent in Syrmia County. The electoral success was the result of the HPSS having demonstrated it identified with the peasants' problems in a predominantly rural country, including identification of the HPSS with the 1920 peasant rebellion.

== Sources ==
- Banac, Ivo (1984). The National Question in Yugoslavia: Origins, History, Politics. Ithaca, New York: Cornell University Press. ISBN 0-8014-1675-2.
- Banac, Ivo (1992). "'Emperor Karl Has Become a Comitadji': The Croatian Disturbances of Autumn 1918". The Slavonic and East European Review. 70 (2). London: Modern Humanities Research Association: 284–305. ISSN 0037-6795. JSTOR 4210927.
- Beneš, Jakub S. (2017). "The Green Cadres and the Collapse of Austria-Hungary in 1918". Past & Present (236). Oxford: Oxford University Press: 207–241. doi:10.1093/pastj/gtx028. ISSN 0031-2746.
- Grgić, Stipica (2021). "Društveno-političke prilike u ivanićkom kraju između dva svjetska rata" [Socio-political Environment of the Ivanić Area in the Interwar Period]. Pilar: časopis za društvene i humanističke studije (in Croatian). 31 (1). Zagreb: Social Sciences Institute Ivo Pilar: 11–51. doi:10.5559/pi.16.31.01. ISSN 1846-3010. S2CID 247265866.
- Janjatović, Bosiljka (1992). "Izvještaj bana Matka Laginje o pobuni seljaka u sjeverozapadnoj Hrvatskoj u rujnu 1920. godine" [Ban Matko Laginja's Report About Peasant Uprising in Northwestern Croatia in September 1920]. Časopis za suvremenu povijest (in Croatian). 24 (1). Zagreb: Croatian Institute of History: 257–292. ISSN 0590-9597.
- Janjatović, Bosiljka (1993). "Represija spram hrvatskih seljaka 1918. – 1921" [Repression Against Croatian Peasants from 1918 to 1921]. Časopis za suvremenu povijest (in Croatian). 25 (1). Zagreb: Croatian Institute of History: 25–42. ISSN 0590-9597.
- Jović, Dragiša (2000). "Hrvatska zajednica u političkom životu Slavonije, Srijema i Baranje 1919.–1920. godine" [Croatian Union (Hrvatska zajednica) in the Political Life of Slavonija, Srijem and Baranja 1919–1920]. Časopis za suvremenu povijest (in Croatian). 32 (2). Zagreb: Croatian Institute of History: 235–255. ISSN 0590-9597.
- Newman, John Paul (2010). "Post-imperial and Post-war Violence in the South Slav Lands, 1917-1923". Contemporary European History. 19 (3). Cambridge: Cambridge University Press: 249–265. doi:10.1017/S0960777310000159. ISSN 0960-7773. JSTOR 20749812. S2CID 62795053.
- Newman, John Paul (2014). "Serbian and Habsburg Military institutional legacies in Yugoslavia after 1918". First World War Studies. 5 (3). Abingdon-on-Thames: Taylor & Francis: 319–335. doi:10.1080/19475020.2014.1001519. ISSN 1947-5020. S2CID 73611212.
- Ramet, Sabrina P. (2006). The Three Yugoslavias: State-Building and Legitimation, 1918–2005. Bloomington: Indiana University Press. ISBN 978-0-253-34656-8.
- Vuković, Saša (2021). "Gornjostubički "slučaj Ciglar i Žukina" u kontekstu seljačke pobune zbog žigosanja stoke 1920. godine" [The Gornja Stubica "Ciglar and Žukina Case" in the Context of the Peasant Rebellion Against Cattle Branding in 1920]. KAJ: Literature, Art and Culture Periodical (in Croatian). 54 (1–2). Zagreb, Croatia: Kajkavian Parliament - Association for Promotion of Science and Arts: 79–90. doi:10.32004/k.54.1-2.3. ISSN 0453-1116. S2CID 248710393.
- Zorko, Tomislav (2003). "Afera Lipošćak" [The Lipošćak Affair]. Časopis za suvremenu povijest (in Croatian). 35 (3). Zagreb: Croatian Institute of History: 887–902. ISSN 0590-9597.
