= Naftalan =

Naftalan may refer to:

- Naftalan, Azerbaijan, a city in central Azerbaijan
- Naftalan oil, a special crude oil found in the Azerbaijani city
- Naftalan (Croatia), a hospital and spa center located near Ivanić-Grad, Croatia

== See also ==
- Naphthalene, a chemical compound
