= Croatian Path =

Political party

Hrvatski put – platforma nezavisnih
- Leader: Dario Zurovec
- Founder: Dario Zurovec
- Founded: 12 September 2026
- Ideology: Economic patriotism (self-described)

Hrvatski put – platforma nezavisnih (lit. 'Croatian Path – Platform of Independents') is a political party in Croatia founded on 12 September 2026 by Dario Zurovec. Zurovec, mayor of Sveta Nedelja, and its only member of the Croatian Parliament, brought his independent electoral list with various others from Zagreb County to form the party. Other founding members include the mayors of Dugo Selo Nenad Panian, and Križ's Marko Magdić, Matija Teur's independent list from Zaprešić, and independent lists from Ivanić-Grad and Jastrebarsko. Thus, their focus is on Zagreb region politicians. Formal registration is expected to happen soon. Nenad Panian is the vice president.

== Ideology ==
The party's main stance is "economic patriotism", particularly domestic economic development. The party is ideologically closer with the Croatian Democratic Union, but is open to conciliation with the moderate left.
