= Greda =

Greda can refer to several places:

== Bosnia and Herzegovina ==
- Greda, Bosanska Gradiška, a village near Gradiška
- Greda, Ljubuški, a village near Ljubuški
- Greda, Šipovo, a village near Šipovo
- Bukova Greda, a village near Orašje

== Croatia ==
- Greda, Sisak-Moslavina County, a village near Sisak
- Greda, Varaždin County, a village near Maruševec
- Greda, Zagreb County, a village near Vrbovec
- Babina Greda, a village and municipality in the Vukovar-Srijem County
- Blinjska Greda, a village near Sunja
- Donja Greda, a village near Rugvica
- Gabajeva Greda, a village near Hlebine
- Gornja Greda, a village near Brckovljani
- Greda Breška, a village near Ivanić-Grad
- Greda Sunjska, a village near Sunja
- Hrastova Greda, a village near Kalinovac
- Sopjanska Greda, a village near Sopje
- Visoka Greda, a village near Vrbje
- Zlatna Greda, a village near Bilje

== See also ==
- Molve Grede, a village near Molve
- Grenda (disambiguation)
