= Tarno =

Tarno may refer to:

== Places ==
- Tärnö, an island in Sweden
- Tarno, Croatia, a village near Ivanić-Grad, Croatia

== People ==
- Ricardo Tarno (born 1966), Spanish politician
- Ülo Tärno (born 1936), Estonian politician
