= Naftalan oil =

Crude oil from Naftalan, Azerbaijan

Naftalan or Naphtalan is a type of crude oil. It is named after Naftalan, Azerbaijan, where it is found. It is known for its use in alternative medicine.

Naftalan crude oil is too heavy for normal export uses (unlike Azerbaijan's plentiful Caspian Sea oil): it contains about 50 percent cycloalkanes (naphthenic hydrocarbons).

In Azerbaijan, people using the oil generally sit in a bath and are covered in oil up to their necks. There are numerous petroleum spas in the city of Naftalan itself. As a result, it has become a destination for health tourism.

== History ==
Naftalan oil has been used since antiquity and was noted by Marco Polo. Its chemistry has been studied from the 1870s. Treatment centres were established in Azerbaijan and were visited by people from the Soviet Union. Its therapeutic effects have been studied since the 1890s.

After the oil boom at the turn of the 20th century, the Baku naftalan started to be extracted in higher volumes, and exported to Germany. After the borders were closed following the 1917 Russian Revolution, it fell into oblivion in the West. It still attracted some attention in the Soviet Union, when the Azerbaijan Medical University opened a small health resort that was in full operation by 1936. In the 1930s, academician T. G. Pashayev started to try to isolate naphthalan from industrial paraffin and naphthenic oils and proposed the term, though more current research indicates that the term "earth mineral oil" is more appropriate for what he described in his paper published in Moscow in 1959.

During the 20th century, a large number of academic papers were published by Soviet researchers about the topic. Nevertheless, in Europe the results from the Naphthalan Health Resort in Azerbaijan were largely rejected because the idea of the application of native oil to human subjects was not acceptable.

In the 1970s, the School of Medicine, University of Zagreb conducted its own research to compare the kinds of oil found near Baku and near Križ, Croatia. After two years, in 1978, they concluded that the oil they analyzed was not carcinogenic, after testing at INA labs and at the Ruđer Bošković Institute, and conducting a trial with 770 patients. In 1989 the Naftalan Special Hospital for Medical Rehabilitation was founded in Ivanić Grad. Their use of naphtalan oil is restricted to a refined distillate, devoid of tar, aromatic content and other undesired substances, in an effort to minimize the rate of contraindications and side effects. This hospital later conducted a 10-year follow-up and observation of 10,000 of their patients and respective associated data, and reportedly observed a number of therapeutic effects.

As recently as 2006, the New York Times published an article referring to naftalan as mostly naphthalene, which would be carcinogenic to humans. In 2009, The Independent described one of the spas, repeating the claim about the composition of the oil.

== Composition of the oil ==
Naftalan oil is a type of heavy crude oil, a dense and viscous mixture with components including aromatics, naphthenes, asphaltenes and resins. In particular it contains naphthenic acids, an oil industry term for a group of carboxylic acids which can be up to 3 percent of the oil by weight. Purified oil used in some treatments contains mainly polycyclic hydrocarbons, with the most pure having a transparent white to lemon-yellow color and naphthenic content up to 98.5 percent.

Early studies of the oil's chemistry and therapeutic properties involved partially purified material, a naptha used as an ointment which was compared favourably to Vaseline. It was applied to wounds and burns.

== Uses ==
Qarabağ spa and resort

Spas in Naftalan, Azerbaijan use the crude oil for whole-body bathing, a procedure which has been described by the British documentary photographer Chloe Dewe Mathews. A typical single bathing session lasts ten minutes. Health tourism is now a major industry in Azerbaijan.

The purified oil, which is a mixture of cycloalkanes, is used in combination with mineral waters for balneotherapy.

The concept of using heavy crude oil in spa treatments has led to a Canadian proposal to create a "bitumen spa" on the same principles as the Naftalan ones.

== See also ==
- Coal tar

== Sources ==
- Vržogić P, Ostrogović Ž, Alajbeg A (2003). "Naphthalan – A natural medicinal product". Acta Dermatovenerologica Croatica. 11 (3). Department of Dermatology and Venereology, University Hospital Centre Zagreb: 178–184. PMID 12967511.
