= Topole =

Topole may refer to:

- Topole, Pomeranian Voivodeship, a village in the administrative district of Gmina Chojnice, Chojnice County, Poland
- Topole, Rogaška Slatina, a settlement in the Municipality of Rogaška Slatina in eastern Slovenia
- Topole, Mengeš, a settlement in the Municipality of Mengeš in the Upper Carniola region of Slovenia

== See also ==
- Topolje (disambiguation)
- Topol (disambiguation)
