= Topolje =

Topolje may refer to:

- Topolje, Slovenia, a village near Železniki
- Topolje, Osijek-Baranja County, a village near Draž in Croatian Baranja
- Topolje, Zagreb County, a village near Ivanić-Grad, Croatia
