= Zelina Breška =

- Settlement
- Location within Croatia
- Coordinates: 45.69°N 16.4°E
- Country: Croatia
- County: Zagreb
- Town: Ivanić-Grad

Area
  - Total: 1.9 km^{2} (0.73 sq mi)

Population (2021)
  - Total: 76
  - Density: 40/km^{2} (100/sq mi)
- Time zone: UTC+1 (CET)
  - Summer (DST): UTC+2 (CEST)

Zelina Breška is a settlement in the Ivanić-Grad town of Zagreb County, Croatia. As of 2011 it had a population of 99 people.
