= Trebovec =

Coordinates: 45°43′N 16°19′E

- Settlement
- Location within Croatia
- Country: Croatia
- County: Zagreb
- Town: Ivanić-Grad

Area
  - Total: 14.7 km^{2} (5.7 sq mi)

Population (2021)
  - Total: 323
  - Density: 22.0/km^{2} (56.9/sq mi)
- Time zone: UTC+1 (CET)
  - Summer (DST): UTC+2 (CEST)

Trebovec is a settlement in the Ivanić-Grad town of Zagreb County, Croatia. As of 2011 it had a population of 347 people.
