= Grenda (surname) =

Grenda is a Polish surname. According to the Dictionary of American Family Names, it is a variant of the Polish surname Grzęda, meaning "perch", "roost", or "patch of land".

Notable people with the surname include:

- Alfred Grenda (1889–1977), Australian cyclist
- Ivana Švarc-Grenda (born 1970), Croatian pianist
- Jolanta Sobierańska-Grenda (born 1973), Polish politician
- Michael Grenda (born 1962), Australian cyclist
- Stephen Grenda (1910–1971), American football coach

== See also ==
- Grenda, fictional character from animated TV series Gravity Falls
- Grenda (disambiguation)
