= Prerovec =

Coordinates: 45°39′N 16°18′E

- Settlement
- Location within Croatia
- Country: Croatia
- County: Zagreb
- Town: Ivanić-Grad

Area
  - Total: 4.5 km^{2} (1.7 sq mi)

Population (2021)
  - Total: 105
  - Density: 23/km^{2} (60/sq mi)
- Time zone: UTC+1 (CET)
  - Summer (DST): UTC+2 (CEST)

Prerovec is a settlement in the Ivanić-Grad town of Zagreb County, Croatia. As of 2011 it had a population of 98 people.
