= Derežani =

Coordinates: 45°42′N 16°28′E

- Settlement
- Location within Croatia
- Country: Croatia
- County: Zagreb
- Town: Ivanić-Grad

Area
  - Total: 5.3 km^{2} (2.0 sq mi)

Population (2021)
  - Total: 214
  - Density: 40/km^{2} (100/sq mi)
- Time zone: UTC+1 (CET)
  - Summer (DST): UTC+2 (CEST)

Derežani is a settlement in the Ivanić-Grad town of Zagreb County, Croatia. As of 2011 it had a population of 379 people.
