= Deanovec =

Coordinates: 45°42′N 16°29′E

- Settlement
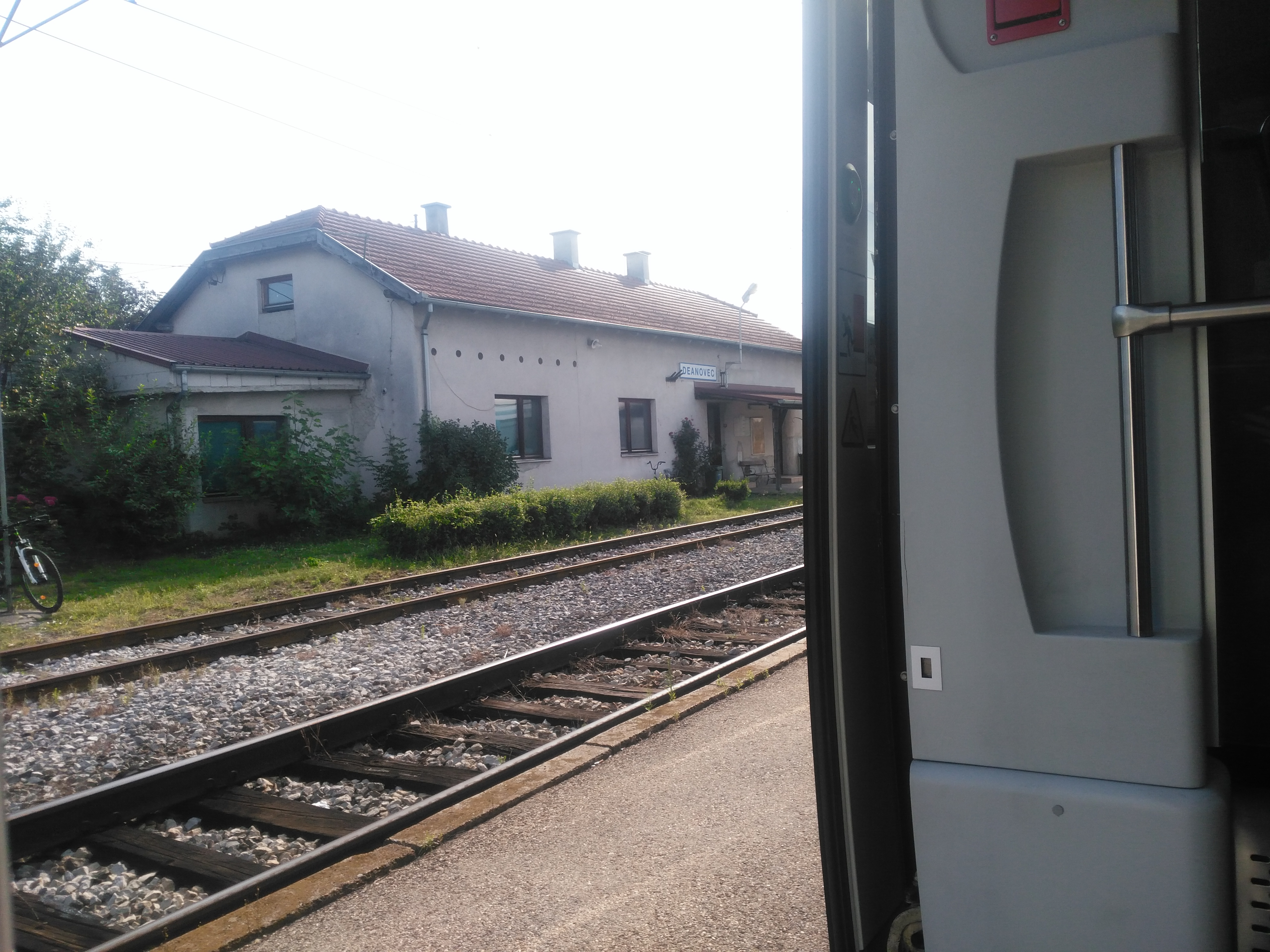

- Location within Croatia
- Country: Croatia
- County: Zagreb
- Town: Ivanić-Grad

Area
  - Total: 6.7 km^{2} (2.6 sq mi)

Population (2021)
  - Total: 503
  - Density: 75/km^{2} (190/sq mi)
- Time zone: UTC+1 (CET)
  - Summer (DST): UTC+2 (CEST)

Deanovec is a settlement in the Ivanić-Grad town of Zagreb County, Croatia. As of 2011 it had a population of 536 people.
