= Opatinec =

Coordinates: 45°43′N 16°23′E

- Settlement
- Location within Croatia
- Country: Croatia
- County: Zagreb
- Town: Ivanić-Grad

Area
  - Total: 2.9 km^{2} (1.1 sq mi)

Population (2021)
  - Total: 453
  - Density: 160/km^{2} (400/sq mi)
- Time zone: UTC+1 (CET)
  - Summer (DST): UTC+2 (CEST)

Opatinec is a settlement in the Ivanić-Grad town of Zagreb County, Croatia. As of 2011 it had a population of 453 people.
