= Obedišće =

Coordinates: 45°38′03″N 16°32′53″E

- Interactive map of Obedišće

Obedišće is a village in the municipality of Križ, Zagreb County, Croatia. In the 2011 census, it had 580 inhabitants.
