= Josip Lang =

Croatian Catholic bishop (1857–1924)

Venerable Josip Lang
- Born: 25 January 1857; Lepšić, Kingdom of Croatia
- Residence: Kaptol, Zagreb
- Died: 1 November 1924 (aged 67); Zagreb, Kingdom of Serbs, Croats, and Slovenes

Josip Lang (25 January 1857 – 1 November 1924) was titular bishop of Alabanda, and auxiliary bishop of the Archdiocese of Zagreb (both since 1915). He is widely known for his charitable work, which earned him the title "friend of the poor". By a decree of Pope Francis issued on 25 November 2024, he is considered as venerable.

== Biography ==
=== Early life and education ===
Lang was born in 1857 in Lepšić near Ivanić-Grad in a devout Catholic family of father Dragutin Cof, miller and mother Maria Cof, baker. Josip was devout from an early age. He actively participated in his parish life, often withdrawing to pray in silence. With the death of his father at the age of 38, the family experienced financial difficulties. His mother asked Cardinal Josip Mihalović to accept him into the archdiocesan orphanage, where his prayer intensified and his priestly vocation matured. From 1875 to 1877, he attended the seminary, where he distinguished himself with his ascetic life. The cardinal decided to send him to Rome to continue his theological studies. He stayed at the Germanicum, and studied philosophy and theology between 1877 and 1883 at the Gregoriana, earning doctorate in philosophy in 1880.

=== Pre-episcopal service ===
Upon his return to Zagreb, he was ordained a priest on 16 September 1883. He served as a chaplain in Zlatar (1883–84), spiritual leader (Croatian: duhovnik) and confessor at the Sisters of Charity Hospital (1884), schoolteacher of pedagogy and Italian at the Women's Teachers' School of the Sisters of Charity (1885–1900), spiritual leader (1900–08) and rector (1908–12) of the theological seminary in Zagreb and parson of the cathedral parish of St. Mary's at Dolac (1912–14). In 1898, he fell ill with pneumonia and pleurisy. He was the president-rapporteur of the Zagreb Curia, and also worked in the marriage court. When the Hungarian authorities resigned and retired some professors at the University of Zagreb, a rebellion broke out among the students, which also included seminarians, as the Faculty of Theology was part of the university. Due to the participation of the seminarians in the rebellion without the knowledge of their superiors, the senior priests of the seminary demanded Lang's resignation, which he accepted and left the seminary. He was appointed in 1898 as a member of the Archdiocese's Spiritual Committee (Nadbiskupski duhovni stol), in 1908 as a canon of the Zagreb Cathedral, in 1911 as an archdeacon of Varaždin, and in 1912 as an apostolic protonotary.

=== Episcopate ===
In 1914, Lang was appointed as a procurator general to archbishop Antun Bauer, who then asked emperor Franz Joseph and the Holy See to appoint Lang for his auxiliary bishop. Bauer consercrated him as auxiliary bishop of Zagreb on 26 February 1915. Soon after, on 18 April 1915 he was ordained as titular bishop of Alabanda.

Lang encouraged charitable work during World War I and the aftermath, helping especially widows and orphans.

=== Last years ===
From 1923 onwards, his health steadily deteriorated, and in 1924 he suffered a heart attack that left him hospitalized. His health continued to deteriorate until his death.

== Writings ==
His prayerbook Slava Presvetoj Krvi Isusovoj ('Glory to the Most Precious Blood of Jesus') had several editions. He wrote for periodicals Katolički učitelj ('Catholic Teacher'), Katolički list ('Catholic Paper'), Kršćanska škola ('Christian School'), Vrhbosna, Kalendar Srca Isusova ('Heart of Jesus Calendar') and Sacerdos Christi.

- Srednja škola bez religije. Hrvatski katolički narodni savez. Zagreb. 1919.
- Slava Presvetoj Krvi Isusovoj. Narodna prosvjeta. Zagreb. 1922. (^{2}1924, ^{3}1929^{†}, ^{4}1933^{†}, ^{5}1968^{†})
  - Slava presvetoj krvi Isusovoj: promatranja o Predragocijenoj krvi i vjenčić molitava. U pravi trenutak. Zagreb. 2019^{†}. ISBN 978-9-53744-641-3 (updated edition)
- Život i rad msgr. dra Matije Stepinca, apošt. protonotara i kanonika štioca. Župa sv. Petra. Zagreb. 2004^{†}. ISBN 953-981-502-9.

Translations from Italian:

- Život svetog Alojzija Gonzage, uzora i zaštitnika kršćanske mladeži (orig. Vita di san Luigi Gonzaga della Compagnia di Gesù by Virgilio Cepari). Scholz i Kralj. Zagreb. 1891.
- Slava Marijina ili Majka Božja od Milosrđa (orig. Le glorie di Maria by Alphonsus Maria de Liguori). Narodna prosvjeta. Zagreb. 1925.^{†}
- Zdravo Kraljice (orig. Salve Regina by Alphonsus Maria de Liguori). Apostolatski centar Sav Tvoj. Zagreb. 2004.^{†}

== Canonization process ==
The reputation for holiness that he enjoyed during his lifetime continued after his death, so much so that the archbishop Alojzije Stepinac wanted to initiate the process of beatification.

In 1971, the journal of the postulancy, the Vjesnik biskupa Langa ('Bishop Lang's Herald'), was launched.

Visiting the Zagreb Cathedral in 1994, seventy years after his death, Pope John Paul II remembered Josip Lang, listing him among those "in a long line of men and women who have distinguished themselves in our time by living Christian virtues".

On November 25, 2024, Pope Francis authorized Marcello Semeraro, Prefect of the Dicastery for the Causes of Saints, to promulgate a decree confirming "the heroic virtues of the Servant of God Joseph Lang, Titular Bishop of Alabanda and Auxiliary Bishop of Zagreb".

== Legacy ==
In 2002, the Bishop Josip Lang Foundation for the Elderly, Sick and Abandoned was established in Zagreb. The foundation was founded by the Zagreb Jesuits at the request of Father Antun Cvek, who himself has cared for the elderly, sick and abandoned for over 35 years. The foundation provides material, psychological and spiritual assistance to the elderly, sick, disabled, abandoned and traumatized. Foundation members visit sick and disabled people in retirement homes in Zagreb. The foundation has also held seminars for veterans of the Croatian War of Independence who are struggling with post-traumatic stress disorder (PTSD).

On the centenary of his death in November 2024, a monument was unveiled in the city park in Ivanić-Grad in front of the parish church of St. Peter the Apostle. The Holy Mass and blessing of the monument was led by the bishop of Sisak, Vlado Košić.

== Sources ==
Literature

- Barić, Joško (2013). "LANG, Josip". Croatian Biographical Lexicon (in Croatian). Zagreb: Miroslav Krleža Institute of Lexicography.
- Antun Cvek; Maja Cvitanović, eds. (2005). Biskup Josip Lang - prijatelj siromaha: zbornik sa Simpozija održanoga 6. studenoga 2004. u Zagrebu, prigodom 80. godišnjice smrti biskupa Josipa Langa [Bishop Josip Lang - Friend of the Poor: Proceedings of the Symposium held on November 6, 2004 in Zagreb, on the occasion of the 80th anniversary of the death of Bishop Josip Lang]. Zagreb: Zaklada biskup Josip Lang. ISBN 953998324X.
- "Lang, Josip (1857-1924), Bischof". Österreichisches Biographisches Lexikon 1815-1950 (in German). Vol. 4. Austrian Centre for Digital Humanities and Cultural Heritage. 1969. p. 442. doi:10.1553/0x00282c27.

Web

- "Životopis Časnog sluge Božjeg Josipa Langa (1857. - 1924.)" [Biography of the Venerable Josip Lang (1857-1924)] (in Croatian). Archdiocese of Zagreb. 26 November 2024.
- "Proglašenje dekreta o življenim krepostima časnog sluge Božjega Josipa Langa" [Proclamation of the decree on the lived virtues of the venerable servant of God Josip Lang] (in Croatian). Archdiocese of Zagreb. 25 November 2024.
- "Bishop Josip Lang †". Catholic-Hierarchy.org.
- "U Ivanić-Gradu otkriven spomenik slugi Božjem biskupu Josipu Langu" [Monument to Servant of God Bishop Josip Lang unveiled in Ivanić-Grad]. ika.hkm.hr (in Croatian). Informativna katolička agencija. 17 November 2024.
- "Osnivanje Zaklade "Biskup Josip Lang" za stare, bolesne i nemoćne osobe" [Establishment of the "Bishop Josip Lang" Foundation for the Elderly, Sick and Disabled]. zbjl.hr (in Croatian). Zaklada Biskup Josip Lang. 2023.
