= Grenda =

Grenda may refer to:

- Grenda (surname), people with the name
- Grenda Corporation, an Australian bus company
  - Grenda's Bus Services, a subsidiary of Grenda Corporation
- Grenda (newspaper), a Norwegian newspaper

== See also ==
- Greda (disambiguation)
- Grenada
