= Bunjani =

- Village
- Location within Croatia
- Coordinates: 45.696848°N 16.494638°E
- Country: Croatia
- County: Zagreb County
- Municipality: Križ

Area
  - Total: 7.1 km^{2} (2.7 sq mi)

Population (2021)
  - Total: 581
  - Density: 82/km^{2} (210/sq mi)
- Time zone: UTC+1 (CET)
  - Summer (DST): UTC+2 (CEST)

Bunjani is a village in Croatia.
