= Lipošćak affair =

Alleged coup d'état conspiracy in the State of Slovenes, Croats and Serbs in 1918

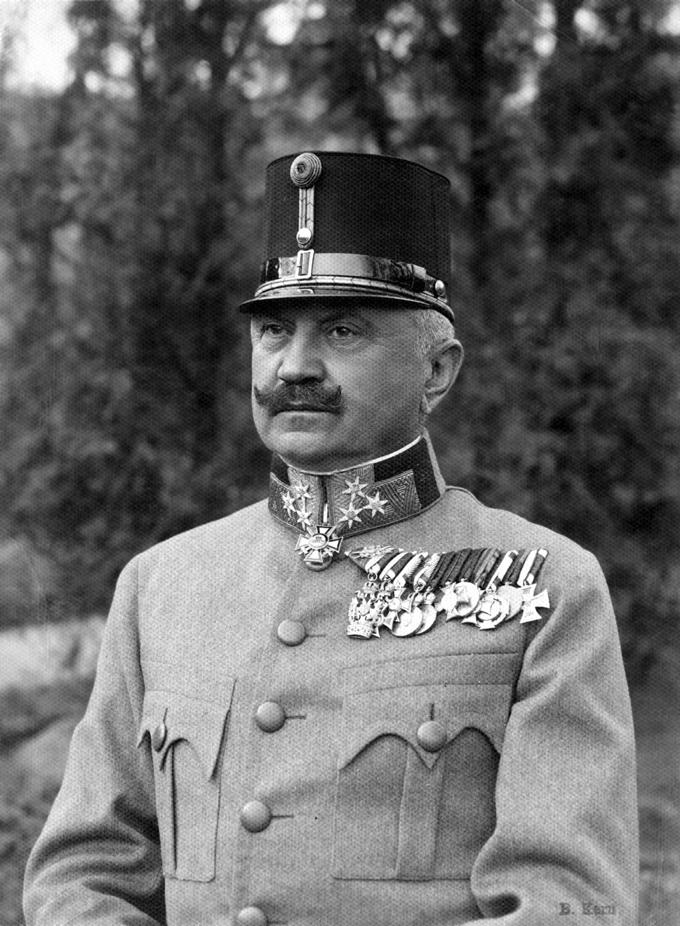
Anton Lipošćak was arrested on charges of treason on 22 November 1918.

The Lipošćak affair (Croatian: Afera Lipošćak) was an alleged conspiracy led by Anton Lipošćak, (Note: In early reports of the plot and historiography relying on those sources, Lipošćak's surname is erroneously reported as "Lipovšćak".) formerly a General of the Infantry in the Austro-Hungarian Army, to seize power in the recently proclaimed State of Slovenes, Croats and Serbs at the end of the First World War. The majority view of the allegations is that they were fabricated by allies of the Croat-Serb Coalition leader Svetozar Pribićević. Lipošćak was arrested on 22 November 1918 under suspicion of treason. He was accused of plotting to establish councils composed of workers, peasants and soldiers in place of the existing authorities with the aim of reviving the Habsburg monarchy, or working on behalf of foreign powers or the Bolsheviks.

The affair came amid widespread unrest in the country, advancing Italian Army forces enforcing territorial claims along the Adriatic Sea coast based on the Treaty of London, and in the immediate aftermath of a conference held in Geneva on 6–9 November. Representatives of the State of Slovenes, Croats and Serbs, the government of the Kingdom of Serbia, Serbian parliamentary opposition, and the Yugoslav Committee met there to discuss establishment of a common state and produced the Geneva Declaration on a confederation. The agreement was quickly repudiated by Serbia and Pribićević. The Lipošćak affair provided Pribićević a pretext to press demands for speedy unification with Serbia – which took place on 1 December. A month later, Lipošćak was retired from active duty, cleared of charges, and released.

== Background ==
=== State of Slovenes, Croats and Serbs ===
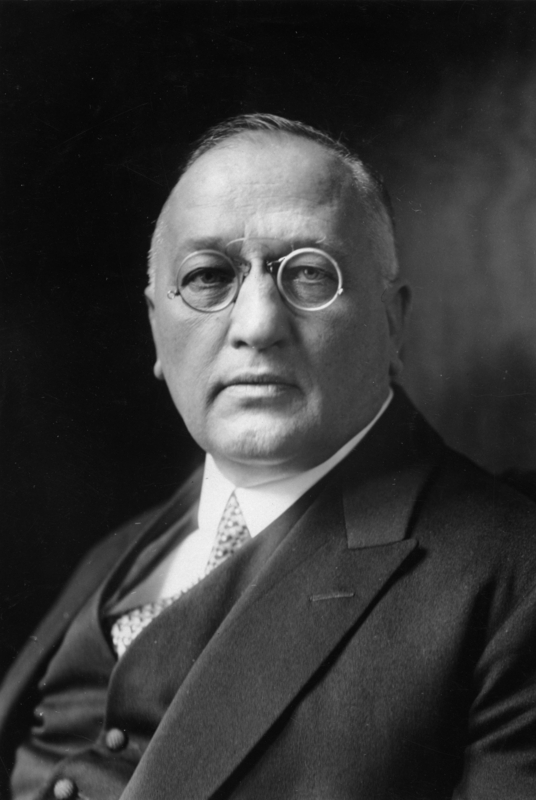
Anton Korošec presided over the National Council of Slovenes, Croats and Serbs

On 5–6 October, in the final weeks of the First World War, representatives of political parties representing the Croats, the Serbs, and the Slovenes living in Austria-Hungary established the National Council of Slovenes, Croats and Serbs as a representative body with the aim of achieving independence from the empire. On 18 October, the body declared itself the central organ of the newly proclaimed State of Slovenes, Croats and Serbs encompassing the Slovene Lands, Croatia-Slavonia, Dalmatia, and Bosnia and Herzegovina. The National Council elected the leader of the Slovene People's Party (SLS) Anton Korošec its president. The National Council had two vice presidents: One was Svetozar Pribićević – the leader of the Croat-Serb Coalition (HSK), the ruling party in Croatia-Slavonia; Another vice president was Ante Pavelić, the leader of the Mile Starčević faction of the Party of Rights (SSP).

On 26 October, the National Council decided to authorise the Yugoslav Committee, an ad hoc group of emigrés led by Ante Trumbić promoting the interests of the Croats, Serbs, and Slovenes living in Austria-Hungary during the war, to speak on behalf of the council. On the same day, Korošec met Austrian Minister-President Heinrich Lammasch in Vienna and proceeded to Switzerland with Gregor Žerjav, the secretary of the Yugoslav Club of South Slavic representatives in the Imperial Council. There they were met by Melko Čingrija, another Yugoslav Club member, on 29 October. Korošec was tasked by the National Council to "reconnoiter the international situation and establish contact with the Yugoslav Committee".

In 1917, the Yugoslav Committee had established contacts with the government of Serbia led by the prime minister Nikola Pašić and they produced the Corfu Declaration on unification of the South Slavs in a parliamentary constitutional monarchy. The declaration left the choice between a federation or a unitary state for a later date. The day Korošec arrived in Switzerland, 29 October 1918, the Croatian Sabor declared the end of ties with Austria-Hungary and elected Korošec the president of the State of Slovenes, Croats and Serbs. Pavelić and Pribićević were elected vice presidents.

=== Unrest in the country ===
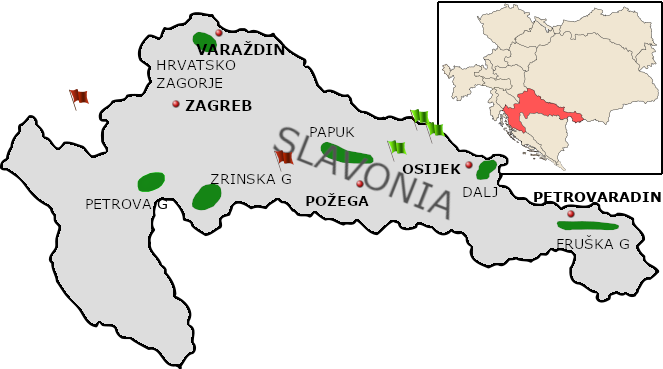
Green Cadres concentrations in Croatia-Slavonia in 1918 (shaded green); Locations of peasant (green flags) and soviet republics (red flags)

During the war, the Austro-Hungarian Army saw mass desertions of conscripts from rural areas who escaped from barracks, hospitals or never reported back after a leave. Most lived at home and only fled to nearby forests to evade gendarmes when warned by local population. In 1917, the deserters were first referred to as the Green Cadres by the authorities in the Croatia-Slavonia. By September 1918, there were about 50,000 Green Cadres among the Croats, Serbs, and Bosniaks (about 10,000 in Bosnia, and the bulk in Croatia-Slavonia). Petrova Gora, Fruška Gora, Zrinska Gora, and Papuk mountains, as well as Hrvatsko Zagorje, and the surroundings of the village of Dalj saw large numbers of the Green Cadres.

The worst violence in Croatia-Slavonia took place from 24 October to 4 November. It was precipitated with an army rebellion in Požega joined by the Green Cadres on 24 October. Violence spread westwards to Nova Gradiška and Kutina; and eastwards to Našice to Osijek where elements of the 23rd Regiment and the 28th Regiment of the Royal Croatian Home Guard joined looting. The Green Cadres also took part in the Našice and Osijek looting, albeit in a secondary role. The army rebelled and also mutinied and joined looting in Petrovaradin, Pakrac, Daruvar, and Županja. Russian Army prisoners of war were released and they joined the looting, just like prisoners released by mob from prisons in Zagreb. Nonetheless, most of the looting was done by peasants and the (mostly peasant) Green Cadres. Pillaging affected the entire Slavonia and the Hrvatsko Zagorje. After hesitation of the civil authorities reinforced the sense of impunity, the National Council tried to deploy locally raised National Guards militia to little effect as they were drawn from the same looting peasants. The National Council resorted to conscription of Serbian prisoners of war to combat looters, and sent a delegation to the Royal Serbian Army command on 5 November asking them to deploy to Croatia-Slavonia to help suppress the unrest. In late November, the situation deteriorated further as the Italian Army began advancing on the eastern shore of the Adriatic Sea to enforce Italian claims under the Treaty of London in Dalmatia and by seizing Rijeka. There were also news about Hungarian efforts to restore rule in Croatia-Slavonia as a part of the Lands of the Crown of Saint Stephen and unrest in the region of Međimurje.

=== Geneva Declaration ===
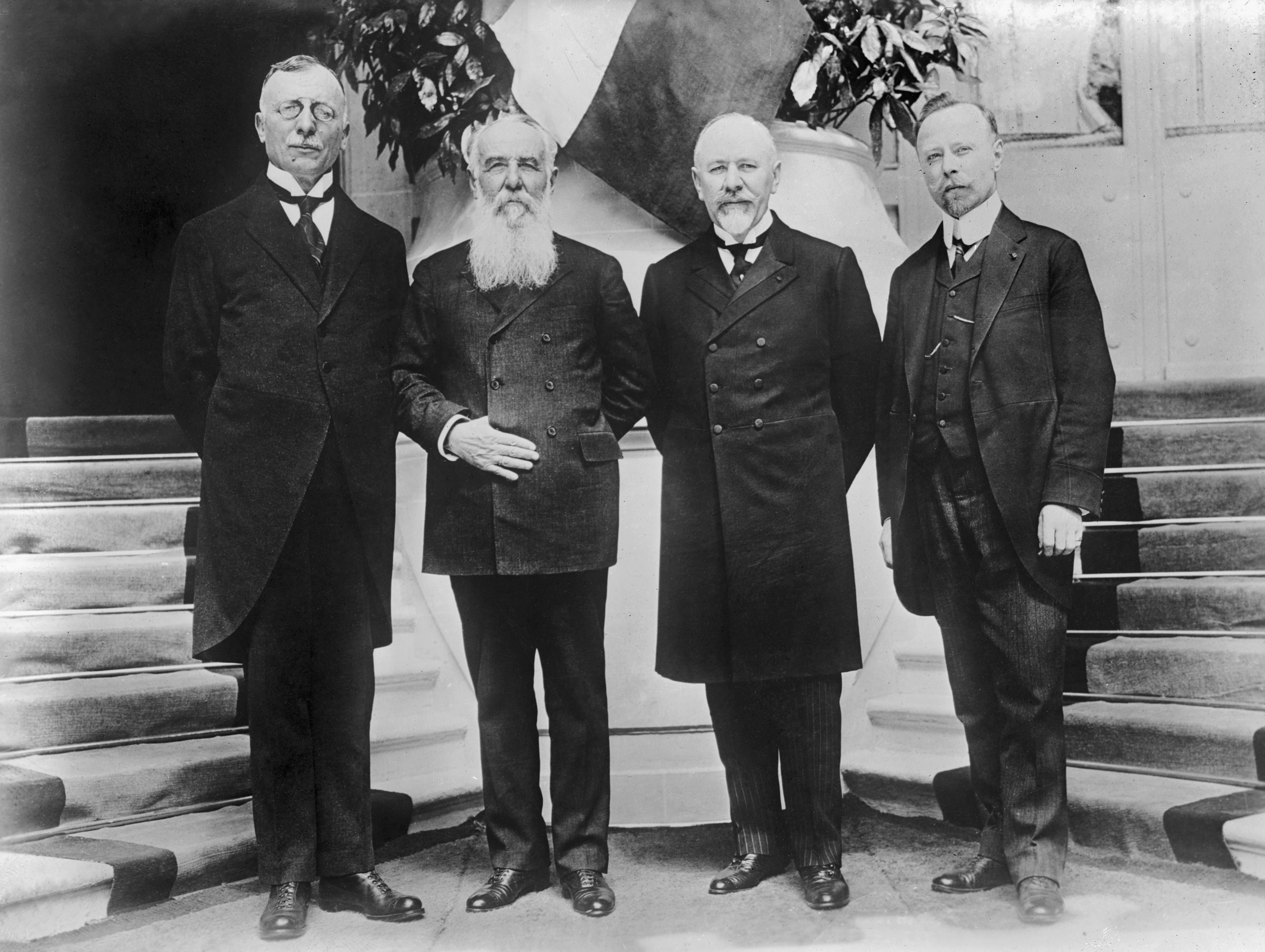
Ante Trumbić and Nikola Pašić (first and second from the left) negotiated the Corfu and Geneva declarations.

Following 3 November Armistice of Villa Giusti, ending the war for Austria-Hungary, Pašić, Serbian opposition leaders, Trumbić, and Korošec were informed by David Lloyd George, the prime minister of the United Kingdom that no South Slavic union would be considered unless they cooperated on the matter and they all met on 6–9 November in Geneva, Switzerland. Trumbić and Korošec quickly agreed with each other – forming a joint negotiating bloc. Trumbić proposed a solution involving establishment of a common government for common affairs – cooperating with the government of Serbia and the National Council. The plan called for preservation of the government of Serbia and the National Council to manage other affairs kept within the competences of Serbia and the State of Slovenes, Croats and Serbs respectively. When Trumbić made a similar proposal during the 1917 talks with Pašić that resulted in the Corfu Declaration, Pašić said that if Croats insisted on a federation, Serbian government would abandon the unification project in favour of creation of Greater Serbia. However, prompted by a message from President of France Raymond Poincaré asking him to agree with Korošec, Pašić accepted the plan. The confederal arrangement resembled the dual monarchy system employed by Austria-Hungary.

Pašić notified the Prince Regent Alexander and the finance minister Stojan Protić about the agreement and received Protić's support for the agreement. Only days later, Pašić sent Protić another message pointing out the Prince Regent's right to appoint a new cabinet. Taking cue from the message, Protić repudiated the agreement made in Geneva and resigned along with the rest of the government. According to Ivo Banac, the acceptance followed by repudiation was a tactic to commit the National Council and the Yugoslav Committee to speedy unification while undermining Korošec's authority to strengthen the position held by Pribićević in the National Council. On 25 November, Pribićević informed Pašić by telegraph that he did not feel bound by the Geneva Declaration.

== Coup d'état conspiracy allegations ==
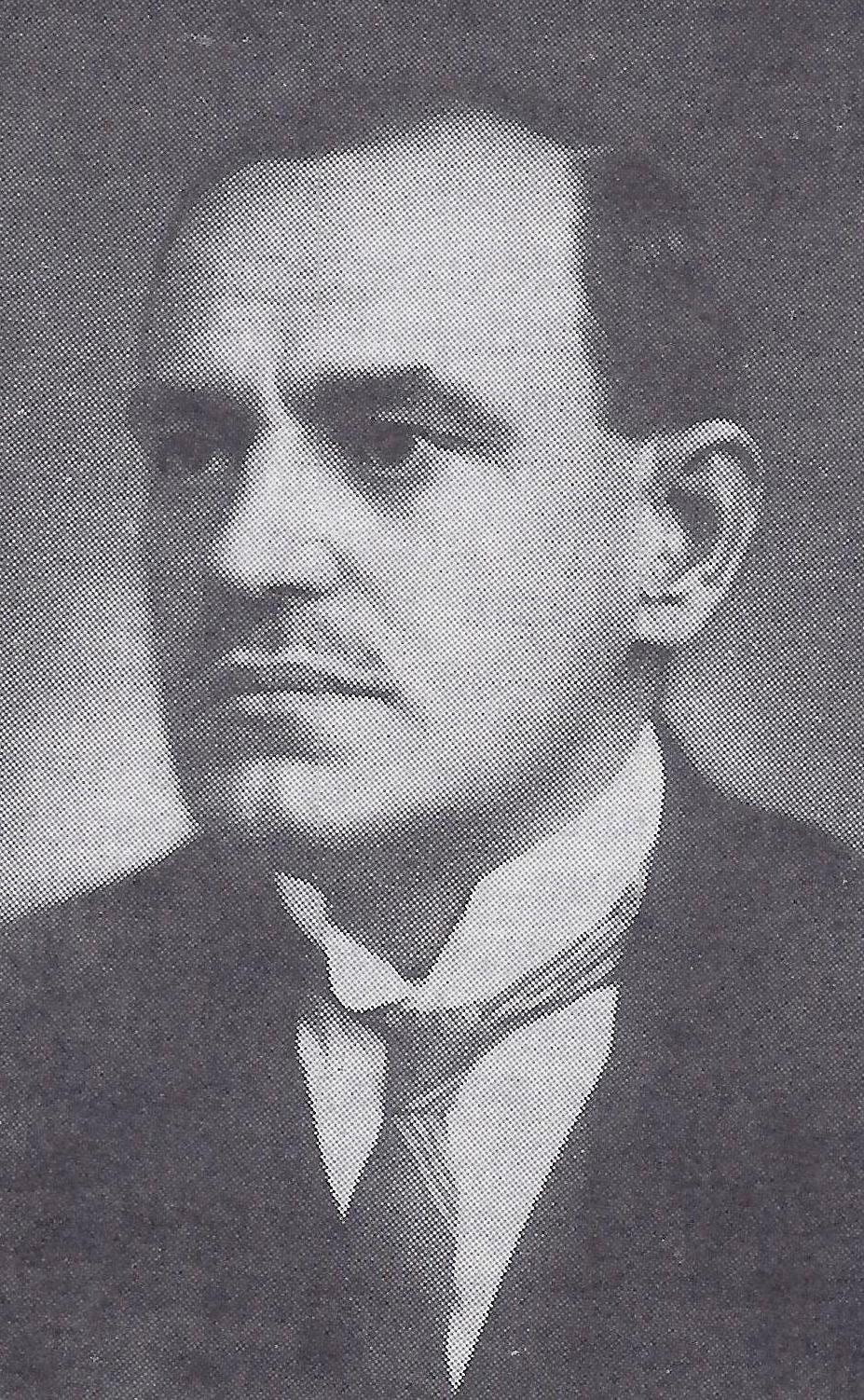
Svetozar Pribićević led the Croat-Serb Coalition which dominated the National Council.

Following repudiation of the Geneva Declaration by the Serbian government and by Pribićević, debate on the type of the future union with Serbia continued among the political parties in the State of Slovenes, Croats and Serbs. The Pribićević's HSK was the main proponent of unconditional speedy unification. Opposition was not well organised, advocating divergent solutions among the parties or even within them. For example the Social Democratic Party of Croatia and Slavonia (SDS) was divided on the matter of monarchy or republic, while the SSP was gradually modifying its positions to resemble more those held by the HSK. The opposition coming from the Frankist faction of the Party of Rights and the Stjepan Radić-led Croatian Peoples' Peasant Party (HPSS) was negligible as the two parties had little support.

Urged by Pribićević to protect against Italian occupation through unification with Serbia, the government of Dalmatia proposed the National Council to go through with the unification within five days on 16 November. It threatened to adopt such a decision unilaterally if the National Council failed to act. Three days later the authorities in Bosnia and Herzegovina accepted the proposal. The proposal was put before the National Council on 20 November, but it was postponed until 23 November on request by Radić who claimed that there were other matters awaiting debate predating the proposal of the Dalmatian government. On 22 November, one day before the scheduled National Council meeting, uncovering of an alleged conspiracy of former officers of the Austro-Hungarian Army was announced.

The alleged ringleader of the coup d'état was General of the Infantry Anton Lipošćak, the governor-general of the Military Government of Lublin in the final months of the war. Lipošćak returned to Zagreb after the armistice and unsuccessfully tried to reach out to the National Council. He met with SDS leader Vitomir Korać and talked to him about the situation in Poland. Upon hearing about an ongoing coup in Poland and how councils composed of workers, peasants and soldiers were taking over power there, Korać interpreted the conversation as an invitation to take part in a coup and he was later identified as the first person to uncover the plot. On 22 November, Lieutenant Colonel Dušan Simović, the envoy of the Serbian Army command in Zagreb reported uncovering of the plot aimed at establishing councils composed of workers, peasants and soldiers in place of the National Council. Lipošćak and his former adjutant Captain Milutin Valenteković were arrested. The press announced that the plot was wide-ranging, but specified no other names of involved persons – speculating that it must involve disgruntled Austro-Hungarian officers. There were further speculations that the conspirators were supported by Radić, or allied with Italian and/or Hungarian interests, as well as that Lipošćak was a Bolshevik or pretending to be a Bolshevik aiming to restore the Habsburg Empire. Some press reports specified that the conspirators planned to arrest the National Council to prevent its actions. The contemporary press reports indicated that the conspirators planned to seize power on 25 November, but sources available a hundred years after the events only allow their limited reconstruction.

On 25 November, Hungarian government of Mihály Károlyi denied involvement in the conspiracy. In a message delivered to the National Council by its military authorised representative Gyula Gömbös, Hungary also condemned all attempts to re-establish Austria-Hungary, especially its old regime. The message concluded that the conspiracy would be aimed against Hungarian independence and a crime. The Italian press portrayed the reported conspiracy as evidence that the State of Slovenes, Croats and Serbs was in anarchy and that no effective government existed – justifying Italian occupation of the eastern Adriatic shores.

== Aftermath ==
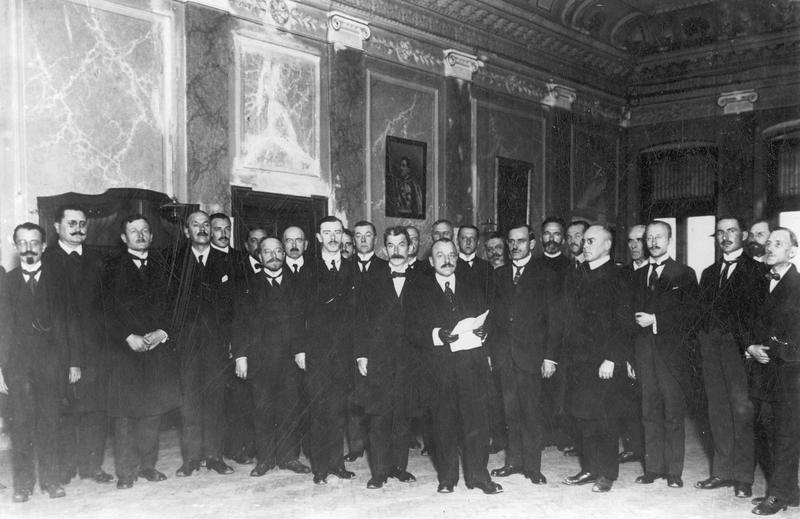
Address of the delegation of the National Council of the State of Slovenes, Croats and Serbs to the Prince Regent Alexander

At 5 p.m. on 23 November (the day when most newspapers reported the arrest of Lipošćak on suspicion of plotting the coup), the central committee of the National Council met in Zagreb to discuss the request of the Dalmatian government on quick unification with Serbia. The affair provided Pribićević with a pretext to demand urgent unification with Serbia for security reasons. Pribićević delivered introductory remarks referencing chaotic situation in the country as the reason necessitating fast unification. The debate continued until the morning of the next day. It included references to the alleged coup plot and claims that it was evidence of continued desire of Charles I of Austria to rule the South Slavs. A seven-man committee was appointed to draft conclusions of the National Council for its evening meeting. The draft specified appointment of a 28-strong delegation to be sent to Belgrade with instructions to ask the Prince Regent for establishment of a unified state. The conclusions were adopted by an overwhelming majority in the night of 24/25 November, and the delegation was instructed to depart to Belgrade three days later. The delegation ignored the instructions to request a federation when it addressed the Prince Regent on 1 December. The Prince Regent accepted the unification offer on behalf of Peter I of Serbia, and the Kingdom of Serbs, Croats and Slovenes was established without any agreement on the conditions of the union.

In late November, Lipošćak asked for a trial against himself apparently convinced of his innocence. There was no trial: Valenteković was released in early December on Pavelić's proposal. The government of Croatia-Slavonia discussed the Lipošćak affair on 13 December and decided, prompted by the National Council commissioner for the interior, Srđan Budisavljević, it was not competent to decide on his release from custody since the matter was military one. The commissioner for defence of the National Council, Mate Drinković retired Lipošćak on 1 January 1919. A total of 134 officers formerly serving the Austro-Hungarian Army were retired that day. They included twenty general officers and nine Lieutenant field marshals. Days later, the Military Tribunal in Zagreb cleared Lipošćak and Valenteković of charges of treason finding no actions to prosecute and Lipošćak was released. He was kept under surveillance until his death in 1924.

The affair and the 1918 protest in Zagreb were cited as pretext for disbanding of Croatian military units as unreliable. The National Council commissioner for defence proposed by the end of November 1918 to establish new military units under guidance of the chief of the Serbian Army delegation to the National Council, Colonel Milan Pribićević.

According to historian Tomislav Zorko, the threat of the military coup led by Lipošćak was meant to apply pressure and impart a sense of urgency on those politicians who were having doubts about the method and course of unification with Serbia proposed by Svetozar Pribićević. There were suspicions regarding authenticity of the charges in immediate aftermath of the affair. Most sources (including Budisavljević) agree that the coup conspiracy allegations were fabricated and some of them indicate Pribićević and his allies as the source of the accusations. Other sources are attributing the affair to a panicked reaction of the National Council to Lipošćak's return to Zagreb. The council doubted his loyalty regardless of Lipošćak's 12 November note informing the council he was willing to offer his services. In any case, the National Council assumed that Lipošćak would not contravene his oath to the emperor and that he would ask to be released from honouring it first – like the Lieutenant Field Marshal Mihael Mihaljević and General of the Infantry Luka Šnjarić did only few weeks earlier. A minority view is that the allegations against Lipošćak were justified. A century later, there is no evidence to support the claim that Lipošćak was plotting a coup or that Pribićević fabricated the charges.

== Sources ==
- Banac, Ivo (1984). The National Question in Yugoslavia: Origins, History, Politics. Ithaca: Cornell University Press. ISBN 0-8014-1675-2.
- Banac, Ivo (1992). "'Emperor Karl Has Become a Comitadji': The Croatian Disturbances of Autumn 1918". The Slavonic and East European Review. 70 (2). London: Modern Humanities Research Association: 284–305. ISSN 0037-6795. JSTOR 4210927.
- Beneš, Jakub S. (2017). "The Green Cadres and the Collapse of Austria-Hungary in 1918". Past & Present (236). Oxford: Oxford University Press: 207–241. doi:10.1093/pastj/gtx028. ISSN 0031-2746.
- Guštin, Damijan (2019). "Narodna vlada SHS v Ljubljani v obrambnih zadevah: vzpostavljanje obrambnega sistema Države SHS leta 1918 med legislativo in realnostjo" [The National Government of SHS in Ljubljana Regarding the Matters of Defence: The Establishment of the State of SHS Defence System in 1918 Between Legislation and Reality]. Prispevki za novejšo zgodovino (in Slovenian). 59 (2). Ljubljana: Inštitut za novejšo zgodovino: 75–94. doi:10.51663/pnz.59.2.04. ISSN 0353-0329. S2CID 214259527.
- Huzjan, Vladimir (2005). "Raspuštanje Hrvatskog domobranstva nakon završetka Prvog svjetskog rata" [The Demobilization of the Croatian Home Guards After the End of the First World War]. Časopis za suvremenu povijest (in Croatian). 37 (2). Zagreb: Croatian Institute of History: 445–465. ISSN 0590-9597.
- Janković, Dragoslav (1964). "Ženevska konferencija o stvaranju jugoslovenske zajednice 1918. godine" [Geneva Conference on Creation of the Yugoslav Community in 1918]. Istorija XX veka [History of the 20th Century] (in Serbian). Vol. V. Belgrade: Institute of Legal History of the University of Belgrade Faculty of Law. pp. 225–262. OCLC 67000822.
- Karaula, Željko (2008). "30 dana što su potresli Bjelovar – Odbor narodnog vĳ eća Bjelovara tokom studenog 1918. godine" [30 Days That Shocked Bjelovar – The National Council Committee of the City of Bjelovar During November of 1918]. Radovi Zavoda za znanstveni rad Varaždin (in Croatian) (19). Varaždin: Croatian Academy of Sciences and Arts - Institute for Scientific Research Work in Varaždin: 251–274. ISSN 0352-9509.
- Matijević, Zlatko (2008). "The National Council of Slovenes, Croats and Serbs in Zagreb (1918/1919)". Review of Croatian History. 4 (1). Zagreb: Hrvatski institut za povijest: 51–84. ISSN 1845-4380.
- Newman, John Paul (2010). "Post-imperial and Post-war Violence in the South Slav Lands, 1917-1923". Contemporary European History. 19 (3). New York: Cambridge University Press: 249–265. doi:10.1017/S0960777310000159. ISSN 0960-7773. JSTOR 20749812. S2CID 62795053.
- Newman, John Paul (2015). Yugoslavia in the Shadow of War: Veterans and the Limits of State Building, 1903–1945. Cambridge: Cambridge University Press. ISBN 9781107070769.
- Pavlović, Vojislav G (2019). "Italy and the Creation of Yugoslavia. Delenda Austria?". In Pavlović, Vojislav G. (ed.). Serbia and Italy in the Great War. Belgrade: Institute for Balkan Studies. pp. 245–278. ISBN 9788671791038.
- Ramet, Sabrina P. (2006). The Three Yugoslavias: State-building and Legitimation, 1918–2005. Bloomington: Indiana University Press. ISBN 9780253346568.
- Šepić, Dragovan (1968). "The Question of Yugoslav Union in 1918". Journal of Contemporary History. 3 (4). SAGE Publishing: 29–43. doi:10.1177/002200946800300403. ISSN 0022-0094. JSTOR 259849. S2CID 159110607.
- Tucker, Spencer C. (1998). The Great War, 1914-18. London: UCL Press. ISBN 1-85728-390-2.
- Zorko, Tomislav (2003). "Afera Lipošćak" [The Lipošćak Affair]. Časopis za suvremenu povijest (in Croatian). 35 (3). Zagreb: Croatian Institute of History: 887–902. ISSN 0590-9597.
