= Lepšić =

- Settlement
- Location within Croatia
- Country: Croatia
- County: Zagreb
- Town: Ivanić-Grad

Area
  - Total: 3.3 km^{2} (1.3 sq mi)

Population (2021)
  - Total: 39
  - Density: 12/km^{2} (31/sq mi)
- Time zone: UTC+1 (CET)
  - Summer (DST): UTC+2 (CEST)

Lepšić is a settlement in the Ivanić-Grad town of Zagreb County, Croatia. As of 2011 it had a population of 46 people.

== Notable people ==
- Venerable Josip Lang (1857-1924), bishop
