= Šumećani =

Human settlement in Croatia

- Location within Croatia
- Coordinates: 45°43′N 16°29′E
- Country: Croatia
- County: Zagreb County
- City: Ivanić-Grad

Area
  - Total: 8.2 km^{2} (3.2 sq mi)

Population (2021)
  - Total: 389
  - Density: 47/km^{2} (120/sq mi)
- Time zone: UTC+1 (CET)
  - Summer (DST): UTC+2 (CEST)

Šumećani is a naselje (settlement) in Zagreb County, Croatia, close to Zagreb and part of the town of Ivanić-Grad. Šumećani covers an area of 8.28 km^{2} (3.20 sq mi) and according to the 2011 census, it had 494 inhabitants.
