= Prečno =

Coordinates: 45°40′N 16°18′E

- Settlement
- Location within Croatia
- Country: Croatia
- County: Zagreb
- Town: Ivanić-Grad

Area
  - Total: 5.2 km^{2} (2.0 sq mi)

Population (2021)
  - Total: 64
  - Density: 12/km^{2} (32/sq mi)
- Time zone: UTC+1 (CET)
  - Summer (DST): UTC+2 (CEST)

Prečno is a settlement in the Ivanić-Grad town of Zagreb County, Croatia. As of 2011, it had a population of 98 people(as of 2011).
