= Naftalan, Azerbaijan =

City in Azerbaijan

Naftalan
- City Subordinate to the Republic
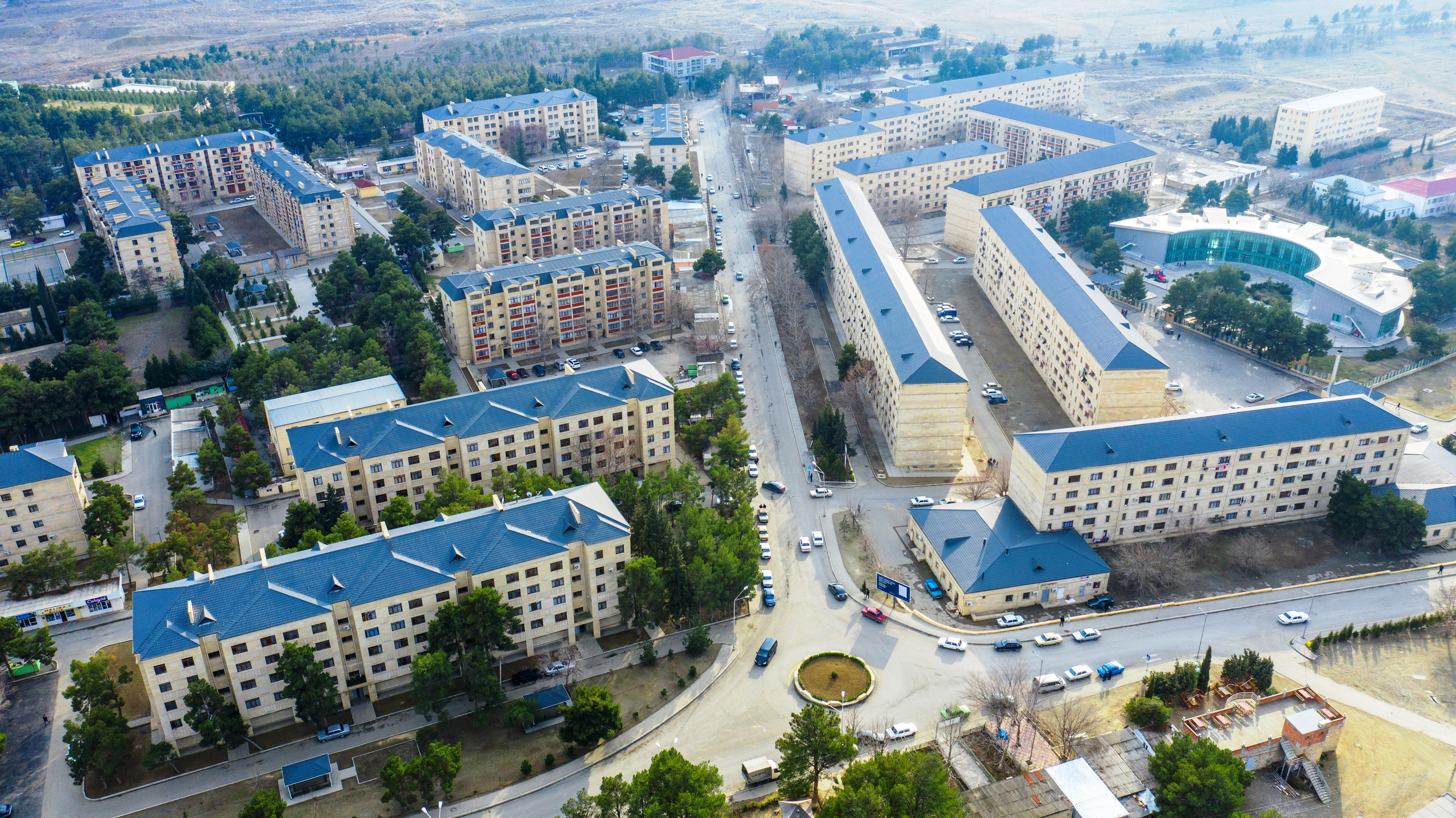

- Coordinates: 40°30′24″N 46°49′30″E
- Country: Azerbaijan
- Region: Ganja-Dashkasan
- Founded: 28 April 1967

Government
  - Governor: Vugar Novruzov

Area
  - Total: 40 km^{2} (15 sq mi)

Population (2020)
  - Total: 10,200
  - Density: 250/km^{2} (660/sq mi)
- Time zone: UTC+4 (AZT)
- Website: naftalan-ih.gov.az

Naftalan is a city in Azerbaijan, known as a medical touristic center. It is located on an agricultural plain near the Lesser Caucasus Mountains. The word naftalan also means a petroleum product that can be obtained there. It is the centre of a petroleum industry, with a grade of oil referred to as "Naftalan".

The city is located approximately 330 kilometers west of Baku, 50 kilometers from Ganja city, and 40 kilometers from Mingachevir city. It is 225 meters above sea level and experiences a warm spring and mild winter climate, with an average annual temperature of approximately +14.8 degrees Celsius. The city covers an area of 35.73 square kilometers.

== Etymology ==
The word Naftalan, can be traced to the Greek word "naphtha" ("νάφθα"), meaning pertaining to oil, and the Azerbaijani suffix "-alan", which is of the verb "to take" (and literally meaning "oil buyer").

== History ==
Archaeological findings in the region date to the 12th century AD. Naftalan city was functioning as a settlement within the Goranboy and Yevlakh districts until 1967. On April 28, 1967, Naftalan was granted the status of the subordinate city. The city of Naftalan consists of a city and two villages. The base of Naftalan city is Sanatorium - Resort infrastructure. Naftalan Resort has been operating since 1933. The resort is built around Naftalan oil, a medicinal oil with a high content of naphthenic hydrocarbons that is applied through baths and local treatments for skin conditions such as psoriasis and eczema and for joint disorders.In 1938, the Naftalan Experimental Laboratory was established in the Azerbaijan Scientific-Research Institute of Medical Rehabilitation. The biological and therapeutic effects of the Naftalan oil began to be studied there. Also, in 1965, Scientific Research Laboratory was established in Naftalan.

In the 2010s, the number of hotels increased in the city after the Azerbaijani government's tourism policy.

== Geography ==
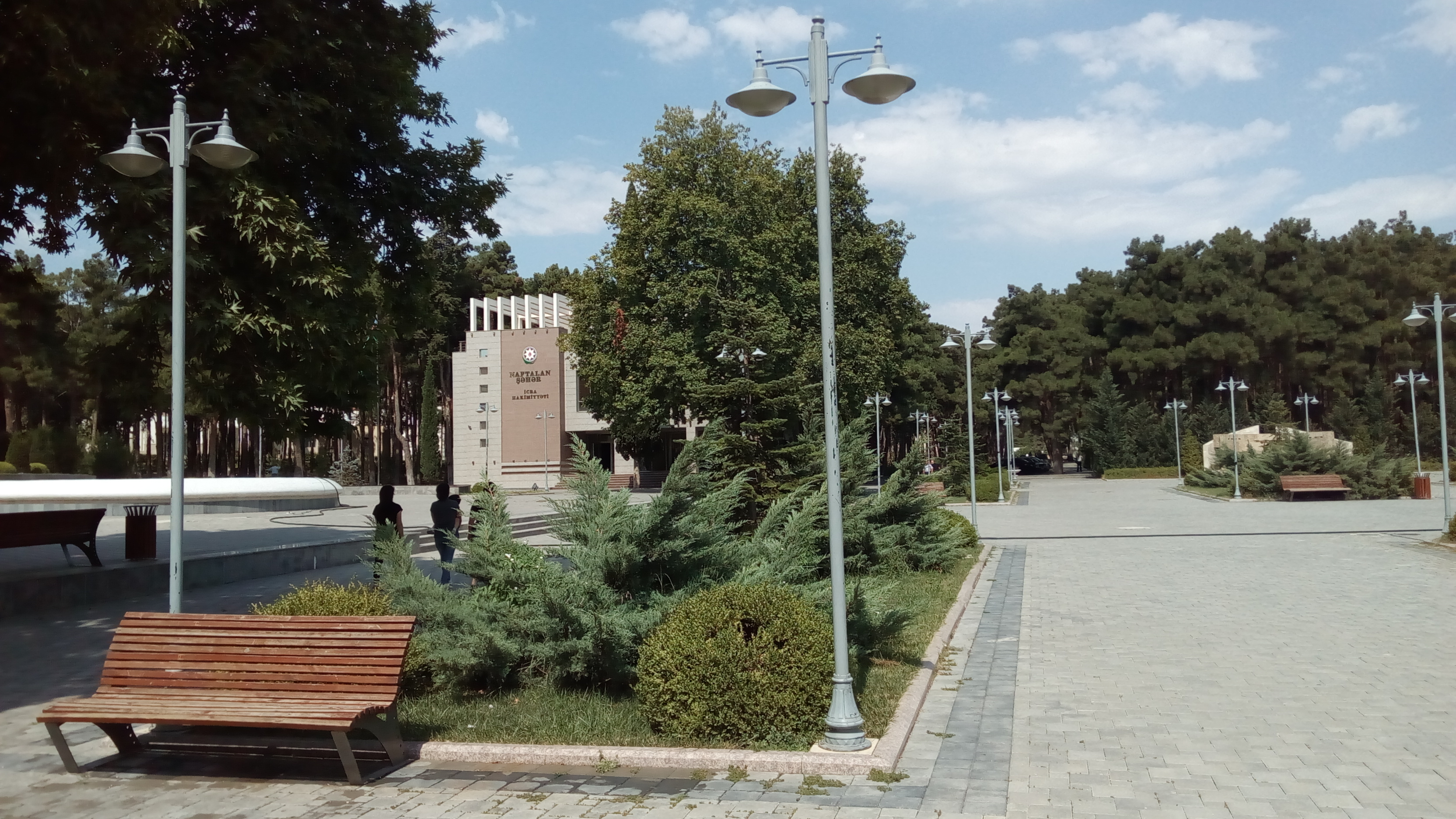
Park in Naftalan

Naftalan city is located 330 km west of Baku, 50 km from Ganja in the foothills of the Lesser Caucasus Mountains. It's located at an altitude of 225 m above sea level. The spring is warm, the winter is soft here. The average annual temperature is +14.8 degrees. The wind in Naftalan is mainly monsoon. The city's territory is 35.73 km^{2}.

== Demographics ==
According to the 1999 census, the population in Naftalan was 7,551. Around 7,400 of the population is Azerbaijani.

Ethnic Groups Population (1979 census)

- Azerbaijanis 7400 (98.00%)
- Tatars 6 (0.2%)
- Russians 136 (3.8%)
- Armenians 182 (5.1%)
- Lezgins 7 (0.2%)

== Economy ==
=== Petroleum spas ===
Naftalan Hotel by Rixos

The area is home to petroleum spas (or "oil spas"), that were popular vacation spots of the Soviet Union. At the height of their Soviet-era popularity, the spas in Naftalan had 75,000 visitors a year. The combination of the First Nagorno-Karabakh War and the end of Soviet-sponsored free trips brought the industry to its knees in the late-1980s. All but one of the older spas were converted into refugee housing. The remaining spa, the Naftalan Therapeutic Center, had 1,000-beds.

The number of domestic and foreign tourists coming to Naftalan, which had a capacity of about 2,200 tourists a day, has increased by 5–6 times in 2016 and reached 30,000. As of 2017 the city has again become a major destination for health tourism.

Qarabağ SPA and Resort

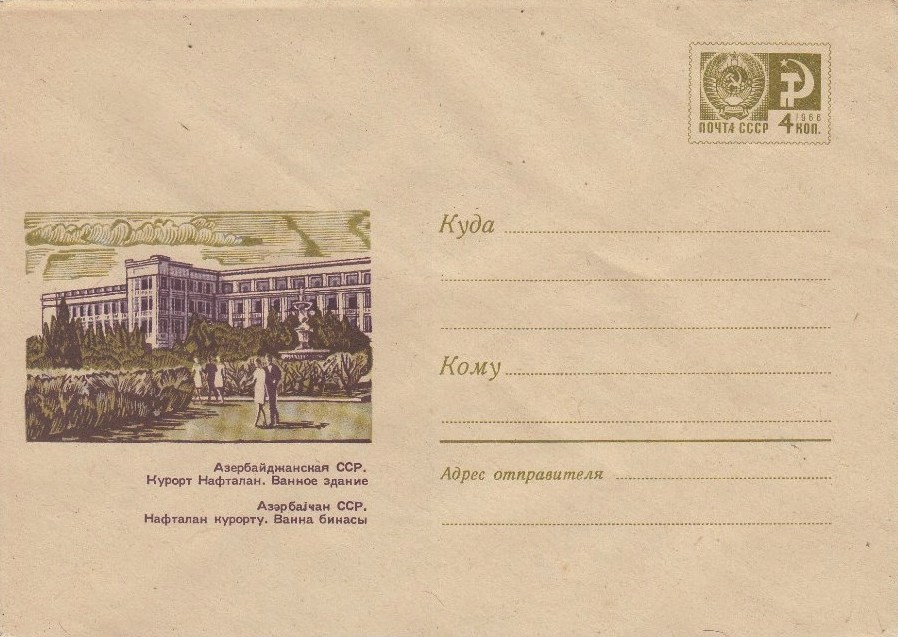
Baths Resort Naftalan

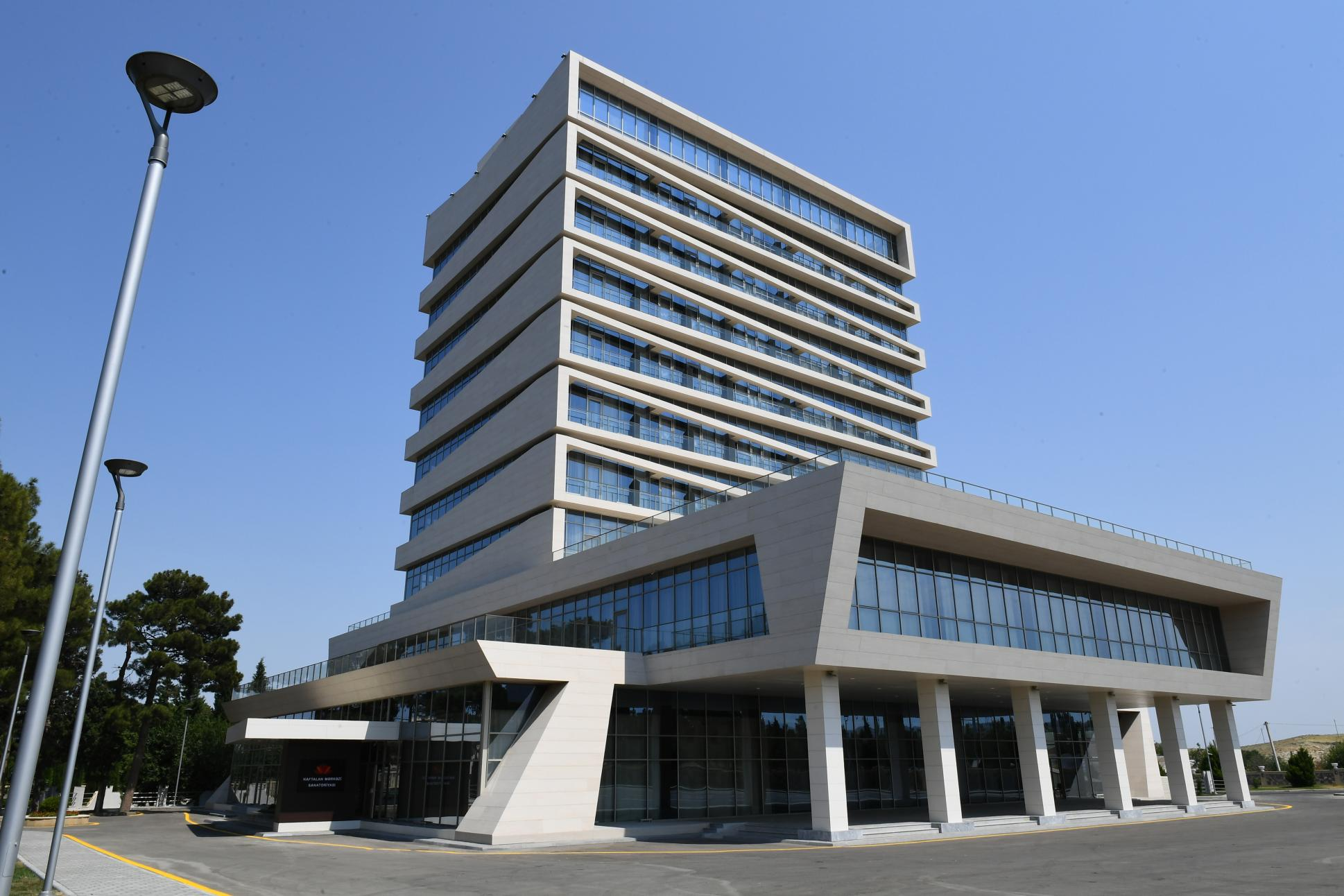
Naftalan Central Sanatorium

== Culture ==
There are two Houses of Culture that promote national traditions. Also, there is the Naftalan Museum and Music School. There are four parks in the city of Naftalan.

== Education ==
There are three general education schools and one Children's Creative Center in the city.

== Transport ==
Naftalan resort city can be reached by car or train from Baku and Ganja cities. The closest route for foreign visitors is the flight to Ganja International Airport.

== Governance ==
The administrative authority of Naftalan city is overseen by the Head of the Executive Power of Naftalan, who is responsible for its governance. Over the years, there have been several individuals who have held the position of the city's head since 2004:

1. Sadigov Fizuli Vali oghlu (2004–2006)
2. Musayev Musa Hazi oghlu (2006–2010)
3. Aslanov Natiq Musa oghlu (2010–2018)
4. İbrahimov Rovshan Huseyn oghlu (2018–2019)
5. Novruzov Vugar Vahid oghlu (2019–present)

== Sister cities ==
Naftalan is twinned with:

- L'Aigle, France (2013)
- Positano, Italy (2013)
- Yessentuki, Russia (2014)
- Uniejów, Poland (2014)
- Ivanić-Grad, Croatia (2023)
