= Križ, Zagreb County =

Križ
- Municipality
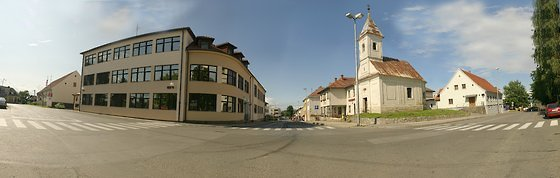
- Križ town center

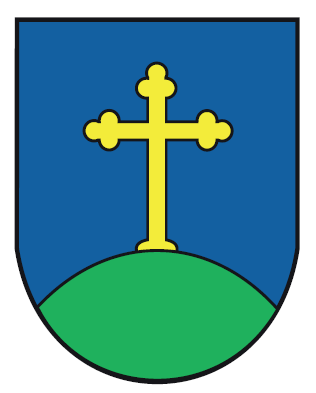
- Coat of arms
- Interactive map of Križ
- Location within Croatia
- Coordinates: 45°39′43″N 16°31′22″E
- Country: Croatia
- Region: Central Croatia
- County: Zagreb County

Area
  - Municipality: 117.8 km^{2} (45.5 sq mi)
  - Urban: 7.4 km^{2} (2.9 sq mi)
- Highest elevation: 120 m (390 ft)

Population (2021)
  - Municipality: 6,098
  - Density: 51.77/km^{2} (134.1/sq mi)
  - Urban: 1,604
  - Urban density: 220/km^{2} (560/sq mi)
- Area code: 01
- Vehicle registration: ZG
- Website: opcina-kriz.hr

Križ is a village and a municipality of western Moslavina, located southeast from Zagreb, near Ivanić-Grad. In the 2011 Croatian census, the population of the Križ municipality numbers 6,963 people, with 1,821 residents in the village itself.

== Settlements ==
In the 2011 census, the total municipality population was 6,963, in the following settlements:

- Bunjani, population 636
- Donji Prnjarovec, population 71
- Gornji Prnjarovec, population 369
- Johovec, population 144
- Konšćani, population 166
- Križ, population 1,821
- Mala Hrastilnica, population 91
- Novoselec, population 1,362
- Obedišće, population 580
- Okešinec, population 422
- Razljev, population 131
- Rečica Kriška, population 346
- Širinec, population 256
- Šušnjari, population 133
- Velika Hrastilnica, population 166
- Vezišće, population 269

== History ==
Križ is an historic place and centre of "Ivanić region". The history of Križ, or "Križ pod Obedom" as it was once called, is closely tied to the history of "Ivanić Grad and Kloštar Ivanić", even though Križ has some unique roots, too. As customary in the past, the place was named after a sacral monument – the church of the Assumption of the Holy Cross. "Križ" (meaning Cross) is indirectly mentioned for the first time in 1334, when it was recorded as one of Zagreb Diocese parishes.

Until 1918, Križ (named MILITAER KRIZ before 1850) was part of the Austrian monarchy (Kingdom of Croatia-Slavonia after the compromise of 1867), in the Croatian Military Frontier, Warasdin-Kreutzer Regiment N°V. In 1920, the town was the centre of peasant rebellion.

== Monuments and sightseeings ==
Archaeological finds in Sipćina, near Okešinec, tells us that people used to inhabit this region very early in the past.

In the fire that caught the old parish church in 1714, the central altar was burnt and six years later in 1720, it was replaced with a new altar featuring priceless wooden sculptures, and adorned with pieces made of gold from the 18th and 19th centuries. Around the church, there is a hundred-year old park created in 1894, as an imitation of the English landscape architecture of the time.

== Economy ==
On the southern municipality border, there is the forest "Žutica" with an oil field. The forest Veliki Jantak, known as the hunting ground, stretches to the east.

Today, around 7,000 people live in 16 settlements of the Križ municipality in an area of 118 square kilometres. The largest companies in the Križ municipality are DIN Novoselec and Elektra Križ (Electric power distribution company). When Croatia became an independent state, new opportunities were available and today, there exist many privately owned businesses.

== Education ==
Education has always had an historic role in the region. A church school existed as far back as the 17th century. In 1790, the first general public school was opened and in 1884, a library and reading-room was added.

== Notable people ==
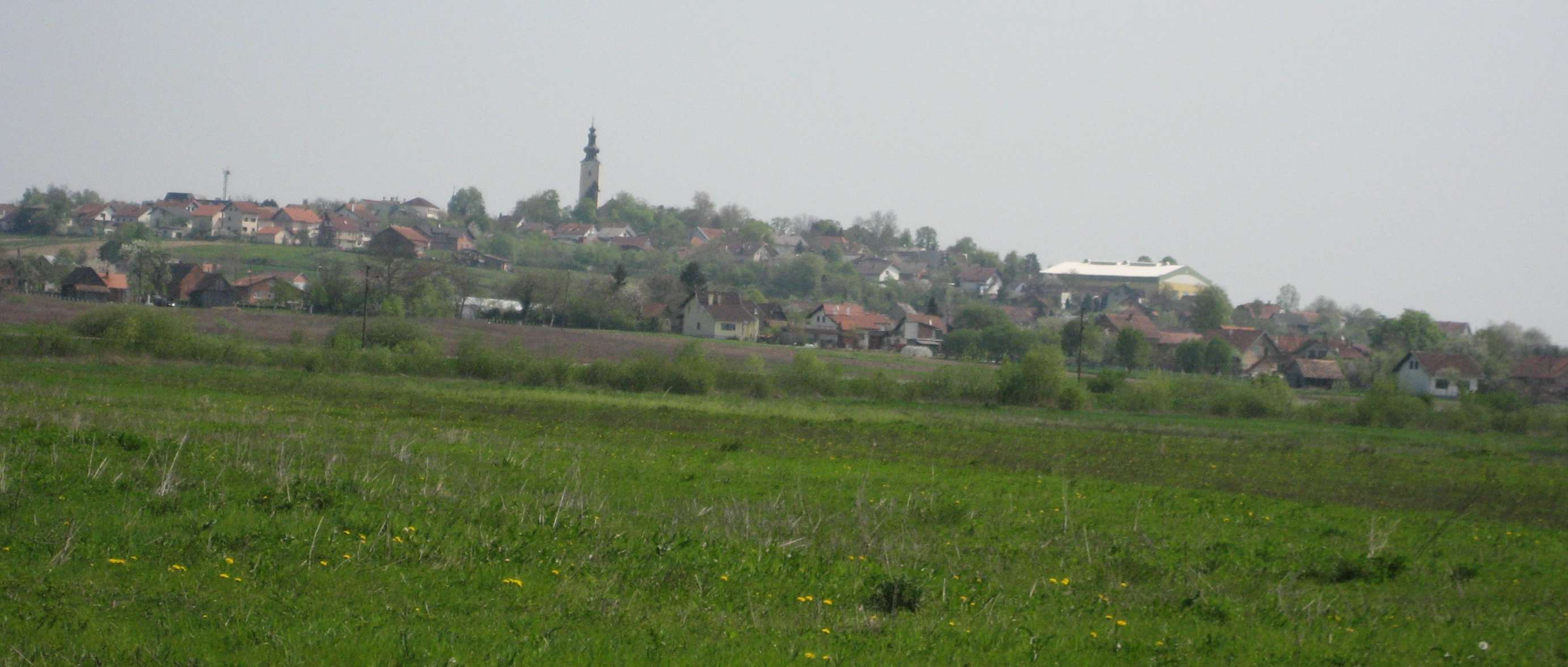
Kriz, Croatia

Milka Trnina, an opera singer, was born in Vezišće, a village located in the Križ municipality.
