= Topolje, Zagreb County =

- Settlement
- Location within Croatia
- Country: Croatia
- County: Zagreb
- Town: Ivanić-Grad

Area
  - Total: 31.5 km^{2} (12.2 sq mi)

Population (2021)
  - Total: 102
  - Density: 3.24/km^{2} (8.39/sq mi)
- Time zone: UTC+1 (CET)
  - Summer (DST): UTC+2 (CEST)

Topolje, Zagreb County is a settlement in the Ivanić-Grad town of Zagreb County, Croatia. As of 2011 it had a population of 112 people.
