= Greda Breška =

- Settlement
- Location within Croatia
- Country: Croatia
- County: Zagreb
- Town: Ivanić-Grad

Area
  - Total: 2.9 km^{2} (1.1 sq mi)

Population (2021)
  - Total: 164
  - Density: 57/km^{2} (150/sq mi)
- Time zone: UTC+1 (CET)
  - Summer (DST): UTC+2 (CEST)

Greda Breška is a settlement in the Ivanić-Grad town of Zagreb County, Croatia. As of 2011 it had a population of 156 people.
