= Novoselec =

- Location within Croatia
- Coordinates: 45.652778°N 16.534321°E

Area
  - Total: 4.5 km^{2} (1.7 sq mi)

Population (2021)
  - Total: 1,210
  - Density: 270/km^{2} (700/sq mi)

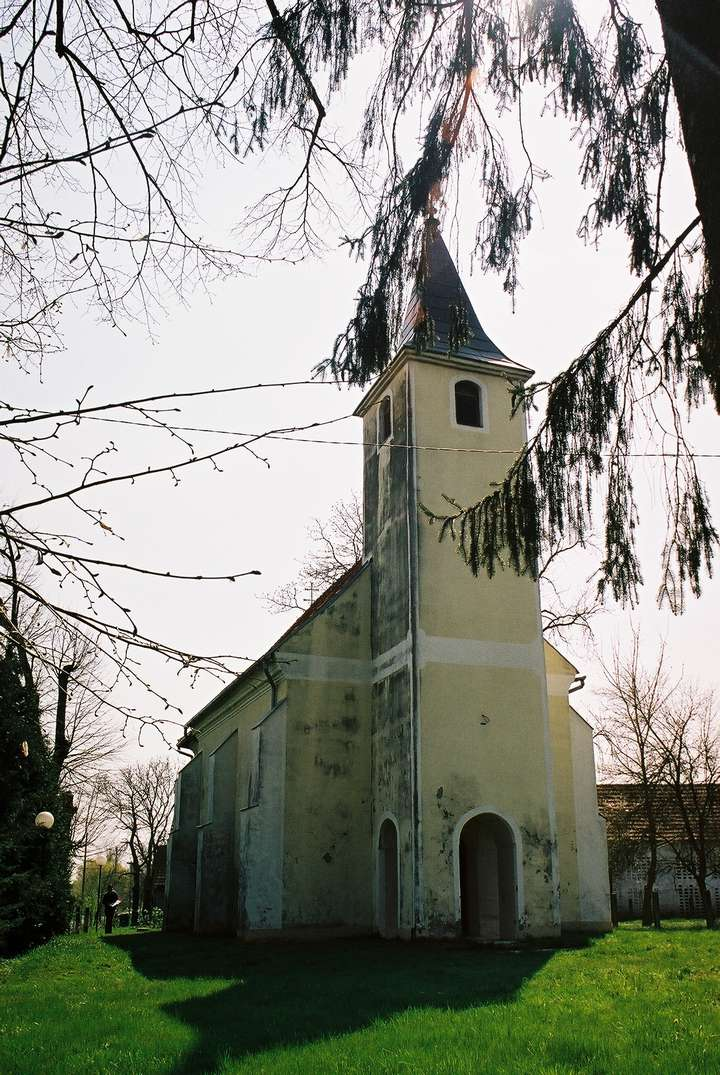
St. Vitus’ church in Novoselec

Novoselec is a village in central Croatia located southeast of Križ. The population is 1,362 (census 2011).
