= Tarno, Croatia =

Coordinates: 45°44′N 16°22′E

- Settlement
- Location within Croatia
- Country: Croatia
- County: Zagreb
- Town: Ivanić-Grad

Population (2011)
  - Total: 57
- Time zone: UTC+1 (CET)
  - Summer (DST): UTC+2 (CEST)

Tarno, Croatia is a settlement in the Ivanić-Grad town of Zagreb County, Croatia. As of 2011 it had a population of 57 people.
