= Posavski Bregi =

Coordinates: 45°41′N 16°21′E

- Settlement
- Location within Croatia
- Country: Croatia
- County: Zagreb
- Town: Ivanić-Grad

Area
  - Total: 18.1 km^{2} (7.0 sq mi)

Population (2021)
  - Total: 697
  - Density: 38.5/km^{2} (99.7/sq mi)
- Time zone: UTC+1 (CET)
  - Summer (DST): UTC+2 (CEST)

Posavski Bregi is a settlement in the Ivanić-Grad town of Zagreb County, Croatia. As of 2011 it had a population of 816 people.
