= Anton Lipošćak =

Austro-Hungarian World War I General

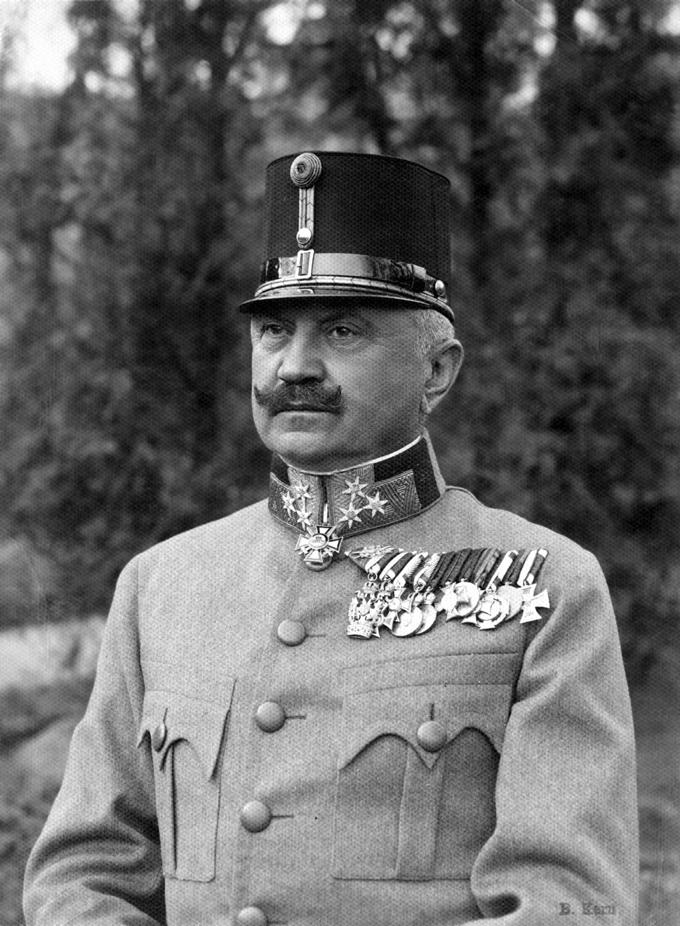

4th Governor-General of the Military Government of Lublin
- In office March 1918 – November 1918
- Appointed by: Charles I of Austria
- Preceded by: Stanisław Szeptycki
- Succeeded by: Office abolished

Personal details
- Born: 9 April 1863 Székelyudvarhely, Hungary, Austrian Empire (now Romania)
- Died: 24 July 1924 (aged 61) Zagreb, Kingdom of Serbs, Croats and Slovenes (now Croatia)
- Resting place: Mirogoj Cemetery, Zagreb
- Education: Theresian Military Academy
- Profession: Soldier
- Awards: Order of the Iron Crown 2nd and 1st class

Military service
- Allegiance: Austria-Hungary
- Branch/service: Austro-Hungarian Army
- Years of service: 1883–1918
- Rank: General of the Infantry
- Unit: 53rd Infantry Regiment
- Commands: Chief of Staff of the 15th Corps; 72nd Brigade of the 13th Corps; 2nd Infantry Division; 42nd Home Guard Infantry Division
- Battles/wars: World War I: Carpathian Front

Anton Lipošćak, (Note: In early reports of the Lipošćak affair and historiography relying on those sources, Lipošćak's surname is erroneously reported as "Lipovšćak".) (9 April 1863 – 24 July 1924) was an Austro-Hungarian Army General of the Infantry of Croatian descent who served as the Governor-General of the Military Government of Lublin during the World War I. After the war, Lipošćak returned to Zagreb where the State of Slovenes, Croats and Serbs declared independence from Austria-Hungary. He was accused of plotting a coup d'état and arrested. Most present-day sources consider the charges false. The charges were dropped and Lipošćak released in two months, in early 1919.

== Military career ==
Anton Lipošćak was born on 9 April 1863 in Székelyudvarhely, Kingdom of Hungary (present day Odorheiu Secuiesc, Romania). He graduated from the Theresian Military Academy in Wiener Neustadt in 1883. He served as an Austro-Hungarian Army lieutenant in the 53rd Infantry Regiment of the Austro-Hungarian Common Army based in Zagreb, Kingdom of Croatia-Slavonia. He was promoted to the rank of oberleutnant in 1888, and to a captain in 1892, when he also became the chief of the press office of the regimental headquarters. In 1905, he was promoted to the rank of colonel and transferred to the post of the chief of staff of the 15th Corps stationed in Sarajevo, Bosnia and Herzegovina. In 1910, he became a Major General and the commanding officer of the 72nd Brigade in the Zagreb-based 13th Corps. In 1913, he assumed command of the 2nd Infantry Division which he led on the First World War Carpathian Front until 1915 – as a lieutenant field marshal since 1914. In 1917, he was promoted to the rank of General of the Infantry and assumed command of the 42nd Home Guard Infantry Division, and the Lipošćak Group (subsequently the 9th Corps) on the Romanian Front. In February 1918, Lipošćak was appointed the Governor-General of the Military Government of Lublin in the Kingdom of Poland and he held the position until the end of the war. Lipošćak was awarded the Order of the Iron Crown second class in 1914, and the first class in 1918.

== Lipošćak affair ==
Lipošćak returned to Zagreb after the Armistice of Villa Giusti and unsuccessfully tried to reach out to the National Council of the recently proclaimed State of Slovenes, Croats and Serbs which seceded from Austria-Hungary. Even though Lipošćak sent a message to the National Council on 12 November 1918 informing it he was willing to offer his services as an officer of Croatian descent, the council assumed that Lipošćak would not contravene his military oath to Charles I of Austria without asking to be released from honouring it first – like the Lieutenant Field Marshal Mihael Mihaljević and General of the Infantry Luka Šnjarić did only few weeks earlier. Lipošćak was arrested on 22 November for allegedly plotting a coup against the National Council in what became known as the Lipošćak affair. Most sources agree that the coup conspiracy allegations were fabricated and some of them indicate the Croat-Serb Coalition leader, Svetozar Pribičević and his allies as the source of the accusations, while others attribute the allegations to a panicked reaction of the council to Lipošćak's return to Zagreb. Lipošćak was retired from active duty on 1 January 1919. Charges against him were dropped days later and he was released. After the release he worked as a clerk of the Prva hrvatska štedionica bank in Zagreb. In March 1920, Lipošćak presided over the inaugural meeting of the Society of Retired Officers and Military Personnel in Croatia and Slavonia (Udruga umirovljenih oficira i vojnih činovnika u Hrvatskoj i Slavoniji) in Zagreb. He was kept under surveillance by the authorities of the Kingdom of Serbs, Croats and Slovenes until his death on 24 July 1924.

== Sources ==
- Matković, Stjepan (2013). "Lipošćak, Antun". Croatian Biographical Lexicon (in Croatian). Zagreb: Miroslav Krleža Institute of Lexicography.
- Newman, John Paul (2015). Yugoslavia in the Shadow of War: Veterans and the Limits of State Building, 1903–1945. Cambridge: Cambridge University Press. ISBN 9781107070769.
- Zorko, Tomislav (2003). "Afera Lipošćak" [The Lipošćak Affair]. Časopis za suvremenu povijest (in Croatian). 35 (3). Zagreb: Croatian Institute of History: 887–902. ISSN 0590-9597.
