= Bukova Greda =

- Village
- Location within Bosnia and Herzegovina
- Coordinates: 45.0302854°N 18.6128139°E
- Country: Bosnia and Herzegovina
- Entity: Federation of Bosnia and Herzegovina
- Canton: Posavina
- Municipality: Orašje

Area
  - Total: 1.37 sq mi (3.55 km^{2})

Population (2013)
  - Total: 134
  - Density: 97.8/sq mi (37.7/km^{2})
- Time zone: UTC+1 (CET)
  - Summer (DST): UTC+2 (CEST)

Bukova Greda is a village in the municipality of Orašje, Bosnia and Herzegovina.

== Demographics ==
According to the 2013 census, its population was 134.

Ethnicity in 2013
Ethnicity	Number	Percentage
Croats	129	96.3%
Serbs	3	2.2%
other/undeclared	2	1.5%
Total	134	100%
