= Military General Government of Lublin =

Austro-Hungarian military administration

Military General Government of Lublin Generalne Gubernatorstwo Lubelskie (Polish) Generalgouvernement Lublin (German)
- 1915–1918
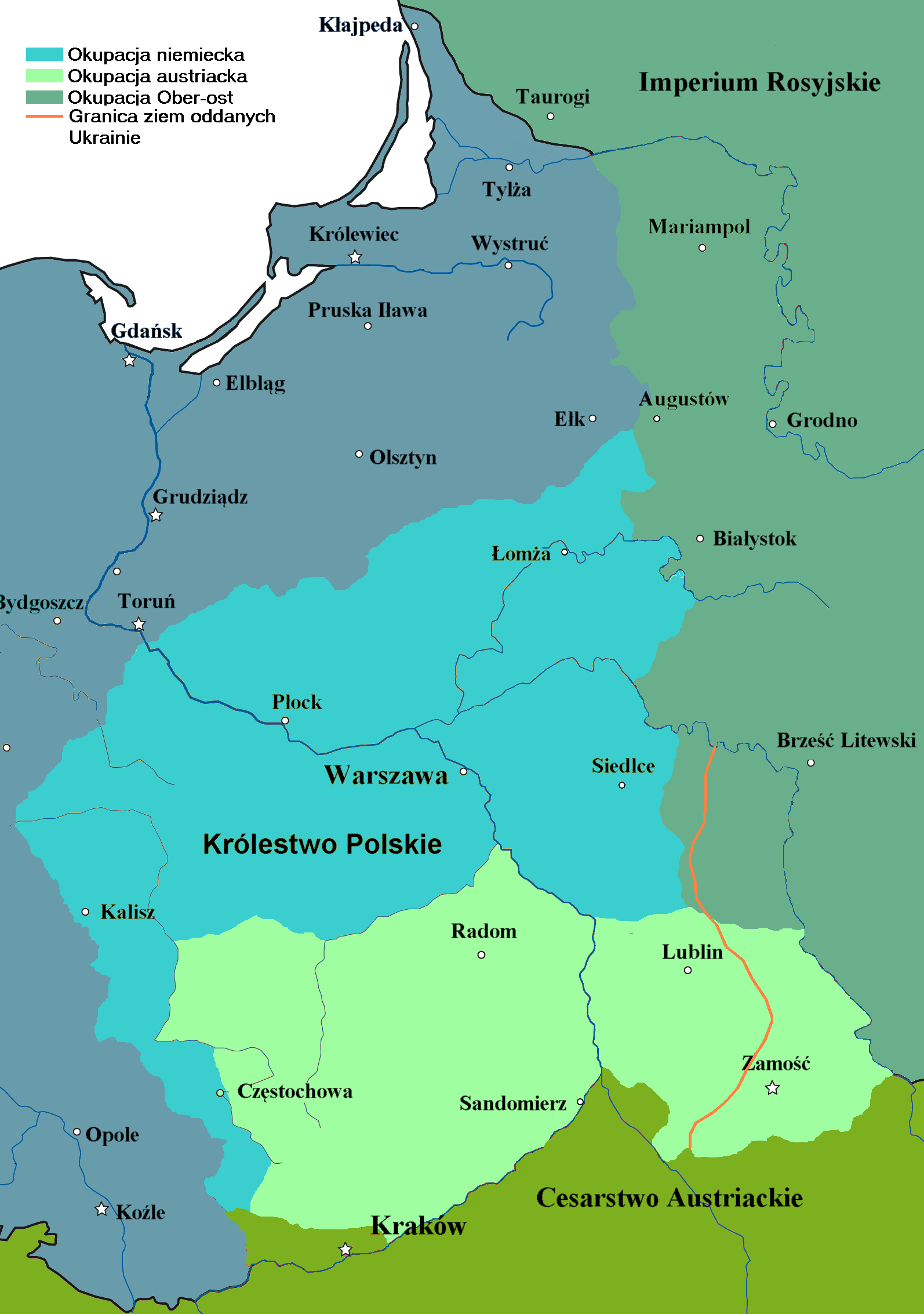
- The Military Government of Lublin, depicted in light green
- Capital: Kielce (1915); Lublin (1915–1917)
- Common languages: German, Polish
- Government: Occupation authority
- Governors-General
  - 1915–1916: Erich von Diller
  - 1916–1917: Karl Kuk
  - 1917–1918: Stanisław Szeptycki
  - 1918: Anton Lipošćak
- History
  - Established: 1 September 1915
  - Armistice, withdrawal of German forces: 3 November 1918
- Currency: Russian ruble, Austro-Hungarian krone
Preceded by	Succeeded by
Vistula Land	Second Polish Republic
- Today part of: Poland

The Military General Government of Poland, (Note: German: Militärgeneralgouvernement in Polen; Polish: Generalne Gubernatorstwo Wojskowe w Polsce) also known as the Military General Government of Lublin, (Note: German: Militärgeneralgouvernement Lublin; Polish: Generalne Gubernatorstwo Lubelskie) was a military administration of an area of the Russian Empire under the occupation of Austria-Hungary, during World War I, that existed from 1915 to 1917. Its seat of government was originally based in Kielce, but moved to Lublin in October 1915.

== History ==
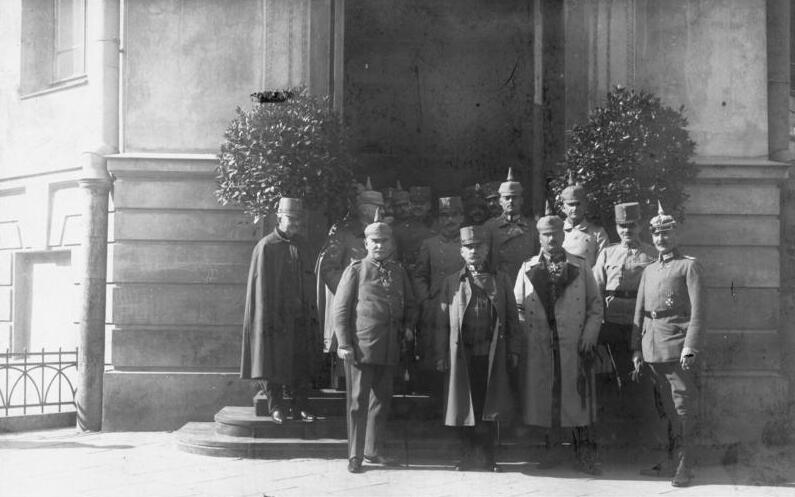
Governor-General of Warsaw Hans Hartwig von Beseler (1st left) with Governor-General of Lublin Karl Kuk (2nd left) in Lublin, 1916

On 25 August 1915, the Imperial and Royal Army formed the General Government of Kielce, renamed the General Government of Lublin on 1 October 1915. It covered the southern parts of Russian Poland. On 10 October 1916, the German Chancellor Theobald von Bethmann Hollweg demanded the dissolution of the Austrian General Government of Lublin and the creation of a joint administration with the German General Government of Warsaw. However, the Austro-Hungarian Foreign Minister Stephan Burián von Rajecz rejected the order. On 18 October 1916, an agreement was reached on the uniform legislation and administration of the General Governorates of Warsaw and Lublin. As a result of the proclamation of the Kingdom of Poland on 5 November 1916, the gradual transfer of administration to Poland was planned. Due to different ideas from the German and Austro-Hungarian sides regarding the future role of Poland and Polish independence efforts, the establishment of Polish state organs had stalled several times. It was only in the summer of 1917 that the first parts of the judiciary and the teaching system were released from the direct management of the occupation administration. Interventions by the Governor-General continued to take place.

== Governors-General ==
No.	Portrait	Name	Term	Notes
1		Major General; Freiherr Erich von Diller	October 1915 – May 1916	Governor-general based in Kielce from August to October 1915 and in Lublin for the remainder of his term.
2		General of the Artillery; Karl Kuk	May 1916 – April 1917	Along with his German counterpart, Governor-General of Warsaw Hans Hartwig von Beseler, he established a nominally independent Kingdom of Poland in December 1916. Removed from his post by Charles I of Austria.
3		Major General; Count Stanisław Szeptycki	April 1917 – February 1918	Resigned in protest of the transfer of the Chełm region to Ukraine as part of the Treaty of Brest-Litovsk (Ukraine–Central Powers).
4		General of the Infantry; Anton Lipošćak	March 1918 – November 1918	Notable for having saved the Piotrków Trybunalski Royal Castle from pillage by the Austro-Hungarian Army. He resigned from his post on 2 November 1918 following the dissolution of Austria-Hungary.

== See also ==
- Imperial German General Government of Belgium
- Government General of Warsaw

== Literature ==
- Gerhard Hirschfeld / Gerd Krumeich / Irina Renz (eds.): Encyclopedia First World War, keyword: "Generalgouvernement", Paderborn 2004, p. 524f.
- Stephan Lehnstaedt: The Military General Government of Lublin. The "utilisation" of Poland by Austria-Hungary in the First World War; Journal of East Central Europe Research, 2012, digitised (PDF; 0.6 MB)
