= Naftalan (Croatia) =

Geography
- Location: Ivanić-Grad in Zagreb County, Croatia
- Coordinates: 45°42′24″N 16°23′11″E

Organisation
- Type: Rehabilitation

Links
- Website: www.naftalan.hr
- Lists: Hospitals in Croatia

Naftalan is a spa resort and skin conditions treatment and rehabilitation hospital in Ivanić-Grad in Zagreb County, Croatia. It is located 27 km (17 mi) away from the city center of the country's capital Zagreb, a 20-minute drive on the A3 freeway.

== History ==
The hospital was opened in 1989 and sports 111 beds in rooms of up to three patients. Various amenities, such as a café, a bowling alley, and handball, football, and tennis courts, are available to patients.

The hospital is aimed at treating patients with psoriasis, atopic and contact dermatitis, and scleroderma. Naftalan is a member of the European Spas Association (ESPA).

== See also ==
- Birley Spa
