= Ivanić-Grad =

- Town
- Grad Ivanić-Grad; Town of Ivanić-Grad
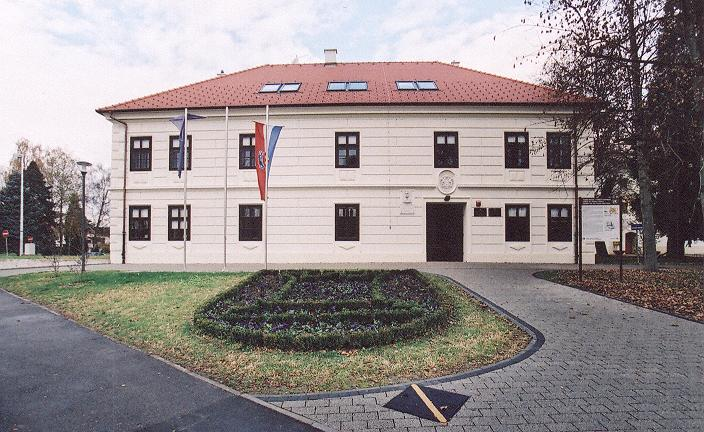
- Magistrate building in Ivanić-Grad
- Interactive map of Ivanić-Grad
- Location of Ivanić-Grad in Croatia
- Coordinates: 45.71°N 16.39°E
- Country: Croatia
- Region: Central Croatia (Moslavina)
- County: Zagreb County

Government
  - Mayor: Javor Bojan Leš (HDZ)

Area
  - Town: 173.5 km^{2} (67.0 sq mi)
  - Urban: 45.3 km^{2} (17.5 sq mi)

Population (2021)
  - Town: 12,982
  - Density: 74.82/km^{2} (193.8/sq mi)
  - Urban: 8,452
  - Urban density: 187/km^{2} (483/sq mi)
- Time zone: UTC+1 (CET)
  - Summer (DST): UTC+2 (CEST)
- Postal code: 10310
- Area code: 01
- Website: ivanic-grad.hr

Ivanić-Grad or Ivanić Grad (pronounced [ǐʋanitɕ ɡrâːd]) is a town in Zagreb County, Croatia.

== Geography ==
Ivanić-Grad is located south-east from Zagreb, connected:

- 25 km (16 mi) by highway A3 (Bregana-Zagreb-Ivanić-Grad-Slavonski Brod-Lipovac)
- 25 km (16 mi) by train on direction Zagreb - Slavonski Brod - Vinkovci.

It is on the border of Moslavina and Posavina.

== Population ==
In the 2011 census, the total population is 14,548, in the following settlements:

- Caginec, population 555
- Deanovec, population 536
- Derežani, population 246
- Graberje Ivanićko, population 664
- Greda Breška, population 156
- Ivanić-Grad, population 9,379
- Lepšić, population 46
- Lijevi Dubrovčak, population 351
- Opatinec, population 321
- Posavski Bregi, population 816
- Prečno, population 98
- Prerovec, population 98
- Šemovec Breški, population 85
- Šumećani, population 494
- Tarno, population 57
- Topolje, population 112
- Trebovec, population 347
- Zaklepica, population 88
- Zelina Breška, population 99

In the 2011 census, 97% of the population were Croats.

Town of Ivanić-Grad: Population trends 1857–2021
v

population	8401	8569	8794	10039	10701	11198	10724	10810	10168	10969	11274	12112	12859	13494	14723	14548	12982
	1857	1869	1880	1890	1900	1910	1921	1931	1948	1953	1961	1971	1981	1991	2001	2011	2021

Sources: Croatian Bureau of Statistics publications

== Administration ==
City government, court, police, health-service, post office are the part of infrastructure of Ivanić-Grad.

== Economy ==
Ivanić-Grad also has a well-known spa resort, Naftalan.

== History ==
Ivanić-Grad was a border post between the Habsburg monarchy and the Ottoman Empire. In Habsburg Latin sources, it was known as Iwanych.

Until 1918, Ivanić-Grad was part of the Austrian monarchy (Kingdom of Croatia-Slavonia after the compromise of 1867), in the Croatian Military Frontier.

== Notable people ==
- Juraj Krnjević was one of the principal leaders of the Croatian Peasant Party (HSS) wholly devoted to achieving Croatian democracy and freedom.
- Đuro Deželić, writer

In November 2024, a monument to Ven. Josip Lang (born in Lepšić) in the city park was unveiled.

== Education ==
There are 2 elementary schools (OŠ Stjepana Basaričeka and OŠ Đure Deželića) and a high school (SŠ Ivan Švear) in Ivanić-Grad.

OŠ Đure Deželića has the status of an international eco-school and has a green flag.
