= List of prime ministers of Poland =

This is a list of the prime ministers of Poland. The Prime Minister of Poland is both the leader of the cabinet of Poland and the head of government of the country.

== Prime Ministers of the Duchy of Warsaw (1807–1813) ==
Portrait	Name (Birth–Death)	Entered office	Left office	Monarch (Reign)
1	Stanisław Małachowski (1736–1809)	5 October 1807	14 December 1807	Duke Frederick Augustus I (1807–1813)
2	Ludwik Szymon Gutakowski (1738-1811)	14 December 1807	November 1808	Duke Frederick Augustus I (1807–1813)
3	Józef Poniatowski (1763–1813); Acting Prime Minister	November 1808	25 March 1809	Duke Frederick Augustus I (1807–1813)
4	Stanisław Kostka Potocki (1755–1821)	25 March 1809	May 1813	Duke Frederick Augustus I (1807–1813)

== Presidents of the Polish National Government (1830–1831) ==
Portrait	Name (Birth–Death)	Entered office	Left office
1	Prince; Adam Jerzy Czartoryski (1770–1861)	3 December 1830	15 August 1831
–	Józef Chłopicki (1771–1854) (dictator)	5 December 1830	17 January 1831
2	General; Jan Stefan Krukowiecki (1772–1850)	17 August 1831	7 September 1831
3	Bonawentura Niemojowski (1787–1835)	8 September 1831	23 September 1831
4	Jan Nepomucen Umiński (1778–1851)	23 September 1831	23 September 1831
5	Maciej Rybiński (1784–1874)	25 September 1831	9 October 1831

== Presidents of the National Government of the Republic of Poland (1846) ==
Portrait		Name (Birth–Death)	Entered office	Left office
–	Tyssowski	National Government of the Republic of Poland (triumvirate): Jan Tyssowski (President) (1811–1857); Ludwik Gorzkowski (1811–1857); Aleksander Grzegorzewski (1806–1855)	22 February 1846	24 February 1846
–		Jan Tyssowski (1811–1857) (dictator)	24 February 1846	3 March 1846

== President of the National Committee in Poznań (1848) ==
Portrait	Name (Birth–Death)	Entered office	Left office
1	Gustaw Potworowski (1800–1860)	20 March 1848	9 May 1848

== Presidents of the Polish National Government (1863–1864) ==
Portrait	Name (Birth–Death)	Entered office	Left office
1	Stefan Bobrowski (1840–1863)	21 January 1863	17 February 1863
–	Ludwik Mierosławski (1814–1878) (dictator)	17 February 1863	11 March 1863
–	Marian Langiewicz (1827–1887) (dictator)	11 March 1863	18 March 1863
2	Stefan Bobrowski (1840–1863)	21 March 1863	12 April 1863
3	Agaton Giller (1831–1887)	12 April 1863	23 May 1863
4	Franciszek Dobrowolski (1830–1896)	23 May 1863	9 June 1863
5	Piotr Kobylański (1823–1868)	9 June 1863	10 June 1863
6	Karol Majewski (1833–1897)	14 June 1863	17 September 1863
7	Franciszek Dobrowolski (1830–1896)	17 September 1863	17 October 1863
8	Romuald Traugutt (1826–1864) (dictator.)	17 October 1863	10 April 1864
–	Aleksander Waszkowski (1841–1865)	12 April 1864	19 December 1864
9	Bronisław Brzeziński (1837–1865)	20 April 1864	October 1864

== Prime Ministers of the Kingdom of Poland (1917–1918) ==
Colour key (for political parties):
National-Democratic Party
Party of the National Right
Independent

Portrait	Name (Birth–Death)	Entered office	Left office	Political party	Cabinet
1	Jan Kucharzewski (1876–1952)	26 November 1917	27 February 1918	Independent	Kucharzewski
–	Antoni Ponikowski (1878–1949)	27 February 1918	4 April 1918	National-Democratic Party	Ponikowski (provisional)
2	Jan Kanty Steczkowski (1862–1929)	4 April 1918	23 October 1918	Party of the National Right	Steczkowski
3	Józef Świeżyński (1868–1948)	23 October 1918	3 November 1918	National-Democratic Party	Świeżyński
–	Władysław Wróblewski (1875–1951)	3 November 1918	14 November 1918	Independent	Wróblewski (provisional)

== Prime Ministers of the People's Republic (1918) ==
Colour key (for political parties):
Polish Socialist Party

Portrait	Name (Birth–Death)	Entered office	Left office	Political party	Cabinet
1	Ignacy Daszyński (1866–1936)	7 November 1918	14 November 1918	Polish Socialist Party	Provisional People's Government of the Republic of Poland

Note: Until 11 November, Daszyński was Prime Minister in the Polish People's Republic, based at Lublin, in the territory occupied by Austrian troops. On 11 November, he was invited to form a national government but failed and resigned three days later.

== Prime Ministers of the Republic of Poland (1918–1939) ==
Colour key (for political parties):
Polish Socialist Party
National People's Union
Polish People's Party "Piast"
Popular National Union
Polish Christian Democratic Party
Party of the National Right
Nonpartisan Bloc for Cooperation with the Government
Independent

Portrait	Name (Birth–Death)	Tenure			Ministerial offices held as prime minister	Party	Government
Portrait	Name (Birth–Death)	Took office	Left office	Duration	Ministerial offices held as prime minister	Party	Government
	Jędrzej Moraczewski (1870–1944)	17 November 1918	16 January 1919	61 days	Minister of Communication (6 November 1918-29 December 1918)	Polish Socialist Party	Moraczewski (PPS–Piast–Wyzwolenie–PSL Lewica)
	Ignacy Jan Paderewski (1860–1941)	16 January 1919	9 November 1919	298 days	Minister of Foreign Affairs	Independent	Paderewski (ZLN–PPS–Wyzwolenie–SPN)
	Leopold Skulski (1878–1940)	13 November 1919	9 June 1920	210 days		National People's Union	Skulski (NZL-ZLN-Piast–Wyzwolenie–SPN–NPR)
	Władysław Grabski (1874–1938)	23 June 1920	24 July 1920	32 days	Minister of the Treasury	Popular National Union	Grabski I (Piast–ZLN–Wyzwolenie)
	Wincenty Witos (1874–1945)	24 July 1920	5 September 1921	1 year, 44 days		Polish People's Party "Piast"	Rząd Obrony Narodowej (Witos I) (Piast–ZLN–PPS–ChNSP–Wyzwolenie–SPN–NPR)
	Antoni Ponikowski (1878–1949)	19 September 1921	10 March 1922	261 days	Minister of Culture and Art; Minister of Public Enlightenment	Polish Christian Democratic Party	Ponikowski I (ChNSP–SPN)
	Antoni Ponikowski (1878–1949)	5 March 1922	6 June 1922	261 days		Polish Christian Democratic Party	Ponikowski II (ChNSP–SPN)
	Artur Śliwiński (1877–1953)	28 June 1922	7 July 1922	10 days		Independent	Śliwiński
	Julian Nowak (1865–1946)	31 July 1922	14 December 1922	137 days		Party of the National Right	Nowak (SPN)
	Władysław Sikorski (1881–1943)	16 December 1922	26 May 1923	162 days		Independent	Sikorski I
	Wincenty Witos (1874–1945)	28 May 1923	14 December 1923	201 days		Polish People's Party "Piast"	Witos II (ZLN–Piast–ChNSP)
	Władysław Grabski (1874–1938)	19 December 1923	14 November 1925	1 year, 332 days		Popular National Union; Christian Union of National Unity	Grabski II (ZLN–PSChD–PSL Wyzwolenie–SPN)
	Aleksander Skrzyński (1882–1931)	20 November 1925	5 May 1926	167 days		Party of the National Right	Skrzyński (ZLN–Piast–PSChD–PPS–NPR–SPN)
	Wincenty Witos (1874–1945)	10 May 1926	14 May 1926	4 days		Polish People's Party "Piast"	Witos III (ZLN–Piast–PSChD–NPR)
	Kazimierz Bartel (1882–1941)	15 May 1926	4 June 1926	138 days		Nonpartisan Bloc for Cooperation with the Government	Bartel I
	Kazimierz Bartel (1882–1941)	8 June 1926	24 September 1926	138 days	Minister of Iron Railways	Nonpartisan Bloc for Cooperation with the Government	Bartel II
	Kazimierz Bartel (1882–1941)	27 September 1926	30 September 1926	138 days		Nonpartisan Bloc for Cooperation with the Government	Bartel III
	Józef Piłsudski (1867–1935)	2 October 1926	27 June 1928	1 year, 270 days	Minister of Military Affairs	Independent	Piłsudski I
	Kazimierz Bartel (1882–1941)	28 June 1928	13 April 1929	288 days		Nonpartisan Bloc for Cooperation with the Government	Bartel IV
	Kazimierz Świtalski (1886–1962)	14 April 1929	7 December 1929	238 days		Nonpartisan Bloc for Cooperation with the Government	Świtalski
	Kazimierz Bartel (1882–1941)	29 December 1929	15 March 1930	77 days		Nonpartisan Bloc for Cooperation with the Government	Bartel V
	Walery Sławek (1879–1939)	29 March 1930	23 August 1930	148 days		Nonpartisan Bloc for Cooperation with the Government	Sławek I
	Józef Piłsudski (1867–1935)	25 August 1930	4 December 1930	102 days		Independent	Piłsudski II
	Walery Sławek (1879–1939)	5 December 1930	26 May 1931	173 days		Nonpartisan Bloc for Cooperation with the Government	Sławek II
	Aleksander Prystor (1874–1941)	28 May 1931	10 May 1933	1 year, 349 days		Nonpartisan Bloc for Cooperation with the Government	Prystor
	Janusz Jędrzejewicz (1885–1951)	10 May 1933	16 May 1934	1 year, 7 days	Minister of Public Enlightenment	Nonpartisan Bloc for Cooperation with the Government	Jędrzejewicz
	Leon Kozłowski (1892–1944)	16 May 1934	28 March 1935	317 days		Nonpartisan Bloc for Cooperation with the Government	Kozłowski
	Walery Sławek (1879–1939)	28 March 1935	14 October 1935	201 days		Nonpartisan Bloc for Cooperation with the Government	Sławek III
	Marian Zyndram-Kościałkowski (1892–1946)	13 October 1935	16 May 1936	217 days		Nonpartisan Bloc for Cooperation with the Government	Zyndram-Kościałkowski
	Felicjan Sławoj Składkowski (1885–1962)	16 May 1936	30 September 1939	3 years, 138 days	Minister of Internal Affairs	Camp of National Unity	Składkowski

== Prime Ministers of the Government of the Republic of Poland in Exile (1939–1990) ==
After the German conquest of Poland, a Polish government-in-exile was formed under the protection of France and Britain. The government was recognised by the United Kingdom and the United States until 5 July 1945, when the Western Allies accepted Joseph Stalin's communist government. By the end of 1946, the government-in-exile had lost recognition by all but a handful of independent nations. Despite this, it continued in London until the election of Lech Wałęsa as President of the Republic of Poland in December 1990.

Portrait	Name (Birth–Death)	Tenure			Ministerial offices held as prime minister	Party	Government
Portrait	Name (Birth–Death)	Took office	Left office	Duration	Ministerial offices held as prime minister	Party	Government
	Władysław Sikorski (1881–1943)	30 September 1939	19 July 1940	293 days	Minister of Justice (16 October 1939-19 July 1940); Minister of Military Affairs	Independent	Sikorski II
	August Zaleski (1883–1972)	19 July 1940	25 July 1940 (Note: Invited to form a government by the President, but failed to do so and resigned)	6 days		Independent	
	Władysław Sikorski (1881–1943)	25 July 1940	4 July 1943†	2 years, 344 days	Minister of Interior (25 July 1940-10 October 1940); Minister of Military Affairs (25 July 1940-26 August 1942)	Independent	Sikorski III
	Stanisław Mikołajczyk (1901–1966)	14 July 1943	24 November 1944	1 year, 133 days		People's Party	Mikołajczyk
	Tomasz Arciszewski (1877–1955)	29 November 1944	25 July 1945 (lost recognition by major Allied powers)	2 years, 215 days	Director of the Ministry of Labour and Welfare	Polish Socialist Party	Arciszewski
	Tomasz Arciszewski (1877–1955)	29 November 1944	2 July 1947	2 years, 215 days	Director of the Ministry of Labour and Welfare	Polish Socialist Party	Arciszewski
	Tadeusz Bór-Komorowski (1895–1966)	2 July 1947	10 February 1949	1 year, 223 days	Director of the Ministry of Industry, Trade and Sail; Director of the Ministry of Labour and Welfare; Director of the Ministry of the Treasury	Independent	Komorowski
	Tadeusz Tomaszewski (1881–1950)	7 April 1949	10 August 1950†	1 year, 125 days	Director of the Ministry of Justice; Director of the Ministry of the Treasury	Union of Polish Socialists in Exile	Tomaszewski
	Roman Odzierzyński (1892–1975)	11 August 1950 (Acting)	25 August 1950	3 years, 151 days	Director of the Ministry of Justice; Director of the Ministry of National Defence	Independent	Tomaszewski
	Roman Odzierzyński (1892–1975)	25 August 1950	8 December 1953	3 years, 151 days	Director of the Ministry of Justice; Minister of National Defence; Director of the Ministry of the Treasury (21 January 1952-8 December 1953)	Independent	Odzierzyński
	Jerzy Hryniewski (1895–1978)	18 January 1954	13 May 1954	115 days		Polish Independence League	Hryniewski
	Stanisław Cat-Mackiewicz (1896–1966)	8 June 1954	21 June 1955	1 year, 332 days	Director of the Ministry of Foreign Affairs	Independent	Mackiewicz
	Hugon Hanke (1904–1964)	8 August 1955	11 September 1955 (defected to the Polish People's Republic)	34 days		Labour Faction	Hanke
	Antoni Pająk (1893–1965)	12 September 1955	28 March 1957	9 years, 275 days	Minister of the Treasury	Polish Socialist Party	Pająk I
	Antoni Pająk (1893–1965)	15 April 1957	26 September 1963	9 years, 275 days	Minister of the Treasury	Polish Socialist Party	Pająk II
	Antoni Pająk (1893–1965)	9 October 1963	14 June 1965	9 years, 275 days		Polish Socialist Party	Pająk III
	Aleksander Zawisza (1896–1977)	25 June 1965	9 June 1970	4 years, 349 days	Minister of Foreign Affairs	Independent	Zawisza
	Zygmunt Muchniewski (1896–1979)	20 July 1970	14 July 1972	1 year, 360 days		Labour Faction	Muchniewski
	Alfred Urbański (1899–1983)	18 July 1972	15 December 1973	3 years, 363 days	Minister of Interior	Polish Socialist Party	Urbański I
	Alfred Urbański (1899–1983)	17 January 1974	15 July 1976	3 years, 363 days	Minister of the Treasury	Polish Socialist Party	Urbański II
	Kazimierz Sabbat (1913–1989)	5 August 1976	12 June 1978	9 years, 246 days	Minister of Justice; Minister of National Affairs	Independent	Sabbat I
	Kazimierz Sabbat (1913–1989)	12 July 1978	9 April 1979	9 years, 246 days		Independent	Sabbat II
	Kazimierz Sabbat (1913–1989)	20 July 1979	17 December 1983	9 years, 246 days	Minister of Foreign Affairs	Independent	Sabbat III
	Kazimierz Sabbat (1913–1989)	17 January 1984	8 April 1986	9 years, 246 days	Minister of Foreign Affairs	Independent	Sabbat IV
	Edward Szczepanik (1915–2005)	8 April 1986	1 November 1989	4 years, 258 days		Independent	Szczepanik I
	Edward Szczepanik (1915–2005)	1 November 1989	20 December 1990	4 years, 258 days		Independent	Szczepanik II

=== Chairmen of the Executive for National Unity (1954–1972) ===
In 1954, one group within the government-in-exile opposed the continuation of August Zaleski as President of the government-in-exile beyond the end of his seven-year term. They established the Council of National Unity, vested the powers of the President in the Rada Trzech (three-man council), and appointed their own government, the Executive for National Unity. After the death of Zaleski in 1972, the Council of National Unity dissolved and ceded its powers to Zaleski's successor Stanisław Ostrowski.

- Roman Odzierzyński (1954–1955)
- Adam Ciołkosz (1956–1959)
- Witold Czerwiński (1959–1963)
- Adam Ciołkosz (1963 – December 1966)
- Jan Starzewski (December 1966 – 1967)
- Kazimierz Sabbat (1967 – 8 July 1972)

== Prime Ministers of the Polish People's Republic (1944–1989) ==
Colour key (for political parties):
Polish Socialist Party
Polish United Workers' Party
Solidarity Citizens' Committee

Portrait	Name (Birth–Death)	Entered office	Left office	Political party	Cabinet
1	Edward Osóbka-Morawski (1909–1997)	22 July 1944	31 December 1944	Polish Socialist Party	Polish Committee of National Liberation
1	Edward Osóbka-Morawski (1909–1997)	31 December 1944	28 June 1945	Polish Socialist Party	Provisional Government of the Republic of Poland
1	Edward Osóbka-Morawski (1909–1997)	28 June 1945	6 February 1947	Polish Socialist Party	Provisional Government of National Unity
2	Józef Cyrankiewicz (1911–1989)	6 February 1947	20 November 1952	Polish Socialist Party	Cyrankiewicz I
2	Józef Cyrankiewicz (1911–1989)	6 February 1947	20 November 1952	Polish United Workers' Party (from December 1948)	Cyrankiewicz I
3	Bolesław Bierut (1892–1956)	20 November 1952	18 March 1954	Polish United Workers' Party	Bierut
(2)	Józef Cyrankiewicz (1911–1989)	18 March 1954	15 May 1961	Polish United Workers' Party	Cyrankiewicz II
(2)	Józef Cyrankiewicz (1911–1989)	18 May 1961	24 June 1965	Polish United Workers' Party	Cyrankiewicz III
(2)	Józef Cyrankiewicz (1911–1989)	25 June 1965	27 June 1969	Polish United Workers' Party	Cyrankiewicz IV
(2)	Józef Cyrankiewicz (1911–1989)	28 June 1969	23 December 1970	Polish United Workers' Party	Cyrankiewicz V
4	Piotr Jaroszewicz (1909–1992)	23 December 1970	28 March 1972	Polish United Workers' Party	(Cyrankiewicz V)
4	Piotr Jaroszewicz (1909–1992)	28 March 1972	25 March 1976	Polish United Workers' Party	Jaroszewicz I
4	Piotr Jaroszewicz (1909–1992)	27 March 1976	18 February 1980	Polish United Workers' Party	Jaroszewicz II
5	Edward Babiuch (1927–2021)	18 February 1980	24 August 1980	Polish United Workers' Party	Babiuch
6	Józef Pińkowski (1929–2000)	24 August 1980	11 February 1981	Polish United Workers' Party	Pińkowski
7	Wojciech Jaruzelski (1923–2014)	11 February 1981	6 November 1985	Polish United Workers' Party	Jaruzelski
8	Zbigniew Messner (1929–2014)	6 November 1985	27 September 1988	Polish United Workers' Party	Messner
9	Mieczysław Rakowski (1926–2008)	27 September 1988	2 August 1989	Polish United Workers' Party	Rakowski
10	Czesław Kiszczak (1925–2015) (lost vote of confidence)	2 August 1989	24 August 1989	Polish United Workers' Party	Kiszczak
11	Tadeusz Mazowiecki (1927–2013) (during democratic transition)	24 August 1989	31 December 1989 (People's Republic abolished.)	Solidarity Citizens' Committee	Mazowiecki

== Prime Ministers of the Republic of Poland (1989–present) ==
Political parties

Social Democrats

Social Democracy / Democratic Left Alliance (4)

Liberals

Solidarity Citizens' Committee (1)
Democratic Union (1)
Liberal Democratic Congress (1)
Civic Platform / Civic Coalition (2)

Christian Democrats

Polish People's Party (1)
Solidarity Electoral Action (1)

Conservatives

Centre Agreement / Law and Justice (5)

Portrait	Name Sejm District (Birth–Death)	Tenure			Ministerial offices held as prime minister	Party	Government	Sejm (Election)	President (Term)	
Portrait	Name Sejm District (Birth–Death)	Took office	Left office	Duration	Ministerial offices held as prime minister	Party	Government	Sejm (Election)	President (Term)	
	Tadeusz Mazowiecki; None (1927–2013)	24 August 1989	4 January 1991	1 year, 134 days	–	Solidarity Citizens' Committee	Mazowiecki; B: (KO‘S'–ZSL–PZPR–SD) E: (KO‘S'–UD–PSL–SD–ROAD–FPD)	Contract (1989)	1	President; Wojciech Jaruzelski (1989–1990)
	Tadeusz Mazowiecki; None (1927–2013)	24 August 1989	4 January 1991	1 year, 134 days	–	Democratic Union	Mazowiecki; B: (KO‘S'–ZSL–PZPR–SD) E: (KO‘S'–UD–PSL–SD–ROAD–FPD)	Contract (1989)	1	President; Wojciech Jaruzelski (1989–1990)
	Tadeusz Mazowiecki; None (1927–2013)	24 August 1989	4 January 1991	1 year, 134 days	–	Democratic Union	Mazowiecki; B: (KO‘S'–ZSL–PZPR–SD) E: (KO‘S'–UD–PSL–SD–ROAD–FPD)	Contract (1989)	2	President; Lech Wałęsa (1990–1995)
	Jan Krzysztof Bielecki; Gdańsk - 21 (born 1951)	4 January 1991	6 December 1991	337 days	–	Liberal Democratic Congress	Bielecki (KLD–ZChN–PC–SD)	Contract (1989)	2	President; Lech Wałęsa (1990–1995)
	Jan Olszewski; Warsaw - 17 (1930–2019)	6 December 1991	5 June 1992 (no confidence vote)	183 days	–	Centre Agreement	Olszewski (PC–ZChN–PSL-PL)	I (1991)	2	President; Lech Wałęsa (1990–1995)
	Waldemar Pawlak; Płock - 3 (born 1959)	5 June 1992	11 July 1992	37 days	–	Polish People's Party	Pawlak I	I (1991)	2	President; Lech Wałęsa (1990–1995)
	Hanna Suchocka; Poznań - 18 (born 1946)	11 July 1992	26 October 1993	1 year, 108 days	–	Democratic Union	Suchocka (UD–KLD–ZChN–PChD– PPPP–PSL-PL)	I (1991)	2	President; Lech Wałęsa (1990–1995)
	Waldemar Pawlak; Płock - 34 (born 1959)	26 October 1993	7 March 1995	1 year, 133 days	–	Polish People's Party	Pawlak II (SLD–PSL–BBWR)	II (1993)	2	President; Lech Wałęsa (1990–1995)
	Józef Oleksy; Siedlce - 39 (1946–2015)	7 March 1995	7 February 1996	338 days	–	Social Democracy	Oleksy (SLD–PSL)	II (1993)	2	President; Lech Wałęsa (1990–1995)
	Józef Oleksy; Siedlce - 39 (1946–2015)	7 March 1995	7 February 1996	338 days	–	Social Democracy	Oleksy (SLD–PSL)	II (1993)	3	President; Aleksander Kwaśniewski (1995–2005)
	Włodzimierz Cimoszewicz; Białystok - 4 (born 1950)	7 February 1996	31 October 1997	1 year, 267 days	Chairman of the European Integration Committee (1996–1997)	Social Democracy	Cimoszewicz (SLD–PSL)	II (1993)	3	President; Aleksander Kwaśniewski (1995–2005)
	Jerzy Buzek; Gliwice - 17 (born 1940)	31 October 1997	19 October 2001	3 years, 354 days	Chairman of the European Integration Committee (1998–2001)	Solidarity Electoral Action	Buzek (AWS–UW) (Note: UW left the Buzek cabinet on 8 June 2000.)	III (1997)	3	President; Aleksander Kwaśniewski (1995–2005)
	Leszek Miller; Łódź - 9 (born 1946)	19 October 2001	2 May 2004	2 years, 197 days	Chairman of the European Integration Committee	Democratic Left Alliance	Miller (SLD–UP–PSL) (Note: PSL left the Miller cabinet on 3 March 2003.)	IV (2001)	3	President; Aleksander Kwaśniewski (1995–2005)
	Marek Belka; None (born 1952)	2 May 2004	11 June 2004 (no confidence vote)	1 year, 183 days	Chairman of the European Integration Committee; Minister of Sport (2005)	Democratic Left Alliance	Belka I (SLD–UP)	IV (2001)	3	President; Aleksander Kwaśniewski (1995–2005)
	Marek Belka; None (born 1952)	11 June 2004	31 October 2005	1 year, 183 days	Chairman of the European Integration Committee; Minister of Sport (2005)	Democratic Left Alliance	Belka II (SLD–UP–SDPL)	IV (2001)	3	President; Aleksander Kwaśniewski (1995–2005)
	Kazimierz Marcinkiewicz; Zielona Góra - 8 (born 1959)	31 October 2005	14 July 2006	257 days	Chairman of the European Integration Committee (2006)	Law and Justice	Marcinkiewicz (PiS–SRP–LPR) (Note: SRP and LPR joined the Marcinkiewicz Cabinet on 5 May 2006.)	V (2005)	3	President; Aleksander Kwaśniewski (1995–2005)
	Kazimierz Marcinkiewicz; Zielona Góra - 8 (born 1959)	31 October 2005	14 July 2006	257 days	Chairman of the European Integration Committee (2006)	Law and Justice	Marcinkiewicz (PiS–SRP–LPR)	V (2005)	4	President; Lech Kaczyński (2005–2010)
	Jarosław Kaczyński; Warsaw - 19 (born 1949)	14 July 2006	16 November 2007	1 year, 126 days	–	Law and Justice	Kaczyński (PiS–SRP–LPR) (Note: SRP and LPR left the Kaczyński Cabinet on 13 August 2007.)	V (2005)	4	President; Lech Kaczyński (2005–2010)
	Donald Tusk; Warsaw - 19 (born 1957)	16 November 2007	18 November 2011	6 years, 311 days	Chairman of the European Integration Committee (2007–2009)	Civic Platform	Tusk I (PO–PSL)	VI (2007)	4	President; Lech Kaczyński (2005–2010)
	Donald Tusk; Warsaw - 19 (born 1957)	16 November 2007	18 November 2011	6 years, 311 days	Chairman of the European Integration Committee (2007–2009)	Civic Platform	Tusk I (PO–PSL)	VI (2007)	5	President; Bronisław Komorowski (2010–2015)
	Donald Tusk; Warsaw - 19 (born 1957)	18 November 2011	22 September 2014	6 years, 311 days	Chairman of the European Integration Committee (2007–2009)	Civic Platform	Tusk II (PO–PSL)	VII (2011)	5	President; Bronisław Komorowski (2010–2015)
	Ewa Kopacz; Radom - 17 (born 1956)	22 September 2014	16 November 2015	1 year, 56 days	–	Civic Platform	Kopacz (PO–PSL)	VII (2011)	5	President; Bronisław Komorowski (2010–2015)
	Ewa Kopacz; Radom - 17 (born 1956)	22 September 2014	16 November 2015	1 year, 56 days	–	Civic Platform	Kopacz (PO–PSL)	VII (2011)	6	President; Andrzej Duda (2015–2025)
	Beata Szydło; Chrzanów - 12 (born 1963)	16 November 2015	11 December 2017	2 years, 26 days	–	Law and Justice	Szydło	VIII (2015)	6	President; Andrzej Duda (2015–2025)
	Mateusz Morawiecki; None (until 2019); Katowice II - 31 (from 2019) (born 1968)	11 December 2017	15 November 2019	6 years, 3 days	Minister of Development (2017–2018), Finance (2017–2018), Sport (2019), Digital Affairs (2020–2023)	Law and Justice	Morawiecki I	VIII (2015)	6	President; Andrzej Duda (2015–2025)
	Mateusz Morawiecki; None (until 2019); Katowice II - 31 (from 2019) (born 1968)	15 November 2019	27 November 2023	6 years, 3 days	Minister of Development (2017–2018), Finance (2017–2018), Sport (2019), Digital Affairs (2020–2023)	Law and Justice	Morawiecki II	IX (2019)	6	President; Andrzej Duda (2015–2025)
	Mateusz Morawiecki; None (until 2019); Katowice II - 31 (from 2019) (born 1968)	27 November 2023	13 December 2023 (no confidence vote)	6 years, 3 days	Minister of Development (2017–2018), Finance (2017–2018), Sport (2019), Digital Affairs (2020–2023)	Law and Justice	Morawiecki III	X (2023)	6	President; Andrzej Duda (2015–2025)
	Donald Tusk; Warsaw - 19 (born 1957)	13 December 2023	Incumbent	2 years, 321 days	–	Civic Platform	Tusk III (KO–KP–PL2050–NL)	X (2023)	6	President; Andrzej Duda (2015–2025)
	Donald Tusk; Warsaw - 19 (born 1957)	13 December 2023	Incumbent	2 years, 321 days	–	Civic Platform	Tusk III (KO–KP–PL2050–NL)	X (2023)	7	President; Karol Nawrocki (2025–present)
	Donald Tusk; Warsaw - 19 (born 1957)	13 December 2023	Incumbent	2 years, 321 days	–	Civic Coalition	Tusk III (KO–KP–PL2050–NL)	X (2023)	7	President; Karol Nawrocki (2025–present)

== See also ==
- List of heads of state of Poland
- List of Polish monarchs
- President of Poland
