= Polish governments and their composition =

The following is a list of Cabinets of Poland.

== Kingdom of Poland and Polish-Lithuanian Commonwealth (966-1795) ==
- See list of kings of Poland for heads of state. In the late 18th century, a first proto-government in the modern sense was created in Poland; the Permanent Council.

== Cabinets of Duchy of Warsaw (1807-1813) ==
- Government Commission of Stanisław Małachowski
- Cabinet of Stanisław Małachowski
- Cabinet of Ludwik Szymon Gutakowski
- Cabinet of Stanisław Kostka Potocki

== Cabinets of Kingdom of Poland (1916-1918) ==
- Cabinet of Jan Kucharzewski
- Cabinet of Antoni Ponikowski
- Cabinet of Jan Kanty Steczkowski
- Cabinet of Józef Świeżyński
- Cabinet of Władysław Wróblewski

== Cabinet of Second Polish Republic (1918-1939) ==
- Cabinet of Ignacy Daszyński
- Cabinet of Jędrzej Moraczewski
- Cabinet of Ignacy Jan Paderewski
- Cabinet of Leopold Skulski
- First Cabinet of Władysław Grabski
- First Cabinet of Wincenty Witos
- First Cabinet of Antoni Ponikowski
- Second Cabinet of Antoni Ponikowski
- Cabinet of Artur Śliwiński
- Cabinet of Julian Ignacy Nowak
- First Cabinet of Władysław Sikorski
- Second Cabinet of Wincenty Witos
- Second Cabinet of Władysław Grabski
- Cabinet of Aleksander Skrzyński
- Third Cabinet of Wincenty Witos
- First Cabinet of Kazimierz Bartel
- Second Cabinet of Kazimierz Bartel
- Third Cabinet of Kazimierz Bartel
- First Cabinet of Józef Piłsudski
- Fourth Cabinet of Kazimierz Bartel
- Cabinet of Kazimierza Świtalskiego
- Fifth Cabinet of Kazimierz Bartel
- First Cabinet of Walery Sławek
- Second Cabinet of Józef Piłsudski
- Second Cabinet of Walery Sławek
- Cabinet of Aleksander Prystor
- Cabinet of Janusz Jędrzejewicz
- Cabinet of Leon Kozłowski
- Third Cabinet of Walery Sławek
- Cabinet of Marian Zyndram-Kościałkowski
- Cabinet of Felicjan Sławój-Składkowski

== Cabinets of Polish government in Exile (1939-1990) ==
- Second Cabinet of Władysław Sikorski
- Third Cabinet of Władysław Sikorski
- Cabinet of Stanisław Mikołajczyk
- Cabinet of Tomasz Arciszewski
- Cabinet of Tadeusz Komorowski
- Cabinet of Tadeusz Tomaszewski
- Cabinet of Roman Odzierzyński
- Cabinet of Jerzy Hryniewski
- Cabinet of Stanisław Mackiewicz
- Cabinet of Hugon Hanke
- First Cabinet of Antoni Pająk
- Second Cabinet of Antoni Pająk
- First Cabinet of Aleksander Zawisza
- Second Cabinet of Aleksander Zawisza
- Third Cabinet of Aleksander Zawisza
- Cabinet of Zygmunt Muchniewski
- First Cabinet of Alfred Urbański
- Second Cabinet of Alfred Urbański
- First Cabinet of Kazimierz Sabbat
- Second Cabinet of Kazimierz Sabbat
- Third Cabinet of Kazimierz Sabbat
- Fourth Cabinet of Kazimierz Sabbat
- First Cabinet of Edward Szczepanik
- Second Cabinet of Edward Szczepanik

== Cabinets of Free Poland in Exile (1972-1990) ==
Alternative government-in-exile, created by Juliusz Nowina-Sokolnicki

- Cabinet of Sergiusz Ursyn-Szantyr
- Cabinet of Zenon Janasiak
- Cabinet of Ryszard Jóżef Zawisza
- Cabinet of Stanisław Zięba
- Cabinet of Jan Zygmunt Sobolewski
- Cabinet of Jan Libront
- Cabinet of Jan Alfred Chanerley-Łokcikowski

== Cabinets of Polish Republic (1944-1952) ==
- Polski Komitet Wyzwolenia Narodowego
- Rząd Tymczasowy Rzeczypospolitej Polskiej
- Tymczasowy Rząd Jedności Narodowej
- First Cabinet of Józef Cyrankiewicz

== Cabinets People's Republic of Poland (1952-1989) ==
- Cabinet of Bolesław Bierut
- Second Cabinet of Józef Cyrankiewicz
- Third Cabinet of Józef Cyrankiewicz
- Fourth Cabinet of Józef Cyrankiewicz
- Fifth Cabinet of Józef Cyrankiewicz
- First Cabinet of Piotr Jaroszewicz
- Second Cabinet of Piotr Jaroszewicz
- Cabinet of Edward Babiuch
- Cabinet of Józef Pińkowski
- Cabinet of Wojciech Jaruzelski
- Cabinet of Zbigniew Messner
- Cabinet of Mieczysław Rakowski
- Cabinet of Czesław Kiszczak

== Cabinets Third Polish Republic (1989-) ==
- Cabinet of Tadeusz Mazowiecki
- Cabinet of Jan Krzysztof Bielecki
- Cabinet of Jan Olszewski
- First Cabinet of Waldemar Pawlak
- Cabinet of Hanna Suchocka
- Second Cabinet of Waldemar Pawlak
- Cabinet of Józef Oleksy
- Cabinet of Włodzimierz Cimoszewicz
- Cabinet of Jerzy Buzek
- Cabinet of Leszek Miller
- First Cabinet of Marek Belka
- Second Cabinet of Marek Belka
- Cabinet of Kazimierz Marcinkiewicz
- Cabinet of Jarosław Kaczyński
- First Cabinet of Donald Tusk
- Second Cabinet of Donald Tusk
- Cabinet of Ewa Kopacz
- Cabinet of Beata Szydło
- First Cabinet of Mateusz Morawiecki
- Second Cabinet of Mateusz Morawiecki
- Third Cabinet of Mateusz Morawiecki
- Third Cabinet of Donald Tusk

== See also ==
- Prime Minister of the Republic of Poland
