= Stanisław Sylwester Alfonzy Grodyński =

Polish Starosta and Military Officer (WWI & WWII)

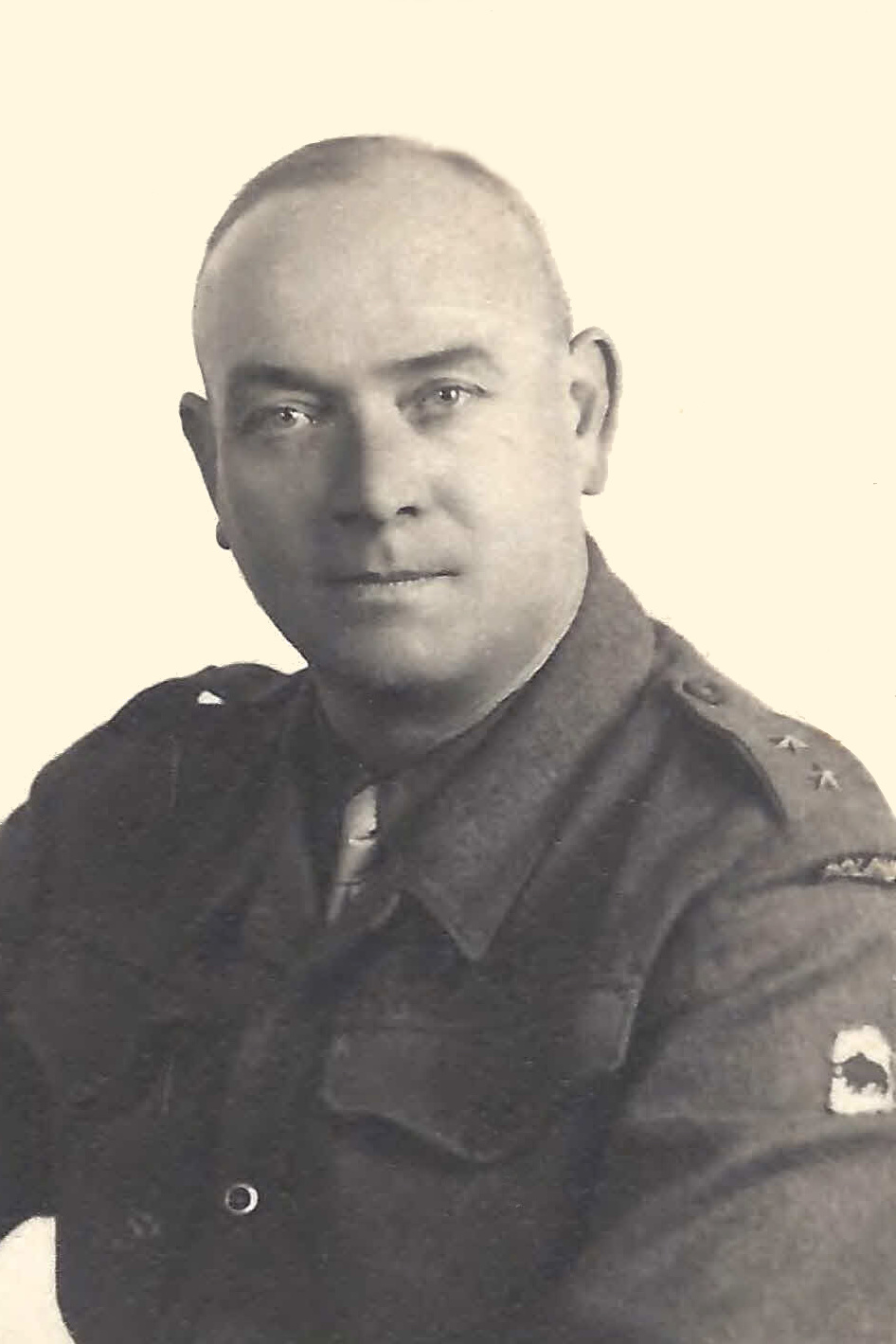

Decorated Starosta Polish Military Intelligence Officer

Personal details
- Born: Stanisław Kusionowicz; 4 November 1898 Jabłonków, Austrian Silesia
- Died: 27 August 1971 (aged 72) London, England
- Spouse: Halina Bulczyńska Grodyńska
- Children: Andrzej, Marjan
- Education: Kraków & Poznań Universities (Faculties Law\Administration)
- Awards: . . . . . . . Gold Cross of Merit < military honours list >

Stanisław Sylwester Alfonzy Grodyński (born Stanisław Sylwester Alfonzy Kusionowicz; 4 November 1898 – 27 August 1971) – Polish soldier, lawyer, local government administrator and senior military intelligence adviser\officer.

== Early life ==
On 7 September 1906 Stanisław's father, Andrzej Kusionowicz Grodyński, a circuit judge in Polish Silesia, changed the family surname from Kusionowicz to Grodyński. Following his father's marriage to Alicja Matter on 3 June 1896, Stanisław was born on 4 November 1898 in Jabłonków (now Jablunkov in the Czech Republic) in the Trans-Olza region (at that time occupied by Austria). As a young boy he moved with his parents to Strumień in the Cieszyn District of Silesia, and after the family moved to the town of Cieszyn, Stanisław Grodyński (following the change of surname) lived with his parents in Bielska street (formerly Bielitzerstrasse).

At age seventeen Grodyński was conscripted into the Austrian Army in May 1916 he began military training as a rifleman in 100 Reserve Battalion of the Infantry Regiment. His next assignment was the Officers School in Opava and after several months he was promoted to the rank of Corporal. In November of that year Grodyński was assigned to 12 Storming Battalion with which he fought in Russia and later he also fought at the Italian front. He was shortly promoted to Sergeant then several months later to Ensign. In January 1918 he was promoted to the rank of Second Lieutenant in the same battalion. On the Italian Front, he was wounded in the neck by shrapnel from a hand-grenade. After leaving the hospital, he was assigned as Adjutant at the military hospital in Bielsko-Biała.

On 12 January 1921, after five years of military service, Grodyński transferred to the 'reserve' as a 'civilian'. After embarking on law studies at the Jagiellonian University, in Kraków, he completed his studies on 25 July 1923 at the Adam Mickiewicz University, in Poznań.

== Career ==
He worked in the Ministry of the Interior in Warsaw. Following his marriage to Halina Bulczyńska he took up a new position in Poznań (Wielkopolska) and after the birth of his first son "Andrzej" on 28 November 1922, Grodyński was posted to Kobryń (now in Belarus) in Polesie. After a temporary assignment in Brest he returned to take up the post of 'Vice-Starost' (Deputy Head of Provincial Government). Grodyński's second son, "Marjan", was born in Kobryń on 3 July 1925 and following his appointment as 'Poviat Starost' (Province Governor) he and his young family moved to Sarny (now in Ukraine) in Wołyń. (Aged only 28 he reputedly became Poland's youngest 'Starost'.) During this period he was visited by friends Józef Werobej and Count Stefan Tyszkiewicz, both of whom also later served under General Anders during WW II.

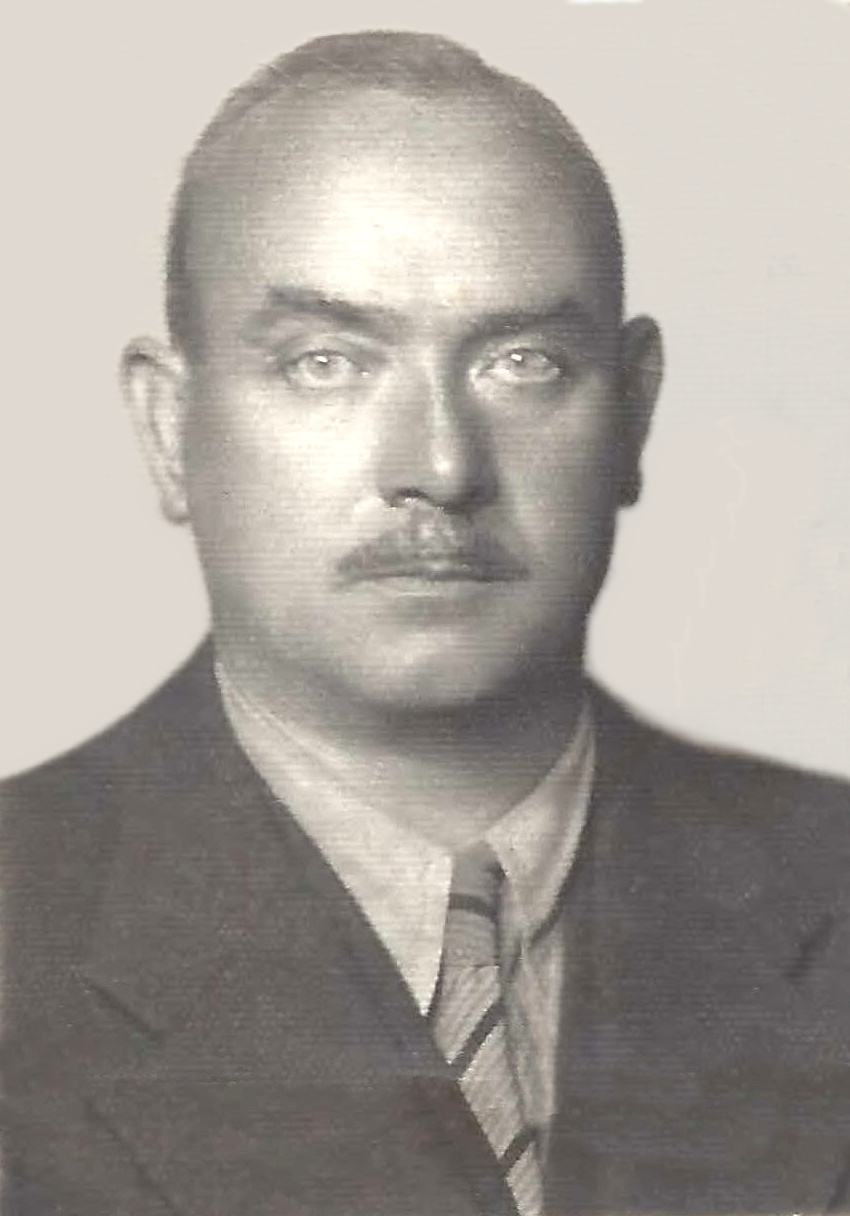
Grodyński in 1939 before his exile to Siberia

Following further appointments as Governor of Świecie, Toruń, Ivano-Frankivsk and Kalush (now in Ukraine), in 1937 Grodyński was reassigned to the post of Province\City Governor of Grudziądz, in the politically and militarily strategic region of Pomorze. In this nationally important post he worked closely with judges and military commanders, including General Michał Karaszewicz-Tokarzewski and Marshal Edward Rydz-Śmigły, and worked under Raczkiewicz, the Pomeranian Governor who became 'President-in-Exile' (1939–47). In recognition of his work Grodyński was decorated with the Gold Cross of Merit (Poland's then highest civilian award) shortly before the outbreak of war.

== World War II ==
On 1 September 1939, shortly after military operations commenced, Grodyński with his family drove to the railway station in Grudziądz to reach an evacuation point near Lublin. Following news that the Polish Army was withdrawing from the western part of the country, Grodyński moved to the Polish-Russian border and made for the city of Lwów where he and his wife and sons were suddenly arrested and deported to a Soviet forced labour camp near the town of Aldan in the Autonomous Soviet Socialist Republic of Yakutsk.

In 1941, following the signing of the Polish-Russian Military Agreement (30 July) which granted amnesty to all those surviving in Soviet Russia, Grodyński immediately requested to meet with the NKWD authorities in Ałdan. On reaching Buzułuk (pl) Grodyński and his family were assigned to different branches of the military and he then parted from his family to re-commence serving in the ranks of the Polish Army.

After a two-week 'working visit' to Moscow, on 25 October Grodyński was assigned to the 6th Polish Army Infantry Division which was being formed in the town of Totskoye in Kazakhstan. The commander of the division was Brigadier General Michał Karaszewicz-Tokarzewski. On 1 November, Grodyński was appointed Commander of the Headquarters' Platoon, the 17th Infantry Regiment, which he led for nine months. The Commander of the Polish Army in the Soviet Union, General Władysław Anders, visited this division four times, including the occasion he accompanied General Sikorski during his official visit to Russia in December 1941. After a few months Grodyński left with 17th Headquarters' Platoon to the vicinity of Shahrisabz in Uzbekistan. In August 1942 this division left Russia by ships from the port of Turkmenbashi (in the Krasnovodsk Gulf of Turkmenistan) on the Caspian Sea to the port of Pahlewi in Persia (now Bandar-e Anzali in Iran). Grodyński continued his military service in Persia, where the Polish Army was transferred under the command of the British. A few months later the entire 6th Division was transported through Hamadan to the territory of Iraq, where all the military units were deployed in the vicinity of the towns of Khanaqin, Quizil-Ribat and Kirkuk. From 18 November to 30 December 1942 Grodyński continued his military service in Iraq as an Officer in Army HQ.

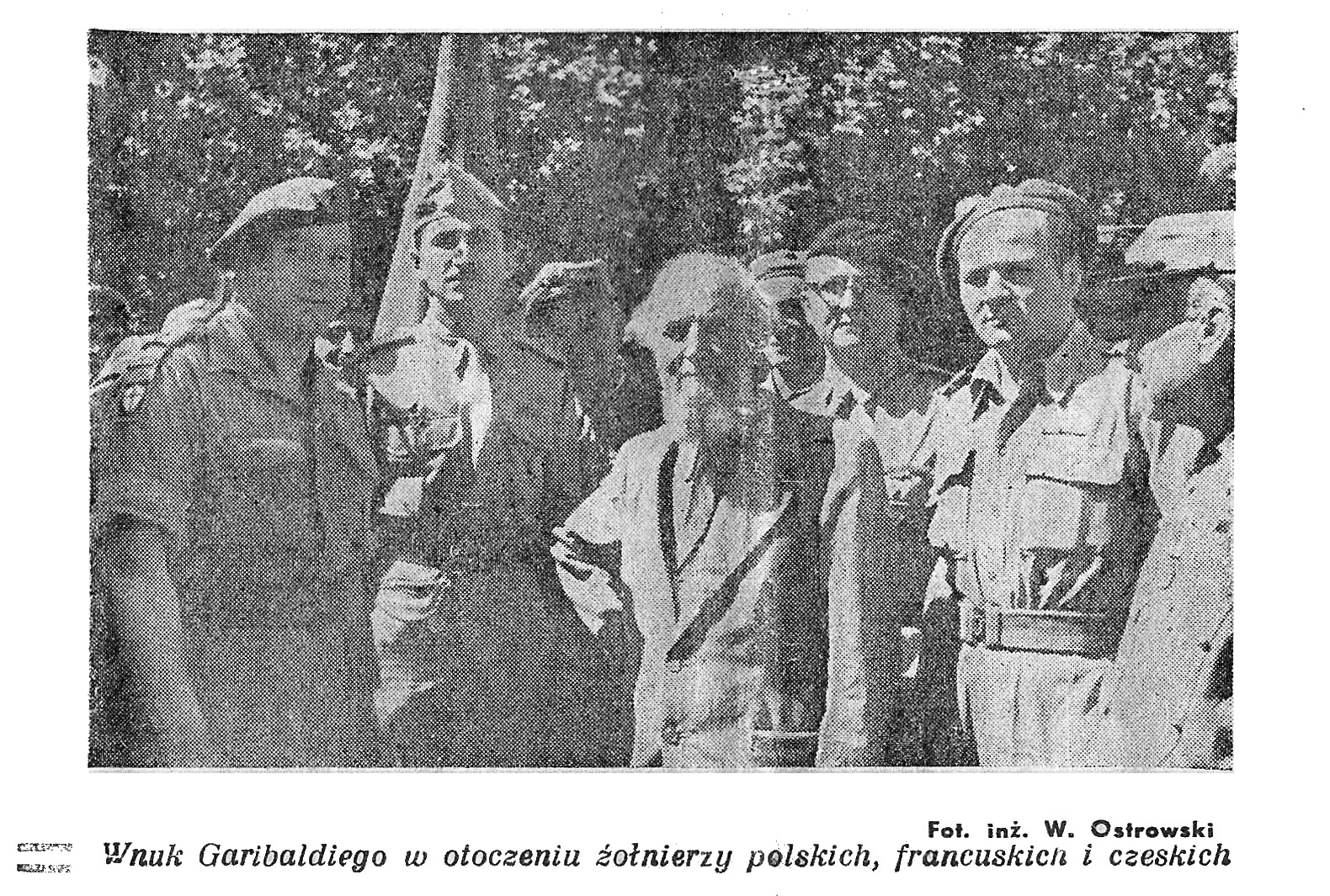
Grodyński (left) representing Polish Armed Forces at commemoration with Garibaldi's grandson

Assigned to Unit II of Army Section Command on 31 December 1942, Grodyński moved from Iraq with 5th Division to Gaza in Palestine. (The dissolution of 6th Infantry Division and merger with 5th Borderland Infantry Division under the sign of the bison, was completed on 11 March 1943.) While there he was visited by his son Marjan, on leave from the famous submarine Sokół, and together they managed to visit Grodyński's wife, Halina, who was working as a Specialist Nurse with the Red Cross in a Polish Hospital near Ismailia in Egypt. The next deployment of the units of 5th Division was in the vicinity of El Qantara. After the Allied Forces began military operations in Italy, with the American Army and British Eighth Army attacking Sicily and the Italian peninsula in September 1943, the Polish Army, commanded by General Władysław Anders, was redeployed to Italy. The 5th Borderland Division, commanded by General Bohusz-Szyszko, was transported by sea from Port Said to Taranto, before 2nd Corps attacked Monte Cassino. During heavy fighting against the German Army, 5th Borderland Infantry Division, commanded by General Nikodem Sulik, were victorious in many battles.

Grodyński's military service in this period exploited his administrative\organizational skills, as well as his intelligence background and multi-lingual skills. On 2 June 1945, he took part in a ceremony in Rome celebrating the anniversary of Garibaldi's death, during which he represented Polish Armed Forces (pl), along with military leaders of French and other national armed forces. The ending of the Second World War was devastating for Grodyński and other serving Poles who fought with the Allied Forces when much of Eastern Europe, including Poland, fell to Russian hegemony, thus robbing many of them of the prospect of returning to their homeland.

Having survived the harsh conditions of Siberia Grodyński joined the Polish Armed Forces and served in the Command of the independent Polish Division of the Eighth Army in North Africa and at Monte Cassino, his key role was acknowledged with his promotion to Captain on 12 June 1946 by Brigadier General Nikodem Sulik.

== Post-War years ==
After he joined the Polish Resettlement Corps, on 28 March 1947, Grodyński left Italy and sailed to Liverpool. His first place of residence was Polish Military Camp in Chiseldon, near Swindon in Wiltshire, where he became Head of a Polish School created for young Polish soldiers, before moving to reside in London.

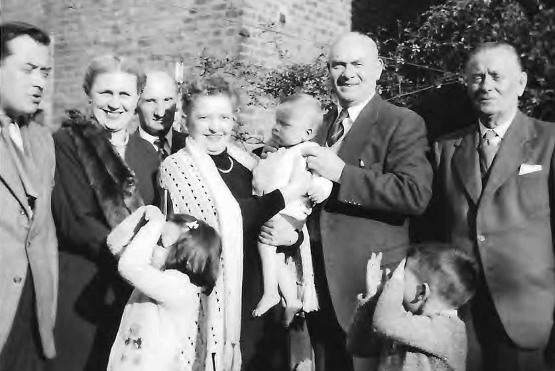
Grodyński and wife holding grandson "Stasiu" with Nika and Major Zenon Offenkowski, son Marjan and his children, plus Colonel Józef Werobej (right)

Grodyński's closest friends in London were Colonel Józef Werobej (pl) and the Lubomirski-Tyszkiewicz, Offenkowski and Banks families. In addition to the various employment roles he undertook he was a member of different Polish organizations, including the London Institute of 5th Borderland Infantry Division at which, in September 1966, he attended the twenty-fifth anniversary of the Division during which General Władysław Sikorski was commemorated by General Władysław Anders. On Sunday 3 January 1971 Grodyński participated in an event presenting New Year's greetings to President August Zaleski in the Polish President's Office in London. Living in Balham, South London, Grodyński was one of the first members of the Polish Catholic Parish and of the White Eagle Club inaugurated in the area.

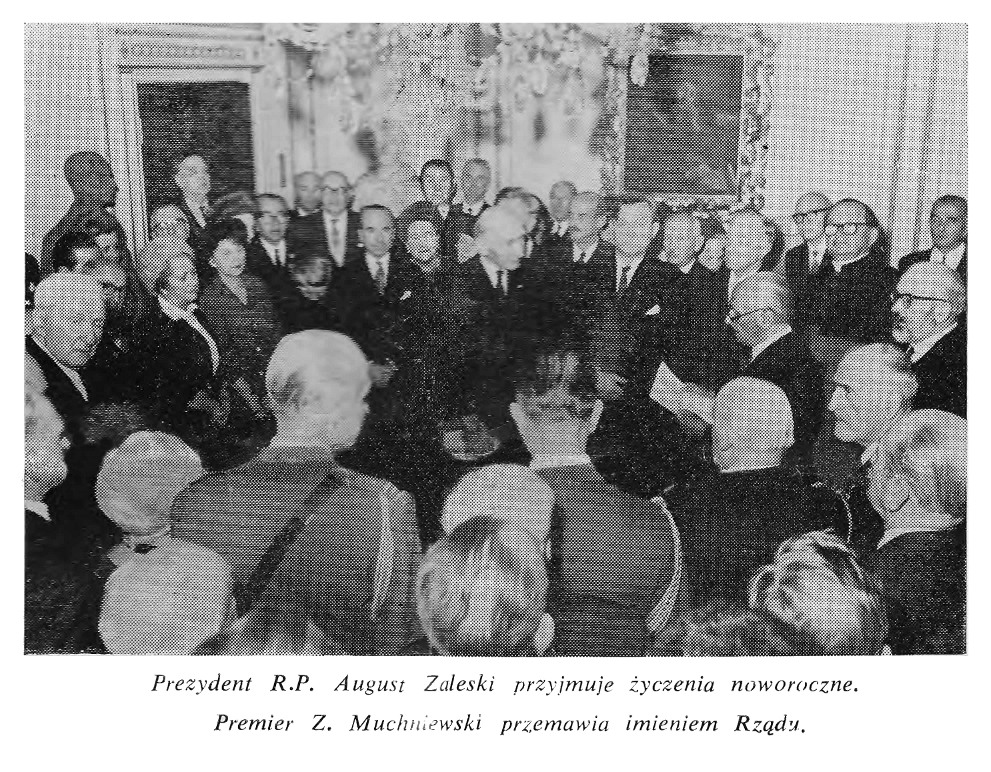
Grodyński (typically in 'background' – third top right) at new year celebration with Polish President and Polish Prime Minister Muchniewski

Throughout the post-war period Grodyński maintained contacts with government, military and business leaders with whom he had worked previously, while endeavouring 'behind the scenes' (given his senior military intelligence background) to assist the Polish Government-in-exile. A back injury sustained in breaking the fall of one of Poland's former Generals with whom he was walking in London, contributed to his death. Following serious deterioration in his physical health, Stanisław SA Grodyński died in St James' Hospital, Balham, in 1971, and was laid to rest at Streatham Cemetery, to be later joined there by his wife, Halina, who died in 1984.

== Awards ==
=== Polish honours ===
- | Gold Cross of Merit {1923} (ZKZ – Złoty Krzyż Zasługi)
- | Commemorative Medal for War of 1918–1921 {1928}
- | Medal of the 10th anniversary of Independence {1928}
- | Silesian Uprising Cross {1946}
- | Medal for Long Service – Bronze 10 Years {1938}
- | Medal for Long Service – Silver 20 Years {1938}

=== British honours ===
- || 1939–1945 Star
- || Defence Medal
- || War Medal 1939–1945
- || Italy Star

== Bibliography ==
- Gwiazdka Cieszyńska ... edition of 13 June 1896 (49#24) recording the marriage of AK and AM in Cieszyn Parish Church
- The beginning of independence (11 November 1918) ... Museum of Józef Piłsudski in Sulejówek, retrieved 19 December 2013 (in Polish)
- Dziennik Śląska Cieszyńskiego ... editions of 26, 30 July 1925 (XXII#161/152-3, 163/159,161) with AG obituary, funeral and tribute details
- Gwiazdka Cieszyńska ... editions of 28, 31 July 1925 (78#58/224, 59/227) noting further AG details and account of funeral procession
- Starosts of Interwar Period 1918–1939 (Słownik biograficzny starostów Drugiej Rzeczypospolitej) ... Janusz Mierzwa, (2018) SG Starost p194/5 ISBN 9788365080769 (in Polish)
- Kalendarz Grudziądzki 2002 ... Stanisław Poręba, SG Starost 1937–1939 p145-6
- Dziennik Bydgoski ... editions of 6 January 1938, SG appointment as Starost, 18 May 1939 (XXIII#114), SG meeting in Grudziądz with Mayor Józef Włodek (pl), Pomeranian Governor Władysław Raczkiewicz, General Michał Karaszewicz-Tokarzewski and Marshal Edward Rydz-Śmigły (before his appointment as Commander-in-Chief of Polish Forces)
- Biuletyn Grudziądz ... edition of 18 March 2020 noting SG as "last Starost of Grudziądz before outbreak of WWII" p4
- Poland's 1939 Defensive War ... Eugeniusz Kozłowski, Wydawnictwo Ministerstwa Obrony Nradowej, Warszawa 1979. ISBN 83-11-06314-1 (in Polish)
- Poland in the Second World War ... Jozef Garlinski, ISBN 0-333-39258-2
- The Pattern of Soviet Domination ... Stanisław Mikolajczyk (Sampson Low, Marston & Co 1948)
- The Fate of Poles in the USSR 1939~1989 Tomasz Piesakowski, ISBN 0-901342-24-6
- Orzeł Biały (White Eagle) ... edition Nr 24 (159) p9 'O Wolność Prawdziwą' (For Real Freedom, June 1945) Stanisław SA Grodyński representing Poland's Armed Forces at allied commemoration in Rome with Garibaldi grandson (full-page article including two photos)
- The Polish Resettlement Corps: Organisation of the Corps and Plans for its Employment ... HM Government 1946
- Rzeczpospolita Polska (Republic of Poland) ... London 31 January 1971 – Rok XV NrI (197), front-page lead article and photograph of new year celebration of 3 January with President August Zaleski and Prime Minister Zygmunt Muchniewski
- Eugeniusz Lubomirski – Kartki z mego życia ... Polska Fundacja Kulturalna, (1998), with numerous references to cousin, mutual friend and Polish Army Command comrade, Stefan Tyszkiewicz (in Polish)
- The Grodyński Brigade (Brygadą Grodyńskawo) ... 1977/2012 book by Andrzej ST Grodyński with biography of Stanisław on pages 47–77
