= August Zaleski =

Polish politician and diplomat

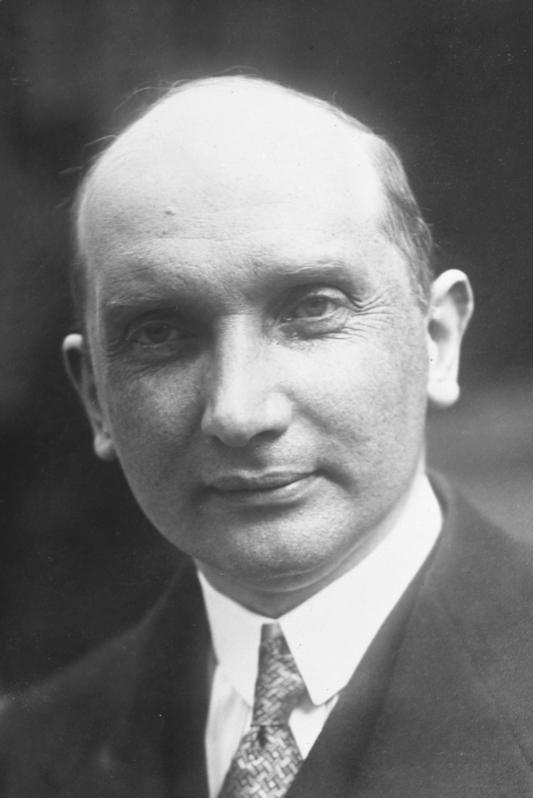
- Zaleski in 1931

President of Poland
- In exile 9 June 1947 – 7 April 1972 Serving with Council of Three (from 9 June 1954)
- Prime Minister: Tomasz Arciszewski; Tadeusz Bór-Komorowski; Tadeusz Tomaszewski; Roman Odzierzyński; Jerzy Hryniewski; Stanisław Cat-Mackiewicz; Hugon Hanke; Antoni Pająk; Aleksander Zawisza; Zygmunt Muchniewski
- Head of State in country: Bolesław Bierut; Aleksander Zawadzki; Edward Ochab; Marian Spychalski; Józef Cyrankiewicz; Henryk Jabłoński
- Preceded by: Władysław Raczkiewicz
- Succeeded by: Stanisław Ostrowski

Personal details
- Born: 13 September 1883 Warsaw, Congress Poland, Russian Empire
- Died: 7 April 1972 (aged 88) London, England, UK
- Party: Independent

August Zaleski (13 September 1883 – 7 April 1972) was a Polish economist, freemason, politician, and diplomat. Twice Minister of Foreign Affairs of the Republic of Poland, he served as President of Poland–in-exile.

== Life and career ==
August Zaleski was born in Warsaw on 13 September 1883. In 1901, he graduated from a gymnasium in Praga and became librarian to the Krasiński family, but later moved to London, where he graduated with a master's degree from the London School of Economics. He was unable to return to Poland during World War I and, in 1917, started giving lectures in Polish in London. Around that time, he also became interested in freemasonry and was one of the collaborators of the Polish National Committee, the institution which was to become the Polish representative to the Triple Entente. As such, he was one of Roman Dmowski's envoys to assure English politicians that Józef Piłsudski's Polish Legions had sided with the Central Powers in order to combat Russia, not the West.

In 1918, when Poland regained its independence, Zaleski proved to be a skilled diplomat and served in various posts in Polish embassies in Switzerland, Greece, Italy and was one of the Polish envoys to the League of Nations. After the May Coup d'État of 1926, he sided with the camp of Marshal Józef Piłsudski and, until 1932, held the post of minister of foreign affairs in two subsequent governments.

In June 1932, Zaleski was attending a session of the League of Nations in Geneva when he found himself thrust in the middle of the crisis in Danzig as he learned that the destroyer ORP Wicher had been sent into the harbour of the Free City of Danzig (modern Gdańsk, Poland) without the permission of the Senate of the Free City. Although Zaleski had not been personally informed that the Wicher was going to Danzig, he put up an able defence of Poland in the League Assembly and Council. In talks with the Secretary-General Sir Eric Drummond, in exchange for an undertaking that Poland would not send the Wicher back to Danzig when the German battleship Schlesien was scheduled to visit, a confrontation that would potentially cause a German-Polish war, Zaleski wanted the League to pressure the Free City to resolve the port d'attache issue governing the right of the Polish Navy to use Danzig harbour and managed to obtain a resolution satisfactory to Poland. Zaleski's offer was taken and Drummond successfully pressured the Free City into settling the port d'attache issue in a manner favourable to Poland.

Between 1928 and 1935, Zaleski was a member of the Polish Senate. At the end of his term, he retired from active politics and became chairman of Bank Handlowy (Commercial Bank), one of the best-known Polish banks of the time. He held that post until the invasion of Poland (1939), when he successfully evacuated his company's assets first to France and then to the United Kingdom.

In exile, August Zaleski again became minister of foreign affairs, this time in the government of General Władysław Sikorski. In June 1947, Zaleski was named president of the Polish government in exile. Initially supported by much of the Polish diaspora (Polonia), he named General Tadeusz Bór-Komorowski as prime minister. However, by the end of his seven-year term, Zaleski was facing opposition and was at odds with much of the political elite. His response was to extend his term and name Stanisław Cat-Mackiewicz as prime minister. Many Poles in exile (Bór-Komorowski and Władysław Anders amongst them) considered this unlawful and created the Council of Three in response. It was a temporary triumvirate which held the role of the president of Poland until Zaleski properly resigned his post. However, in reality, for almost twenty years, the Council and Zaleski both claimed the position simultaneously.

== Death and legacy ==
August Zaleski died in London on 7 April 1972. Among his papers, two conflicting nominations for his successor were found: one naming Stanisław Ostrowski and the other one, perhaps forged, naming Juliusz Nowina-Sokolnicki. The Council of Three accepted the former and disbanded. In November 2022, the remains of Zaleski, Ostrowski, and Władysław Raczkiewicz, and were moved from the cemetery at Newark-on-Trent in England to the mausoleum for emigree presidents at the Temple of Divine Providence in Warsaw.

Zaleski's papers pertaining to his diplomatic work and Polish life during and after World War II are held in the collection of the Hoover Institution.

Political offices
Preceded by Władysław Raczkiewicz	President of the Polish Republic in exile 1947–1972	Succeeded by Stanisław Ostrowski
