= Mackiewicz cabinet =

Cabinet of Stanisław Mackiewicz (Polish: Rząd Stanisława Mackiewicza) was formed by the Polish Government in Exile on 8 June 1954, serving until 21 June 1955.

== Original cabinet ==
- Stanisław Mackiewicz, Prime Minister.
- Kazimierz Okulicz, Minister of Justice.
- Zygmunt Rusinek, Minister of Émigré Affairs.
- Stanisław Sopicki (Labor Party), Minister of the Treasury, Industry and Trade.

== Changes ==
- August 1954:
  - Gen. Michał Karaszewicz-Tokarzewski became Minister of National Defense.
  - Antoni Pająk (ZSP) became Minister of Congressional Works.

== See also ==
- Polish Government in Exile
