= Union of Military Poles in Russia =

Polish organization in Russia (1917–1918)

Polish Military Union in Russia
- Active: 24 March 1917 – 4 February 1918

The Union of Military Poles in Russia (Polish: Związek Wojskowych Polaków w Rosji; Russian: Союза военных поляков; PMU), or Polish Military Union, was a Polish military organization in the Revolutionary Army of Free Russia of 1917. It united as many as 800 legal organizations of Polish officers, non-commissioned officers, privates and military employees.

The union was created on March 24, 1917, following the February Revolution of 1917. It existed until early 1918. The organizations were divided by district. Its management body was the Central Board. The PMU's goal was to gather Poles serving in the Russian army, spread Polish nationalism and education, and take care of the people in the military, as well as the disabled, prisoners of war, and the military personnel's families. The PMU's activities were important in furthering the nationalisation of Russian Army units. The PMU was strongly supported by the Poles in Ukraine, and the II and III Polish Corps were involved in the social conflict in Right-bank Ukraine between Polish landowners and Ukrainian peasants.

== Background ==
Following the outbreak of the February Revolution across the Russian Empire and the announcement by the Russian Provisional Government on March 29, 1917, of its recognition of the Polish people's right to establish an independent Polish state, a spontaneous movement arose among all Polish military personnel, both officers and privates, to separate from the Russian army and form separate Polish units.

By the end of March, the Polish Rifle Division, then being formed in the Kyiv region, already had 18,000 soldiers in its ranks and about 12,000 in its Reserve Regiment in Belgorod. There was no room for the rest of those who volunteered. Frontline military personnel and those garrisoned throughout Russia demanded from the Polish Rifle Division command that the existing Division be expanded and transformed into a Corps, and then a Polish Army be formed. Lacking an outlet for their aspirations, Polish military personnel began to organize themselves into Military Unions.

== Formation ==
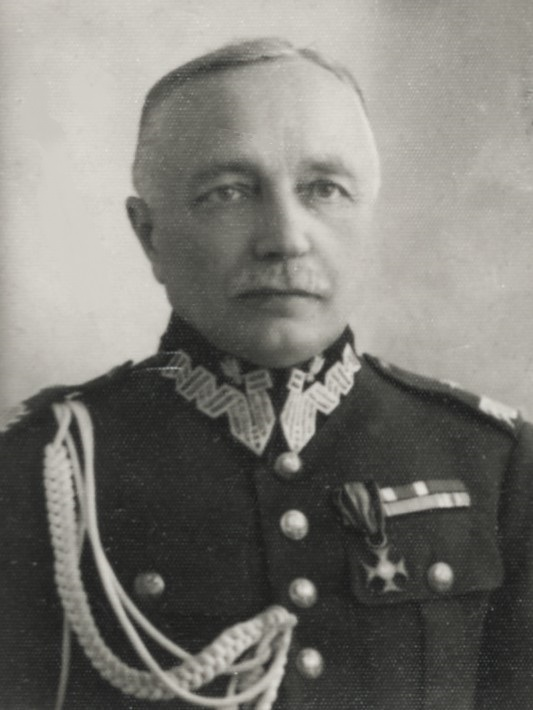
Tadeusz Jastrzębski in the 1930s

The first organization was created by Tadeusz Jastrzębski, a Colonel of Artillery. The organization was established in Tsarskoye Selo on March 24, 1917 as an organization of the Petrograd Military District. Later, branches of the union in were established in the Moscow, Kiev, Western and Northern districts.

Individual activists had different views on the union's tasks related to World War I, February Revolution and the formation of a Polish army in Russia. The left-leaning supporters of Józef Piłsudski wanted to gather Poles in a union in order to survive the war and preserve their strength for a later period. The aim of the Endecja was to form Polish army units to fight the Imperial German Army under general Russian command.

On March 24, 1917, the first "Union of Military Poles" (PMU) was established. Its goal was to establish links between Polish soldiers in the Russian Army on a national basis and to provide mutual assistance to the broadest extent possible to:

1. strive for association;
2. ensure communication between the association's branches before making representations to the Russian authorities and political activists;
3. convene congresses;
4. elect a headquarters.

This initiative to organize was taken up everywhere. PMU began to be established throughout Russia and at the front, organized primarily for cultural, educational, and to encourage nationalism. In early April 1917, PMU began to apply en masse to the command of the Polish Rifle Division in Kyiv for admission to the ranks, both as officers and privates. Since the division's positions were already full, the Polish personnel raised the idea of forming a Polish Army by expanding the existing Polish Rifle Division.

To clarify the matter of forming a Polish Army and the future of the Polish Rifle Division, in the first days of April, General Tadeusz Bylewski sent a delegation to Petrograd, consisting of Colonel Lucjan Żeligowski, Captain Stanisław Wężyk, Lieutenant Ostrowski, Lieutenant Liesl, and Second Lieutenant Zdziechowski.} The delegation arrived in Petrograd on April 3, 1917. This delegation was to establish contact with the political representation of Polish society in Petrograd and, together with this society, to take action aimed at creating a Polish Army.

However, the Polish emigrants were unable to establish a unified representation in Russia. The delegation therefore met with four camps, each based on different principles. The socialist camp firmly opposed the formation of Polish military units. The Democratic Party also declared itself against the formation of a Polish Army in exile, justifying this viewpoint by arguing that such an important decision could not be made unless it had the consent of the country, i.e., the Council of State. The Polish National Committee spoke in favor of the gradual expansion of existing Polish units into the Polish Army. Finally, the Union called the "Polish Military Confederation" immediately and unreservedly supported the immediate creation of a National Army.

After a joint conference with these representatives of various political movements, the delegation decided to establish contact with the National Committee and also concluded that the current situation was not the time to discuss the creation of a large allied army, but rather to limit itself to the immediate and planned formation of Polish corps in the Russian army under a unified Polish supreme command. At the same time, the National Committee, at a plenary session, without the participation of Division representatives, adopted a resolution, which it immediately communicated to the Division delegation. This resolution stated that the National Committee, due to current conditions and noting the spontaneous trend manifesting itself among the Polish military, considers it advisable to seek the Russian authorities' support for the expansion of Polish formations to a strength of 2-3 or more corps, that the personnel of these future formations must be the existing and only Polish Division, and that the Committee is ready to fully support the Division's action in this direction, to whose disposal it submits itself. After joint consultation with representatives of the National Committee, the delegation concluded that it is highly desirable to immediately establish a commission consisting of representatives of the Russian General Staff, representatives of the National Committee, and selected representatives of the Division. This commission would develop a law and a plan for the formation of future Polish corps. Then, a delegation with representatives of the National Committee arranged with the Ministry of War in Petrograd the matter of establishing such a commission as soon as possible.

Simultaneously with the dispatch of the delegation to Petrograd, the commander of the Polish Rifle Division, General Bylewski, convened a Congress of delegates from all units of the Division in Kyiv to discuss the ideological principles for the further development of Polish formations in Russia and to develop regulations based on sound military principles. The Congress lasted from April 14–30, 1917, in Kyiv and primarily developed an ideological declaration, adopted on April 21, with the following content:

1. We strive to achieve the independence of all United Poland.
2. We recognize the right of all nations to independently decide their own fate.
3. The internal structure of the Polish State, the form of government, and the rights of its citizens will be determined by the nation itself in the Sejm Constituting the Polish State, elected on the basis of universal, direct, secret, and equal voting.
4. We deem it right and just that in the future Polish State all citizens, regardless of religion or nationality, should be equal before the law.
5. The recognition by the Anti-German Coalition, which is an association of free peoples fighting for universal freedom, as one of the war goals: the rebuilding of an independent Polish State from all the torn Polish lands, a goal which has not yet been recognized by the Central Powers, which refuse to cede their partitions to Poland, places us in the ranks of the Coalition as allies.
6. To achieve all these aspirations and goals, we deem it necessary to create the Polish Army.
7. We deem it necessary to base the Polish Army on the following principles:
  1. a) As soldiers of a Poland rising towards freedom, we fight and will fight for its complete and total liberation.
  2. b) All soldiers and officers of the Polish Army enjoy all civil rights.
  3. c) We consider the strictest fulfillment of military duties to be a requirement of Polish military honor.
8. The Polish Army should stand at the highest level of perfection. Seeing the Polish Rifle Division as the cadre of the future Polish Army, we will work constantly to improve its moral and professional skills.
9. Considering that society without the army and an army without society cannot exist normally, we appeal to the entire Polish community for cooperation in fulfilling our national tasks.

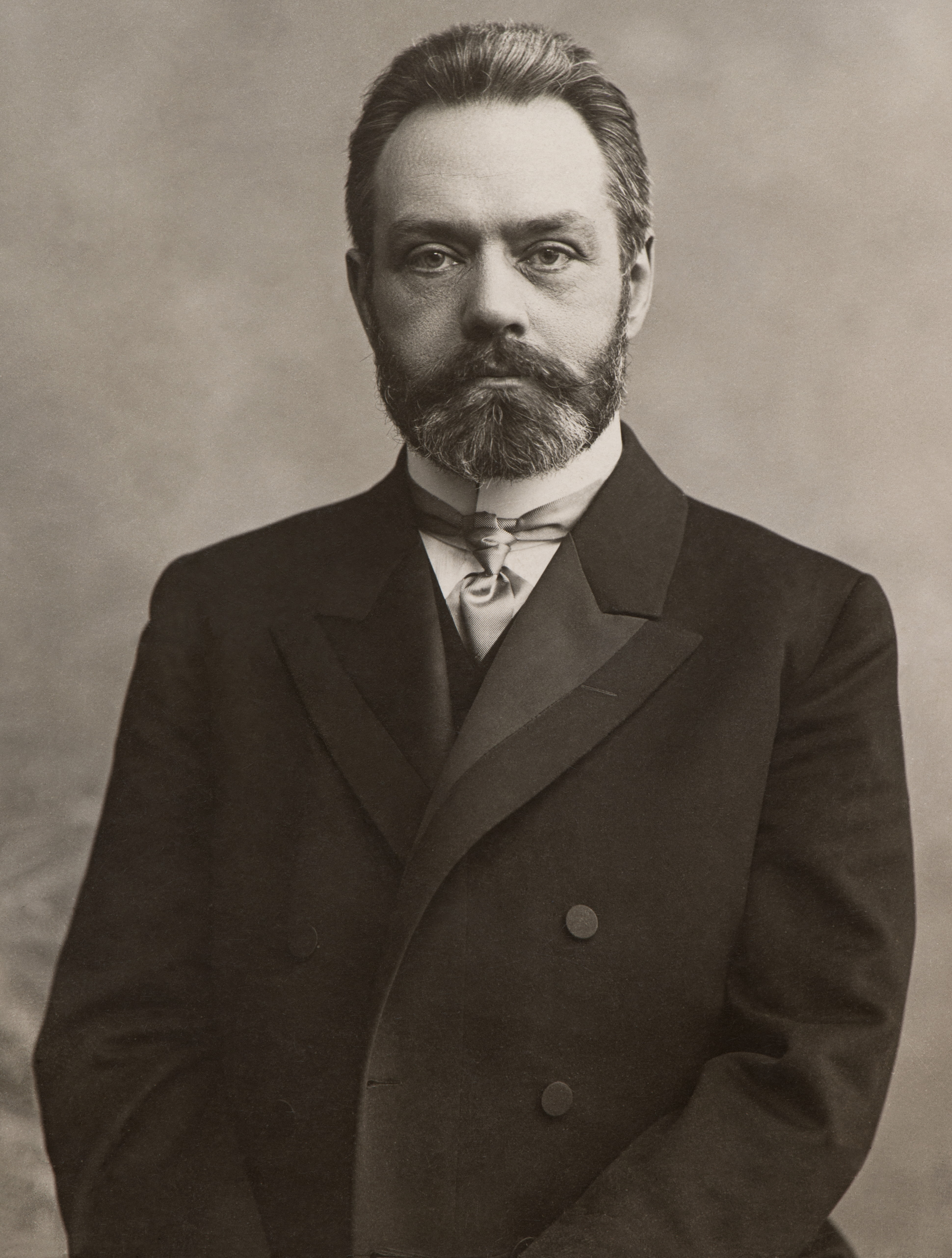
Russian Minister of War Alexander Guchkov in 1917

The congress then developed a series of regulations, later approved by General Bylewski, regulating internal affairs in the Polish Rifle Division. These concerned the mutual relations between officers and privates, new uniforms and insignia, and, above all, the attitude of Polish soldiers towards a number of contemporary orders issued by the Russian military authorities, contrary to the principles of military discipline. On April 30, the congress selected a delegation, which, together with General Bylewski, traveled to Petrograd to expedite the formation of the Corps. At the same time, General Bylewski was appointed head of the "Military Commission for the Formation of Polish Units" at the Russian General Staff. This commission was to be the nucleus of the Polish General Staff. Minister of War Alexander Guchkov agreed to expand the existing Polish Rifle Division into a Corps consisting of two infantry divisions, a light artillery brigade, a howitzer battery, and an uhlan regiment, and signed a relevant order of the Russian General Staff.

This was a half-hearted solution, but if implemented immediately, it would have saved Polish soldiers from becoming Bolsheviks in the ranks of the Russian army by immediately establishing a larger Polish military unit. It was understood that once one Corps had been formed, more would follow, and ultimately, the formation of three or four Corps, as a completely separate unit of the Polish Army, could be achieved. Indeed, the number of Poles in the Russian army as of April 1, 1917, was approximately 500,000, and according to the Russian General Staff, while "Catholics" (a term frequently used by Russians as synonym for Poles, despite also including Lithuanians) in the Russian army included 119 generals, approximately 20,000 officers, and 700,000 privates.

Already then, candidates were being put forward for commanders of a Polish corps: General Eugeniusz de Henning-Michaelis and General Józef Dowbor-Muśnicki; General Antoni Symon took command of the Polish Rifle Division after General Bylewski; other generals, apart from Generals Józef Latour, Jan Jacyna, Józef Leśniewski, Kajetan Olszewski, and Aleksander Osiński, were unknown to Polish society. There were more than enough Polish officers and officials of higher ranks, who held many leading positions in the Russian army, for Polish formations. There would have been even more officers for all branches of arms, as many of the Polish intelligentsia served in the Russian army, where they generally enjoyed a good reputation as combat officers. In general, Polish soldiers would rather serve together with other Poles, instead of with Russians, that were a nation with a different religion and differing customs. It should also not be overlooked that Polish prisoners of war from the Austro-Hungarian and Imperial German armies, approximately 100,000 of whom were held in POW camps in Russia, also tended to want to join the Polish Rifle Division.

However, this unique opportunity to create a large military unit was lost, and the blame for this lies almost entirely with the Polish community in exile. A split developed within it. One camp consisted of supporters of forming Polish units, led by the Endecja, while the other, the so-called Democratic Party, led by Aleksander Lednicki, consisted of opponents of this formation, viewing the existing Polish military formation with clear dislike. The Russian authorities immediately exploited the discord between the political parties in exile, and the general staff delayed carrying out the order to form the corps, thus causing the Polish Rifle Division from Khmelnytskyi to be sent to the front in Eastern Galicia. It seemed that the matter of further formation of Polish units in Russia had been buried, especially since the new Minister of War, Alexander Kerensky, who had been wrongly informed by Alexander Lednicki that Poland did not wish to form a Polish Army in Russia, was a staunch opponent of separating Poles from the Russian army, also taking into account the possible reduction of its ranks.

On the initiative of the PMU, gatherings of soldiers were held at:

Unit	Location
Polish Rifle Division	Kyiv
Romanian Front	Chișinău
South-Western Front	Rechytsa
Western Front	Minsk
Moscow Military District	Moscow

== First General Congress ==
Since the opinions of the Unions were inconsistent, on the initiative of the Unions of the Western Front, Moscow District, and Petrograd District, a general Congress of Polish Military Unions was convened in Petrograd to discuss the formation of the Polish Army.

On June 7-22, 1917, the First General Congress of the Union was held in Petrograd, during which there was a split regarding whether a Polish army should be created in Russia. The left wing left the Union, the remaining members of the congress decided to organize Polish military formations in Russia. This task was entrusted to the Supreme Polish Military Committee (Naczpol). Leading activists of the Union were Władysław Raczkiewicz and W. Szczęsny.

The Left established the Main Committee of the Union of Military Poles (Left) in Russia. It was opposed to the formation of Polish troops in Russia and supported communism. A. Żaboklicki was its president, although it was actually led by R. Łęgawa.

According to Encyklopedia PWN, this split in the PMU squandered the chance to create a large and autonomous Polish army.

== Abandonment in 1918 ==
On February 4, 1918, the Naczpol ceased its activities after the Bolsheviks arrested some of its members, and as a result of the Russian army's demobilization and the creation of the Red Army in early 1918, the PMU ceased to exist.

== See also ==
- Polish I Corps in Russia
- Polish II Corps in Russia
- Puławy Legion, Polish military unit of the Imperial Russian Army
