= Jerzy Hryniewski =

Polish politician

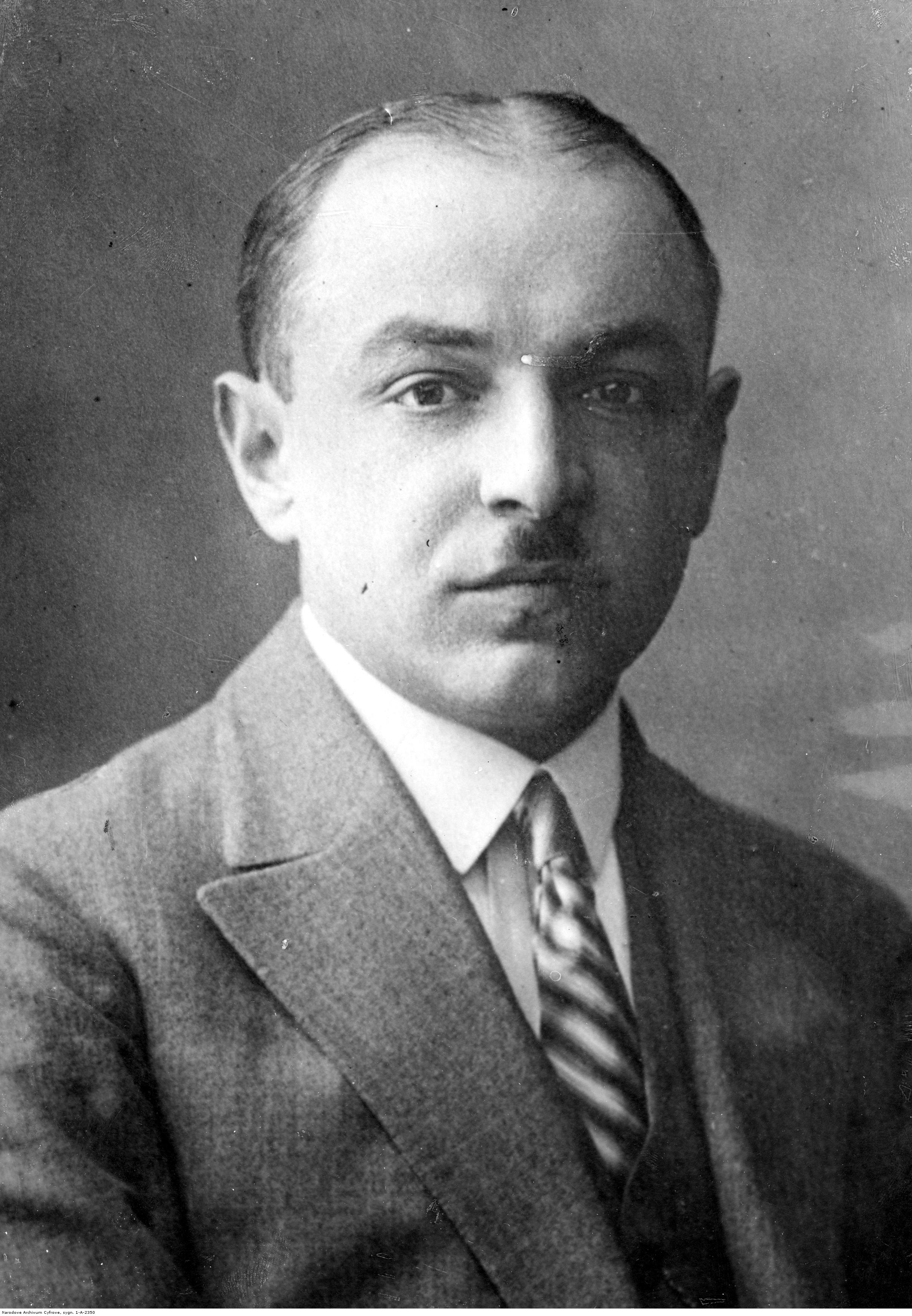
Mikołaj Dolanowski

Jerzy Hryniewski [ˈjɛʐɨ xrɨˈɲɛfski] (29 December 1895 – 15 March 1978) was a Polish politician, who is best known for serving as 36th Prime Minister of Poland and 6th Prime Minister of the Polish government-in-exile from 18 January to 13 May 1954. He was also active in Polish politics during Second Republic.

His real name was Mikołaj Dolanowski, but he used pseudonym Jerzy Hryniewski as member of the secret Polska Organizacja Wojskowa before reinstating of Independence. Later it became his legal name.

From 1928 to 1932 he was a secretary of ruling party during Sanacja period – BBWR. He also served as Member of Sejm (1930–1935) and deputy Minister of Interior (1932–1934).

After World War II he became an active politician in exile. Finally he was a Prime Minister in Exile under President August Zaleski.

Preceded by Roman Odzierzyński	Prime Minister of the Republic of Poland in Exile; 1954	Succeeded by Stanisław Mackiewicz
