= Komorowski cabinet =

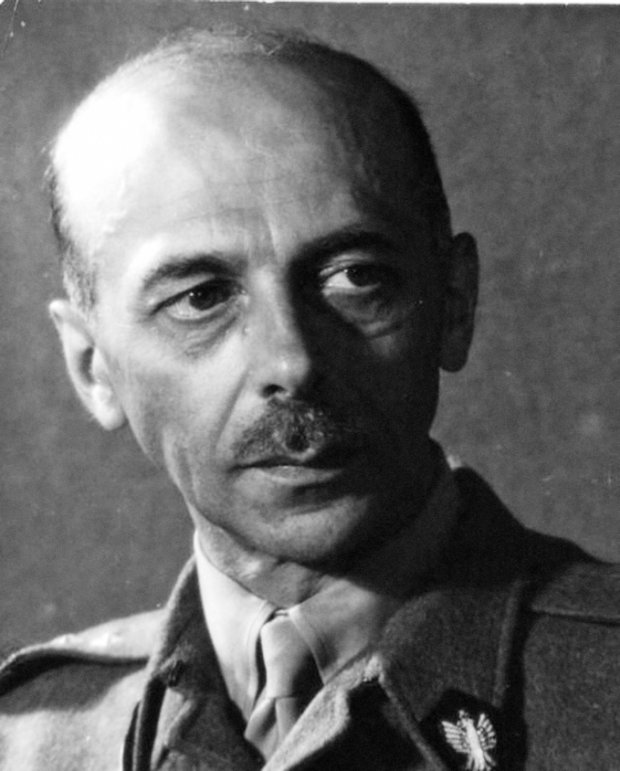
Tadeusz Bór-Komorowski.

Cabinet of Tadeusz Komorowski (Polish: Rząd Tadeusza Komorowskiego) was a Polish cabinet in exile headed by Generał Tadeusz Bór-Komorowski.

The cabinet was formed on 2 July 1947 and resigned on 10 February 1949

- Tadeusz Bór-Komorowski, Prime Minister.
- Zygmunt Berezowski (SN), Minister of Internal Affairs.
- Adam Pragier (ZPS), Minister of Information.
- Bronisław Kuśnierz (SP), Minister of Justice.
- Władysław Folkierski (SN), Minister of Religion and Public Enlightenment.
- Adam Tarnowski, Minister of Foreign Affairs.
- Gen. Marian Kukiel, Minister of National Defense.
- Stanisław Sopicki (SP), Minister of the Public Administration Reconstruction.

== See also ==
- Polish Government in Exile
