= Polish government-in-exile =

1939–1990 government-in-exile

Government of the Republic of Poland in exile Rząd Rzeczypospolitej Polskiej na uchodźstwie
- 1939–1990
- Flag Coat of arms (1956–1990)
- Anthem: Poland Is Not Yet Lost
- Status: Government in exile
- Capital: Warsaw
- Capital-in-exile: Paris (1939–1940); Angers (1940); London (1940–1990)
- Common languages: Polish
- President
  - 1939–1947 (first): Władysław Raczkiewicz
  - 1989–1990 (last): Ryszard Kaczorowski
- Prime Minister
  - 1939–1943 (first): Władysław Sikorski
  - 1986–1990 (last): Edward Szczepanik
- Historical era: World War II and Cold War
  - Government evacuated from Poland and interred in Romania: 17 September 1939
  - Presidency ceded by Ignacy Mościcki to Władysław Raczkiewicz: 30 September 1939
  - Sikorski–Mayski agreement: 30 July 1941
  - Loss of wide diplomatic recognition: 5 July 1945
  - Diplomatic recognition withdrawn by last country: 19 October 1972
  - Handover of national insignia to Warsaw government: 22 December 1990
  - Liquidation of apparatus accomplished: 31 December 1991
Preceded by	Succeeded by
Second Polish Republic	Provisional Government of National Unity; Third Polish Republic

The government of the Republic of Poland in exile was formed in the aftermath of the September 1939 invasion and subsequent occupation of Poland by Nazi Germany, the Soviet Union, and the Slovak Republic, which brought to an end the Second Polish Republic.

Despite the occupation of Poland by hostile powers, the government-in-exile exerted considerable influence in Poland during World War II through the structures of the Polish Underground State and its military arm, the Armia Krajowa (Home Army) resistance. Abroad, under the authority of the government-in-exile, Polish military units that had escaped the occupation fought under their own commanders as part of Allied forces in Europe, Africa, and the Middle East.

After the war, as the Polish territory came under the control of the communist Polish People's Republic, the government-in-exile remained in existence, albeit without effective power. It lost recognition of the majority of states upon formation of the Provisional Government of National Unity on 5 July 1945, although it continued to be hosted and informally supported by the United Kingdom. The last country to withdraw its diplomatic recognition was the Holy See (Vatican City) on 19 October 1972. However, only after the end of communist rule in Poland did the government-in-exile formally pass its responsibilities and insignia onto the government of the Third Polish Republic at a special ceremony held on 22 December 1990 at the Royal Castle in Warsaw, while the liquidation of its apparatus was declared accomplished on 31 December 1991.

The government-in-exile was based in France during 1939 and 1940, first in Paris and then in Angers. From 1940, following the Fall of France, the government moved to London, and remained in the United Kingdom until its dissolution in 1990.

== History ==
=== Establishment ===
On 17 September 1939, the President of the Polish Republic, Ignacy Mościcki, who was then in the small town of Kuty (now Ukraine) near the southern Polish border, issued a proclamation about his plan to transfer power and appointing Władysław Raczkiewicz, the Marshal of the Senate, as his successor. This was done in accordance with Article 24 of the Constitution of the Republic of Poland, adopted in April 1935. Article 24 provided as follows:

In event of war, the term of the President's office shall be prolonged until three months after the conclusion of peace; the President of the Republic shall then, by a special act promulgated in the Official Gazette, appoint his successor, in case the office falls vacant before the conclusion of peace. Should the President's successor assume office, the term of his office shall expire at the end of three months after the conclusion of peace.

It was not until 29 or 30 September 1939 that Mościcki resigned. Raczkiewicz, who was already in Paris, immediately took his constitutional oath at the Polish Embassy and became President of the Republic of Poland. Raczkiewicz then appointed General Władysław Sikorski to be prime minister. After Edward Rydz-Śmigły stepped down, Raczkiewicz also made Sikorski Commander-in-Chief of the Polish Armed Forces.

Most of the Polish Navy escaped to Britain, and tens of thousands of Polish soldiers and airmen escaped through Hungary and Romania or across the Baltic Sea to continue the fight in France. Many Poles subsequently took part in Allied operations: in Norway (Narvik), in France in 1940 and in 1944, in the Battle of Britain, in the Battle of the Atlantic, in North Africa (notably Tobruk), Italy (notably at Monte Cassino and Ancona), at Arnhem, Wilhelmshaven, and elsewhere.

Under the Sikorski–Mayski agreement of July 1941 Polish soldiers taken prisoner by the Soviet Union in 1939, were released to form Anders' Army, intended to fight Nazi Germany in the USSR, but instead transferred via Iran to fight with US and British forces. Berling's Army, formed in the USSR in 1944, remained there and fought under Soviet command.

=== Wartime history ===
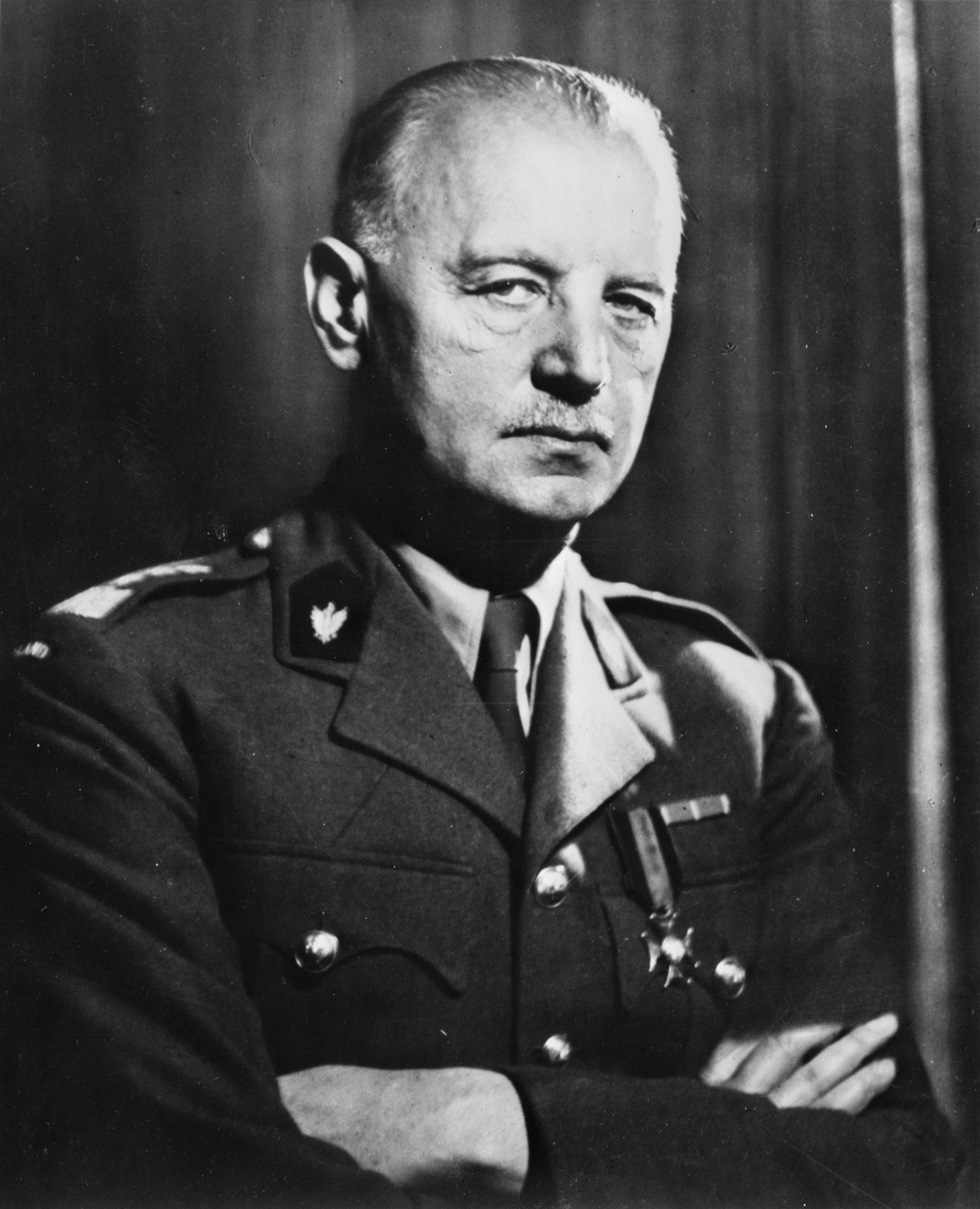
Władysław Sikorski, first Prime Minister of the Polish government in exile.

The Polish government in exile, based first in Paris, then in Angers, France, where Władysław Raczkiewicz lived at the Château de Pignerolle near Angers from 2 December 1939 until June 1940. Escaping from France, the government relocated to London, where it was recognized by all the Allied governments. Politically, it was a coalition of the Polish Peasant Party, the Polish Socialist Party, the Labour Party and the National Party, although these parties maintained only a vestigial existence in the circumstances of war.

"The Mass Extermination of Jews in German Occupied Poland", by the Polish government-in-exile addressed to the wartime allies of the then-United Nations, 1942

When Germany launched a war against the Soviets in 1941, the Polish government in exile established diplomatic relations with the Soviet Union against Hitlerism, but also in order to help Poles persecuted by the NKVD. On 12 August 1941 the Kremlin signed a one-time amnesty, extending to thousands of Polish soldiers who had been taken prisoner in 1939 by the Red Army in eastern Poland, including many Polish civilian prisoners and deportees entrapped in Siberia. The amnesty allowed the Poles to create eight military divisions known as the Anders Army. They were evacuated to Iran and the Middle East, where they were desperately needed by the British, hard pressed by Rommel's Afrika Korps. These Polish units formed the basis for the Polish II Corps, led by General Władysław Anders, which together with other, earlier-created Polish units fought alongside the Allies.

During the war, especially from 1942 on, the Polish government in exile provided the Allies with some of the earliest and most accurate accounts of the ongoing Holocaust of European Jews and, through its representatives, like the Foreign Minister Count Edward Raczyński and the courier of the Polish Underground movement, Jan Karski, called for action, without success, to stop it. The note the Foreign Minister, Count Edward Raczynski, sent on 10 December 1942 to the Governments of the United Nations was the first official denunciation by any Government of the mass extermination and of the Nazi aim of total extermination of the Jewish population. It was also the first official document singling out the sufferings of European Jews as Jews and not only as citizens of their respective countries of origin. The note of 10 December 1942 and the Polish Government efforts triggered the Declaration of the Allied Nations of 17 December 1942.

In April 1943, the Germans announced that they had discovered at Katyn Wood, near Smolensk, Russia, mass graves of 10,000 Polish officers (the German investigation later found 4,443 bodies) who had been taken prisoner in 1939 and murdered by the Soviets. The Soviet government said that the Germans had fabricated the discovery. The other Allied governments, for diplomatic reasons, formally accepted this; the Polish government in exile refused to do so.

Stalin then severed relations with the Polish government in exile. Since it was clear that it would be the Soviet Union, not the western Allies, who would liberate Poland from the Germans, this breach had fateful consequences for Poland. In an unfortunate coincidence, Sikorski, widely regarded as the most capable of the Polish exile leaders, was killed in an air crash at Gibraltar in July 1943. He was succeeded as head of the Polish government in exile by Stanisław Mikołajczyk.

During 1943 and 1944, the Allied leaders, particularly Winston Churchill, tried to bring about a resumption of talks between Stalin and the Polish government in exile. But these efforts broke down over several matters. One was the Katyń massacre (and others at Kalinin and Kharkiv). Another was Poland's postwar borders. Stalin insisted that the territories annexed by the Soviets in 1939, which had millions of Poles in addition to mostly Ukrainian and Belarusian populations, should remain in Soviet hands, and that Poland should be compensated with lands to be annexed from Germany. Mikołajczyk, however, refused to compromise on the question of Poland's sovereignty over her prewar eastern territories. A third matter was Mikołajczyk's insistence that Stalin would not set up a Communist government in postwar Poland. Mikołajczyk and his colleagues in the Polish government-in-exile insisted on making a stand in the defense of Poland's pre-1939 eastern border (retaining its Kresy region) as a basis for the future Polish-Soviet border. However, this was a position that could not be defended in practice – Stalin was in occupation of the territory in question. The government-in-exile's refusal to accept the proposed new Polish borders infuriated the Allies, particularly Churchill, making them less inclined to oppose Stalin on issues of how Poland's postwar government would be structured. In the end, the exiles lost on both issues: Stalin re-annexed the eastern territories, as well as proceeded to impose the communist Polish Committee of National Liberation established on 22 July 1944 by renaming it into the Provisional Government of the Republic of Poland on 31 December 1944. However, Poland preserved its status as an independent state, despite the arguments of some influential Communists, such as Wanda Wasilewska, in favor of Poland becoming a republic of the Soviet Union. In November 1944, despite his mistrust of the Soviets, Mikołajczyk resigned to return to Poland.

=== Provisional Government of National Unity ===
Standard of the President in exile.

On 28 June 1945, Mikołajczyk took office in the Provisional Government of National Unity, a new government established as a result of reshuffling the existing Provisional Government, established under the auspices of the Soviet occupation authorities, through inclusion of his fraction. This provided an excuse for the Western allies to approve tacitly the fait accompli of Poland becoming part of the Soviet sphere of influence, and to legitimise the Warsaw government while withdrawing their recognition of the government-in-exile; France did so on 29 June 1945, followed by the United States and United Kingdom on 5 July 1945. The Polish Armed Forces in exile were disbanded in 1945, and most of their members, unable to safely return to Communist Poland, settled in other countries.

Many Polish exiles opposed this action, believing that this government was a façade for the establishment of Communist rule in Poland. This view was later proven correct in 1947 when the Communist-dominated Democratic Bloc won a rigged election. The Communist-dominated bloc was credited with over 80 percent of the vote, a result that was only obtained through large-scale fraud. The opposition claimed it would have won in a landslide (as much as 80 percent, by some estimates) had the election been genuine and Mikołajczyk would have likely become prime minister. In November, at a meeting with the Silesian society, Mikołajczyk was informed that he was to be arrested along with his advisor Paweł Zaleski. The arrest order was already signed. They immediately took the effort to escape. Mikołajczyk headed north, while Zaleski escaped through the southern channel. From the danger zone, Zaleski was taken away in a straw cart. His brother Jan Zaleski from Boyko helped in the escape. Paweł waited a few days with Mikołaj and his father-in-law, Aries of Kamionka in Korfantów near Głuchołazy, before a transfer was arranged. Then through the Czech Republic, Zaleski got to the west, and Mikołajczyk was taken by ship from Szczecin. This was their last stay in Poland.

=== Later postwar history ===
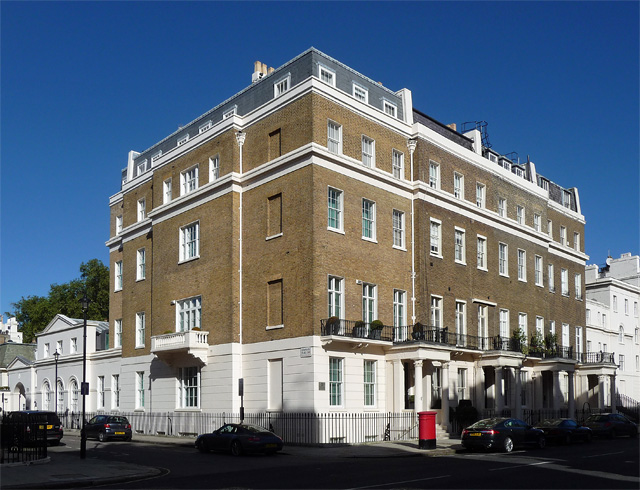
Seat of the Presidents of Poland-in-exile in London

Meanwhile, the Polish government in exile had maintained its existence. The London Poles had to vacate the Polish embassy on Portland Place and were left only with the president's private residence at 43 Eaton Place. The government in exile became largely symbolic of continued resistance to foreign occupation of Poland while retaining some important archives from prewar Poland.

In 1954, political differences led to a split in the ranks of the government in exile. One group, claiming to represent 80% of 500,000 anti-Communist Poles exiled since the war, was opposed to President August Zaleski's continuation in office when his seven-year term expired. It formed a Council of National Unity in July 1954, and set up a Council of Three to exercise the functions of head of state, comprising Tomasz Arciszewski, General Władysław Anders, and Edward Raczyński. Only after Zaleski's death in 1972 did the two factions reunite. Some supporters of the government in exile eventually returned to Poland, such as Prime Minister Hugon Hanke in 1955 and his predecessor Stanisław Mackiewicz in 1956. The Soviet-installed government in Warsaw campaigned for the return of the exiles, promising decent and dignified employment in communist Polish administration and forgiveness of past transgressions. The Republic of Ireland, Francoist Spain and finally (on 19 October 1972) the Holy See (Vatican City) were the last countries to withdraw recognition of the government-in-exile, though diplomatic privileges had already been withdrawn by Vatican Secretary of State Domenico Tardini in 1959.

Despite these setbacks, the government in exile continued in existence. When Soviet influence over Poland came to an end in 1989, there was still a president and a cabinet of eight, meeting every two weeks in London, commanding the loyalty of about 150,000 Polish veterans and their descendants living in Britain, including 35,000 in London alone.

=== Dissolution and recognition in the Third Polish Republic ===
Only after the end of communist rule in Poland did the government-in-exile formally pass its responsibilities and insignia onto the government of the Third Polish Republic at a special ceremony held on 22 December 1990 at the Royal Castle in Warsaw where Lech Wałęsa, the first non-Communist president of Poland since the war, received the symbols of the Polish Republic (the presidential banner, the presidential and state seals, the presidential sashes, and the original text of the 1935 Constitution) from the last president of the government in exile, Ryszard Kaczorowski. The liquidation of the London-based government apparatus was declared accomplished on 31 December 1991. In 1992, military medals and other decorations awarded by the government in exile were officially recognized in Poland. The Act on Emoluments of a Former President of the Republic of Poland adopted in 1996 which establishes the rights, privileges, remuneration and other benefits of a former president, awarded them explicitly also to the last President-in-exile. This clause was exhausted upon the death of Kaczorowski in the 2010 Smolensk plane crash near Smolensk.

== Government and politics ==
Towards the end of the Occupation of Poland, on 26 July 1944, the top Cabinet (Executive) of the Polish Underground State was the Home Council of Ministers (Polish: Krajowa Rada Ministrów), from the Government Delegation for Poland.

=== Presidents ===
No.	Portrait	President	Took office	Left office	Time in office	Party
1	Władysław Raczkiewicz	Władysław Raczkiewicz (1885–1947)	30 September 1939	6 June 1947 †	7 years, 249 days	Independent
2	August Zaleski	August Zaleski (1883–1972)	9 June 1947	8 April 1972 †	24 years, 304 days	Independent
3	Stanisław Ostrowski	Stanisław Ostrowski (1892–1982)	9 April 1972	24 March 1979	6 years, 349 days	PPS
4	Edward Bernard Raczyński	Edward Bernard Raczyński (1891–1993)	8 April 1979	8 April 1986	7 years, 0 days	Independent
5	Kazimierz Sabbat	Kazimierz Sabbat (1913–1989)	8 April 1986	19 July 1989 †	3 years, 102 days	Independent
6	Ryszard Kaczorowski	Ryszard Kaczorowski (1919–2010) (Note: Transferred authority to Lech Wałęsa on his inauguration. Died on 10 April 2010 in 2010 Polish Air Force Tu-154 crash in Smolensk.)	19 July 1989	22 December 1990	1 year, 156 days	Independent

=== Prime ministers ===
No.	Portrait	Name (born–died)	Term of office			Political party	Ref.
No.	Portrait	Name (born–died)	Took office	Left office	Time in office	Political party	Ref.
1		Władysław Sikorski (1881–1943)	30 September 1939	19 July 1940	293 days	Independent	
2		August Zaleski (1883–1972)	19 July 1940	25 July 1940	6 days	Independent	
1		Władysław Sikorski (1881–1943)	25 July 1940	4 July 1943 †	2 years, 344 days	Independent	
3		Stanisław Mikołajczyk (1901–1966)	14 July 1943	24 November 1944	1 year, 133 days	Polish People's Party	
4		Tomasz Arciszewski (1877–1955)	29 November 1944	2 July 1947	2 years, 215 days	Polish Socialist Party	
5		Tadeusz Bór-Komorowski (1895–1966)	2 July 1947	10 February 1949	1 year, 223 days	Independent	
6		Tadeusz Tomaszewski (1881–1950)	7 April 1949	25 September 1950	1 year, 171 days	Independent	
7		Roman Odzierzyński (1892–1975)	25 December 1950	8 December 1953	3 years, 74 days	Independent	
8		Jerzy Hryniewski (1895–1978)	18 January 1954	13 May 1954	115 days	Polish Independence League	
9		Stanisław Mackiewicz (1896–1966)	8 June 1954	21 June 1955	1 year, 13 days	Independent	
10		Hugon Hanke (1904–1964)	8 August 1955	10 September 1955	33 days	Labour Faction	
11		Antoni Pająk (1893–1965)	10 September 1955	14 June 1965	9 years, 277 days	Polish Socialist Party	
12		Aleksander Zawisza (1896–1977)	25 June 1965	9 June 1970	4 years, 349 days	Independent	
13		Zygmunt Muchniewski (1896–1979)	20 July 1970	13 July 1972	1 year, 359 days	Labour Faction	
14		Alfred Urbański (1899–1983)	18 July 1972	15 July 1976	3 years, 363 days	Polish Socialist Party	
15		Kazimierz Sabbat (1913–1989)	5 August 1976	8 April 1986	9 years, 246 days	Independent	
16		Edward Szczepanik (1915–2005)	8 April 1986	22 December 1990	4 years, 258 days	Independent	

== Armed forces ==
- Association of Armed Struggle (Związek Walki Zbrojnej, ZWZ)
- Grey Ranks (Szare Szeregi)
- Home Army (Armia Krajowa)
- Polish resistance movement in World War II
- Polish Armed Forces in the West
- Polish Armed Forces in the East

== See also ==
- Tadeusz Chciuk-Celt, special envoy of the government
- Juliusz Nowina-Sokolnicki, alternative President of the Republic of Poland (1972–1990)
- Polish Committee of National Liberation (Polish: Polski Komitet Wyzwolenia Narodowego; PKWN), 1944–1945
- Ignacy Schwarzbart
- Henryk Leon Strasburger, Finance Minister and Minister in the Middle East for the Sikorski government; Ambassador to London for Mikolajczyk
- Western betrayal
- Szmul Zygielbojm

== Bibliography ==
- Cienciala, Anna M. (2005). "The Foreign Policy of the Polish Government-in-Exile, 1939–1945: Political and Military Realities versus Polish Psychological Reality" in: John S. Micgiel and Piotr S. Wandycz eds., Reflections on Polish Foreign Policy. New York.
- Davies, Norman (2005). God's Playground: A History of Poland, Vol. 2: 1795 to the Present
- Engel, David (2014). In the Shadow of Auschwitz: The Polish Government-in-exile and the Jews, 1939–1942. UNC Press Books. ISBN 9781469619576.
- Kochanski, Halik (2012). The Eagle Unbowed: Poland and the Poles in the Second World War
