= Khorobriv, Ternopil Oblast =

Rural locality in Ternopil Oblast, Ukraine

Khorobriv Хоробрів
- Location in Ternopil Oblast
- Coordinates: 49°35′55″N 25°7′16″E
- Country: Ukraine
- Oblast: Ternopil Oblast
- Raion: Ternopil Raion
- Hromada: Zboriv urban hromada
- Time zone: UTC+2 (EET)
  - Summer (DST): UTC+3 (EEST)
- Postal code: 47644

Khorobriv (Ukrainian: Хоробрів) is a village in the Zboriv urban hromada of the Ternopil Raion of Ternopil Oblast in Ukraine.

== History ==
The first written mention of the village was in 1503.

After the liquidation of the Kozova Raion on 19 July 2020, the village became part of the Ternopil Raion.

== Religion ==
- Saint Basil the Great church (1992, brick).

== Notable residents ==
- Tadeusz Bór-Komorowski (1895–1966), Polish military leader

== Sources ==
- (in Ukrainian) Уніят В., Хоробрів // Ternopil Encyclopedic Dictionary: in 4 v. / editorial board: H. Yavorskyi and other, Ternopil: "Zbruch", 2008, V. 3: П—Я, S. 558. — ISBN 978-966-528-279-2.
- "Chorobrów (1)". Geographical Dictionary of the Kingdom of Poland (in Polish). 1. Warszawa: Kasa im. Józefa Mianowskiego. 1880. p. 630.
