= Władysław Raczkiewicz =

President of Poland from 1939 to 1947

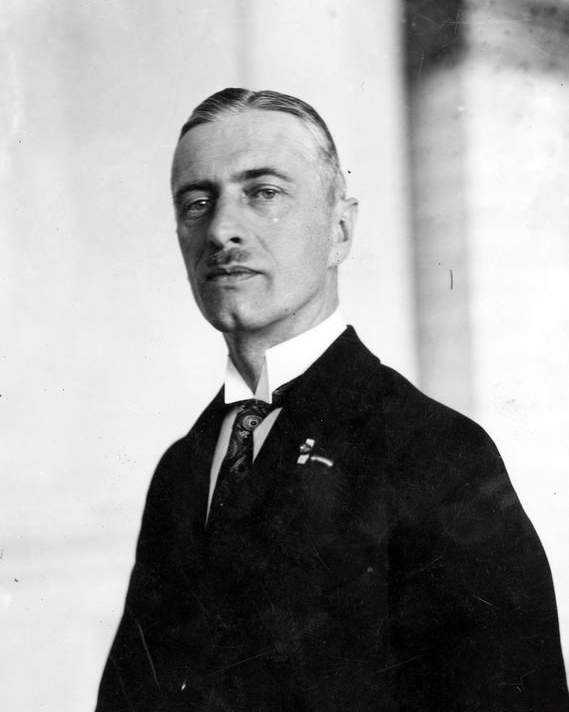
- Raczkiewicz in 1930

President of Poland
- In exile 30 September 1939 – 5 June 1947
- Prime Minister: Władysław Sikorski; Stanisław Mikołajczyk; Tomasz Arciszewski
- Preceded by: Ignacy Mościcki
- Succeeded by: August Zaleski (in exile); Bolesław Bierut (in country)

3rd Marshal of the Senate
- In office 9 December 1930 – 3 October 1935
- President: Ignacy Mościcki
- Prime Minister: Walery Sławek; Aleksander Prystor; Janusz Jędrzejewicz; Leon Kozłowski; Walery Sławek
- Preceded by: Julian Szymański
- Succeeded by: Aleksander Prystor

Personal details
- Born: 28 January 1885 Kutaisi, Kutais Governorate, Russian Empire
- Died: 6 June 1947 (aged 62) Ruthin, Wales
- Resting place: Polish Aviators' Plot, Newark-on-Trent Cemetery
- Party: None (as President); BBWR (earlier)
- Spouse: Jadwiga Raczkiewicz

Władysław Raczkiewicz (Polish pronunciation: [vwaˈdɨswaf rat͡ʂˈkʲɛvit͡ʂ]; 28 January 1885 – 6 June 1947) was a Polish politician, lawyer, diplomat and President of Poland-in-exile from 1939 until his death in 1947. Until 1945, he was the internationally recognized Polish head of state, and the Polish government-in-exile was recognized as the continuation of the Polish government of 1939.

== Early life and studies ==
Władysław Raczkiewicz was born in Kutaisi, the second-largest city in Georgia, at that time part of the Russian Empire to Polish parents Józef Raczkiewicz, a court judge, and Ludwika Łukaszewicz. He studied in Saint Petersburg where he joined the Polish Youth Organization. After graduating from the Faculty of Law at the University of Dorpat he was employed as a lawyer in Minsk.

Upon the outbreak of World War I he served in the Russian Imperial Army, but after the Russian Revolution he joined the vanguard for Polish independence. He was active in the Union of Military Poles in Russia. Serving as the head of the Supreme Polish Military Committee, he helped create the Polish I Corps in Russia. Later he served under future Marshal and chief-of-state Józef Piłsudski, who created the Polish Legions that ultimately aided Poland in re-establishing its independence.

As a volunteer, he fought in the Polish–Soviet War between 1919 and 1920. At first, he supported the Endecja faction, later joined the Piłsudski-led Sanation camp. Raczkiewicz served as the Voivode of the Nowogródek Voivodeship from 1921 to 1924; government delegate to Wilno Land (1924–1925) and later as the voivodeship's voivode (1926–1931). After the 1930 Polish parliamentary election, he was appointed the Senate Marshal (1930–1935) and Voivode of Kraków Voivodeship in 1935, and Pomeranian Voivodeship from 1936 to 1939.

== World War II ==
When Poland was invaded by Nazi Germany in 1939, he escaped to Angers, France, where the Polish government-in-exile was established. He lived in the nearby Château de Pignerolle from 2 December 1939 until moving on 10 June 1940 to London, where he joined General Władysław Sikorski and Stanisław Mikołajczyk in the relocated Polish government-in-exile. He was an opponent of the Sikorski–Mayski agreement.

In February 1945, Joseph Stalin, Winston Churchill and Franklin D. Roosevelt held the Yalta Conference. The future of Poland was one of the main topics that were deliberated upon. Stalin claimed that only a strong, pro-Soviet government in Poland would be able to guarantee the security of the Soviet Union. As a result of the conference, the Allies agreed to withdraw their recognition of the Polish government-in-exile, after the formation of a new government on Polish territory.

Raczkiewicz died in exile in 1947, in the Welsh town of Ruthin. He was buried in the cemetery at Newark-on-Trent in England. In November 2022, the remains of Raczkiewicz, August Zaleski, and Stanisław Ostrowski were reburied at the Mausoleum for emigree presidents at the Temple of Divine Providence in Warsaw.

Political offices
Preceded by Bolesław Wieniawa-Długoszowski	President of the Polish Republic in exile 1939–1947	Succeeded by August Zaleski
Preceded by Ignacy Mościcki	Polish Head of State (Recognized by the Allies); 1939–1945	Succeeded by Bolesław Bierut (Chairman of the People's Council in Poland)
