= Tadeusz Tomaszewski (prime minister) =

Prime Minister of Poland

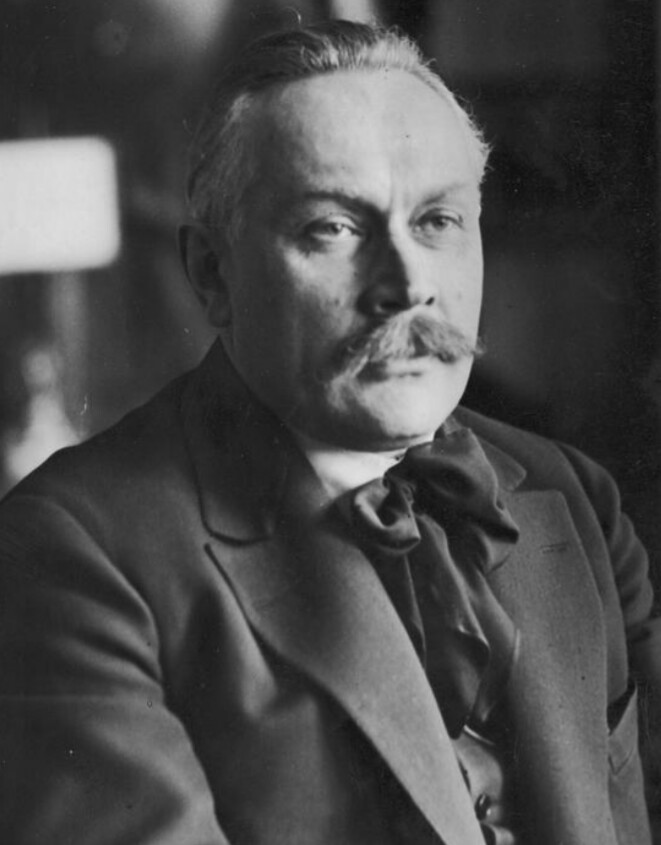
Tadeusz Tomaszewski

Tadeusz Tomaszewski (26 November 1881 in Sacin – 10 August 1950 in London) was 33rd Prime Minister of Poland and 3rd Prime Minister of the Polish Government in Exile (1949-1950). He died in London.

Political offices
Preceded by Tadeusz Bór-Komorowski	Prime Minister of the Polish Republic in Exile; 1949–1950	Succeeded by Roman Odzierzyński
