= Kozłowski cabinet =

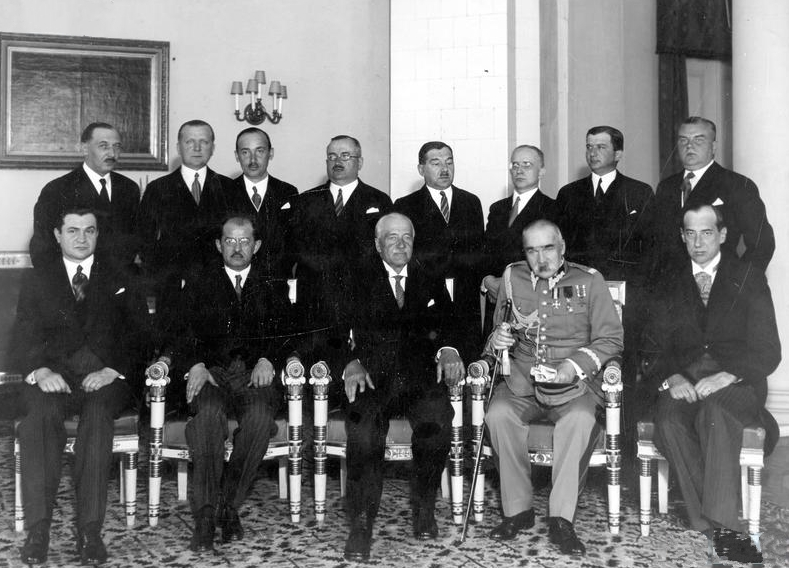
Kozłowski Cabinet with President Mościcki (first row, center). Kozłowski sit on the right from President and Piłsudski on left

Cabinet of Leon Kozłowski (Polish: Rząd Leona Kozłowskiego) - cabinet headed by Prime Minister Leon Kozłowski, appointed by President Ignacy Mościcki on May 15, 1934 and serving until its resignation on March 28, 1935.

- Leon Kozłowski (BBWR) - Prime Minister
- Józef Piłsudski - Minister of Military Affairs
- Bronisław Piernacki (BBWR) - Minister of Internal Affairs
- Józef Beck (BBWR) - Minister of Foreign Affairs
- Władysław Marian Zawadzki (BBWR) - Minister of the Treasury
- Czesław Michałowski - Minister of Justice
- Wacław Jędrzejewicz (BBWR) - Minister of Religions and Public Enlightenment
- Bronisław Nakoniecznikow-Klukowski - Minister of Agriculture and Rural Reforms
- Michał Butkiewicz - Minister of Transport
- Emil Kaliński - Minister of Post
- Henryk Floyar-Rajchman - Minister of Industry and Commerce
- Jerzy Paciorkowski - Minister of Labor and Public Services

Changes:

- June 16, 1934 - Prime Minister Kozłowski became Acting Minister of Internal Affairs in place on assassinated (on June 15) Piernacki
- June 28, 1934 - Juliusz Poniatowski replaced Nakoniecznikow-Klukowski as Minister of Agriculture
  Marian Zyndram-Kościałkowski became Minister of Internal Affairs
