= Tadeusz Bór-Komorowski =

Polish military leader (1895–1966)

General Tadeusz Komorowski
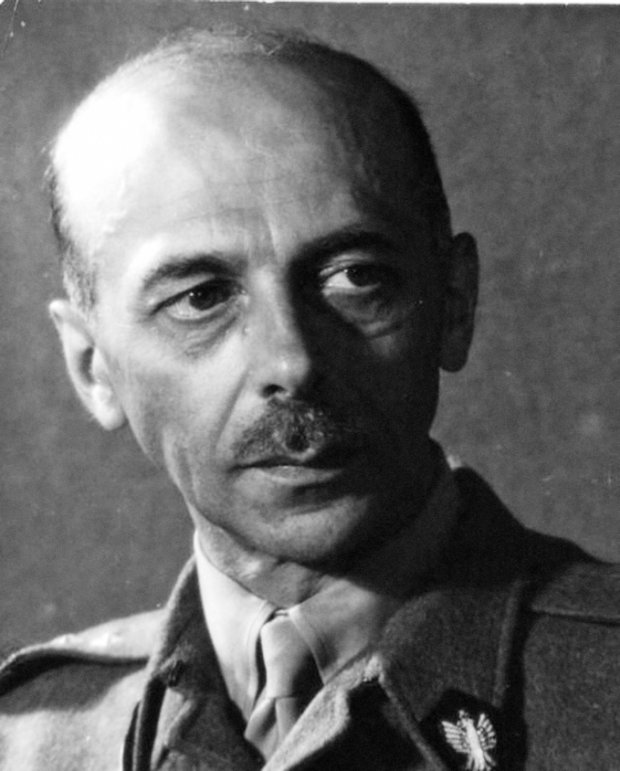
- Komorowski in 1945

4th Prime Minister of the Polish Government in Exile
- In office 2 July 1947 – 10 February 1949
- President: August Zaleski
- Preceded by: Tomasz Arciszewski
- Succeeded by: Tadeusz Tomaszewicz

5th General Inspector of the Armed Forces
- In office 30 September 1944 – 2 October 1944
- Preceded by: Kazimierz Sosnkowski
- Succeeded by: Władysław Anders (acting)

Personal details
- Born: 1 June 1895 Khorobriv, Kingdom of Galicia and Lodomeria, Austria-Hungary
- Died: 24 August 1966 (aged 71) London, England
- Profession: Soldier
- Awards: Order of the White Eagle (posthumously) Virtuti Militari Krzyz Zaslugi Polonia Restituta Cross of the Valorous
- Nickname: Bór

Military service
- Allegiance: Second Polish Republic Poland
- Branch/service: Austro-Hungarian Army Polish Legions Polish Army
- Years of service: 1913–1947
- Rank: Major general
- Unit: CO of the Home Army; C-i-C of the Polish Army
- Battles/wars: First World War; Polish-Ukrainian War; Bolshevik-Polish War; Second World War: Invasion of Poland; Operation Tempest; Warsaw Uprising

Generał Tadeusz Komorowski (1 June 1895 – 24 August 1966), better known by the name Bór-Komorowski (after one of his wartime code names: Bór – "The Forest") was a Polish military leader. He was appointed commander-in-chief a day before the capitulation of the Warsaw Uprising and following World War II, 32nd Prime Minister of Poland, 3rd Polish government-in-exile in London.

== Life ==
Komorowski was born in Khorobriv, in the Kingdom of Galicia and Lodomeria (the Austrian partition of Poland). In the First World War he served as an officer in the Austro-Hungarian Army, and after the war became an officer in the Polish Army, rising to command the Grudziądz Cavalry School. He was a member of the Polish equestrian team that went to the 1924 Summer Olympics.

After taking part in the fighting against the German invasion of Poland at the beginning of World War II in 1939, Komorowski, with the code-name Bór, helped organise the Polish underground in the Kraków area. In July 1941 he became deputy commander of the Home Army (Armia Krajowa or "AK"), and in March 1943 gained appointment as its commander, with the rank of Brigadier-General. He was sympathetic to the right-wing, antisemitic National Party. As commander of the Home Army, Komorowski reversed the pro-Jewish policies of his predecessor, Stefan Rowecki. Komorowski opposed aid to Jews seeking to mount ghetto uprisings and favoured the exclusion of Jews from the organisation. American historian Joshua D. Zimmerman accuses Komorowski of characterising Jewish partisans as "communist, pro-Soviet elements" and having "chilling indifference" to the ongoing Holocaust.

== The Uprising ==
In mid 1944, as Soviet forces advanced into central Poland, the Polish government-in-exile in London instructed Bór-Komorowski to prepare for an armed uprising in Warsaw. The government-in-exile wished to return to a capital city liberated by Poles, not seized by the Soviets, and prevent the Communist take-over of Poland which Stalin had planned. The Warsaw Uprising began on Komorowski's order on 1 August 1944 and the insurgents of the AK seized control of most of central Warsaw.

On 29 September 1944, Bór-Komorowski was promoted to General Inspector of the Armed Forces (Polish Commander-in-Chief). On 4 October, after two months of fierce fighting, Bór-Komorowski surrendered to SS-Obergruppenführer Erich von dem Bach-Zelewski after Nazi Germany agreed to treat the Home Army fighters as prisoners-of-war. General Bór-Komorowski went into internment in Germany (at Oflag IV-C). Despite repeated demands, he refused to order the remaining Home Army units in Occupied Poland to surrender.

== Life in exile ==
After the war Bór-Komorowski moved to London, where he played an active role in Polish émigré circles. From 1947 to 1949 he served as Prime Minister of the Polish government-in-exile, which no longer had diplomatic recognition from most Western European countries. He wrote the story of his experiences in The Secret Army (1950). After the war he was an upholsterer.

== Death ==
He died in London on 24 August 1966, aged 71, and was buried in Gunnersbury Cemetery (also known as (New) Kensington Cemetery).

On 30 July 1994, Gen. Tadeusz Bór-Komorowski's ashes were reburied in Powązki Military Cemetery in Warsaw.

== Honours and awards ==
- Order of the White Eagle (posthumously, 1995)
- Commander's Cross of the Order of Virtuti Militari (previously awarded the Knight's Cross, the Gold Cross and the Silver Cross)
- Grand Cross of the Order of Polonia Restituta (previously awarded the Officer's Cross)
- Cross of Valour – three times
- Gold Cross of Merit with Swords
- Gold Cross of Merit
- Silver Cross of Merit
- Honorary citizen of Glowno (posthumously, 2004)

== See also ==
- Operation Tempest
- Warsaw Uprising

== Notes ==
Political offices
Preceded by Tomasz Arciszewski	Prime Minister of the Polish Republic in Exile; 1947–1949	Succeeded by Tadeusz Tomaszewski
Military offices
Preceded by Stefan Rowecki	Commander of the Home Army; 1943–1944	Succeeded by Leopold Okulicki
Preceded by Kazimierz Sosnkowski	General Inspector of the Armed Forces; 1944–1946	Succeeded by Władysław Anders
