= Stanisław Mackiewicz =

Polish writer (1896–1966)

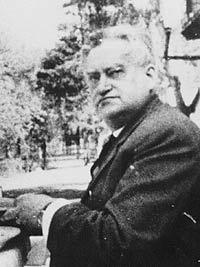
- Stanisław Mackiewicz

Prime Minister of Poland
- In exile 8 June 1954 – 21 June 1955 Serving with Józef Cyrankiewicz (in country)
- President: August Zaleski
- Preceded by: Jerzy Hryniewski
- Succeeded by: Hugon Hanke

Member of the Sejm
- In office 1928–1935

Personal details
- Born: 18 December 1896 Saint Petersburg, Russia
- Died: 18 February 1966 (aged 69) Warsaw, Poland
- Resting place: Powązki Cemetery, Warsaw
- Party: BBWR
- Occupation: Politician, writer

Stanisław "Cat" Mackiewicz (18 December 1896 in Saint Petersburg, Russia – 18 February 1966 in Warsaw, Poland) was a conservative Polish writer, journalist and monarchist.

The interwar journalist Adolf Maria Bocheński called him the foremost political journalist of the interbellum Second Polish Republic.

== Life ==
Mackiewicz was born into a Polish family that had historically used the Bożawola coat-of-arms.

Bożawola coat of arms

Mackiewicz joined the Polish Military Organisation in 1917 and served as a volunteer in the Polish Army during the Polish-Soviet War of 1919–21. He published and served as the editor-in-chief of the independent Wilno (Vilnius) periodical titled "Słowo," wholly financially supported by the noble families of the former Grand Duchy of Lithuania. He actively promoted the idea of the so-called Jagellonian Poland, i.e., return to the Polish–Lithuanian Commonwealth style of governance in Eastern Europe.

He supported Józef Piłsudski and in 1928–35 served as a deputy to the Sejm (Poland's parliament), representing the Piłsudskiite Nonpartisan Bloc for Cooperation with the Government.

In 1934, Mackiewicz participated in a highly-publicized duel against Witold Hulewicz, which was caused by the publication of caricatures of Hulewicz in the Vilnian Słowo newspaper whose editor-in-chief was Mackiewicz. The duel ended inconclusive as both were wounded.

After Piłsudski's death in 1935, Mackiewicz criticized the ruling elite and in 1939 was imprisoned for 17 days at the Bereza Kartuska detention camp.

On 18 September 1939, a day after the Soviet attack on eastern Poland during the Soviet-German Invasion of Poland, he left Poland.

Following the Yalta Conference and subsequent occupation by Stalin of Poland and the later establishment of the Communist Poland, Mackiewicz, like so many other political exiles, remained abroad and was politically active in the Polish émigré community. He served as prime minister of the Polish government-in-exile in 1954–55.

In 1956, Mackiewicz returned to Poland, where he continued writing under the pseudonym of Gaston de Cerizay. In 1964 he was one of the signatories of the so-called Letter of 34 to Prime Minister Józef Cyrankiewicz regarding freedom of culture.

He was the older brother of ardent enemy of the communist system, writer Józef Mackiewicz, and the uncle of Kazimierz Orłoś.

== Works ==
- Historja Polski od 11 listopada 1918 r. do 17 września 1939 r. (The History of Poland from 11 November 1918 to 17 September 1939), 1941, 1958, 1989, 1990, 1992
- Stanisław August, 1953, 1978, 1991, 1999, 2009
- Muchy chodzą po mózgu (Flies Walk the Brain), 1957
- Zielone oczy (Green Eyes), 1958, 1959, 1987
- Europa in flagranti (Europe in flagranti), 1965, 1975, 2000
- Odeszli w zmierzch: wybór pism, 1916–1966 (They Have Passed into the Twilight: a Collection of Writings, 1916–1966), 1968
- Kto mnie wołał, czego chciał... (Who Called Me, What He Wanted...), Instytut Wydawniczy "Pax" ("Pax" Publishing Institute), 1972
- Był bal (There Was a Ball), 1973
- Herezje i prawdy (Heresies and Truths), 1975
- Klucz do Piłsudskiego (The Key to Piłsudski), 1986, 1992, 1996
- Lata nadziei: 17 września 1939 – 5 lipca 1945 (Years of Hope: 17 September 1939 – 5 July 1945), 1990
- Myśl w obcęgach: studia nad psychologią społeczeństw sowietów (Thinking in a Vise: Studies on the Psychology of Soviet Societies), 1998
- Polityka Becka (Beck's Policies), 2009
- Teraz jestem tutaj. Albo może raczej nigdzie = Now I'm here. Or perhaps, rather, nowhere, edited by Tomasz Wiech and Maciej Zakrzewski. Kraków: IPN, 2014. Photographs taken in London from 1945 to 1956.

== See also ==
- List of Poles

== Notes ==
Political offices
| Preceded by Jerzy Hryniewski | Prime Minister of the Polish Republic in Exile; 1954–1955 | Succeeded by Hugon Hanke |
