= Kiszczak cabinet =

Czesław Kiszczak was appointed Prime Minister of the People's Republic of Poland by President Wojciech Jaruzelski on 2 August 1989, replacing Mieczysław Rakowski.

Kiszczak, however, failed to win support in parliament and thus was unable to form a cabinet. During his brief premiership, he headed a cabinet previously headed but then vacated by Rakowski.

On 17 August Kiszczak resigned and Jaruzelski named Tadeusz Mazowiecki on 20 August. Kiszczak served in his successor cabinet as Deputy Prime Minister and Minister for Internal Affairs.
