= Aleksander Zawisza =

Prime Minister of the Polish Government in Exile (1896–1977)

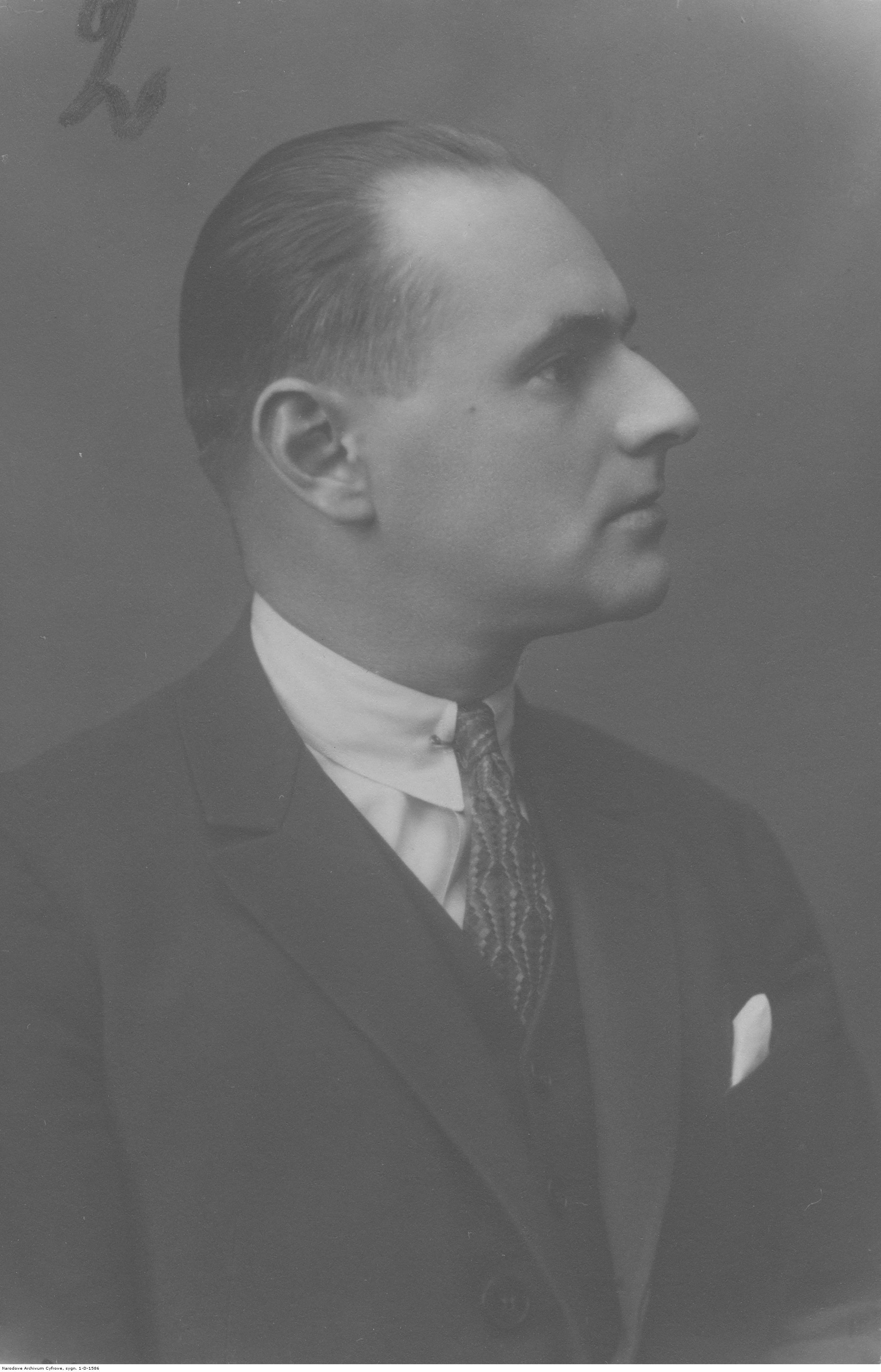
Aleksander Zawisza

Aleksander Zawisza (12 December 1896 – 28 March 1977) was the prime minister of the Polish Government in Exile from 25 June 1965 to 16 July 1970.

Previously the minister of foreign affairs, in 1959 he played a part in moving the wartime archives of the Ministry of Information and Documentation from the UK to the Hoover Institution at Stanford University.

| Preceded by Antoni Pająk | Prime Minister of the Polish Republic in Exile; 1965–1970 | Succeeded by Zygmunt Muchniewski |
