= Hugon Hanke =

Polish politician

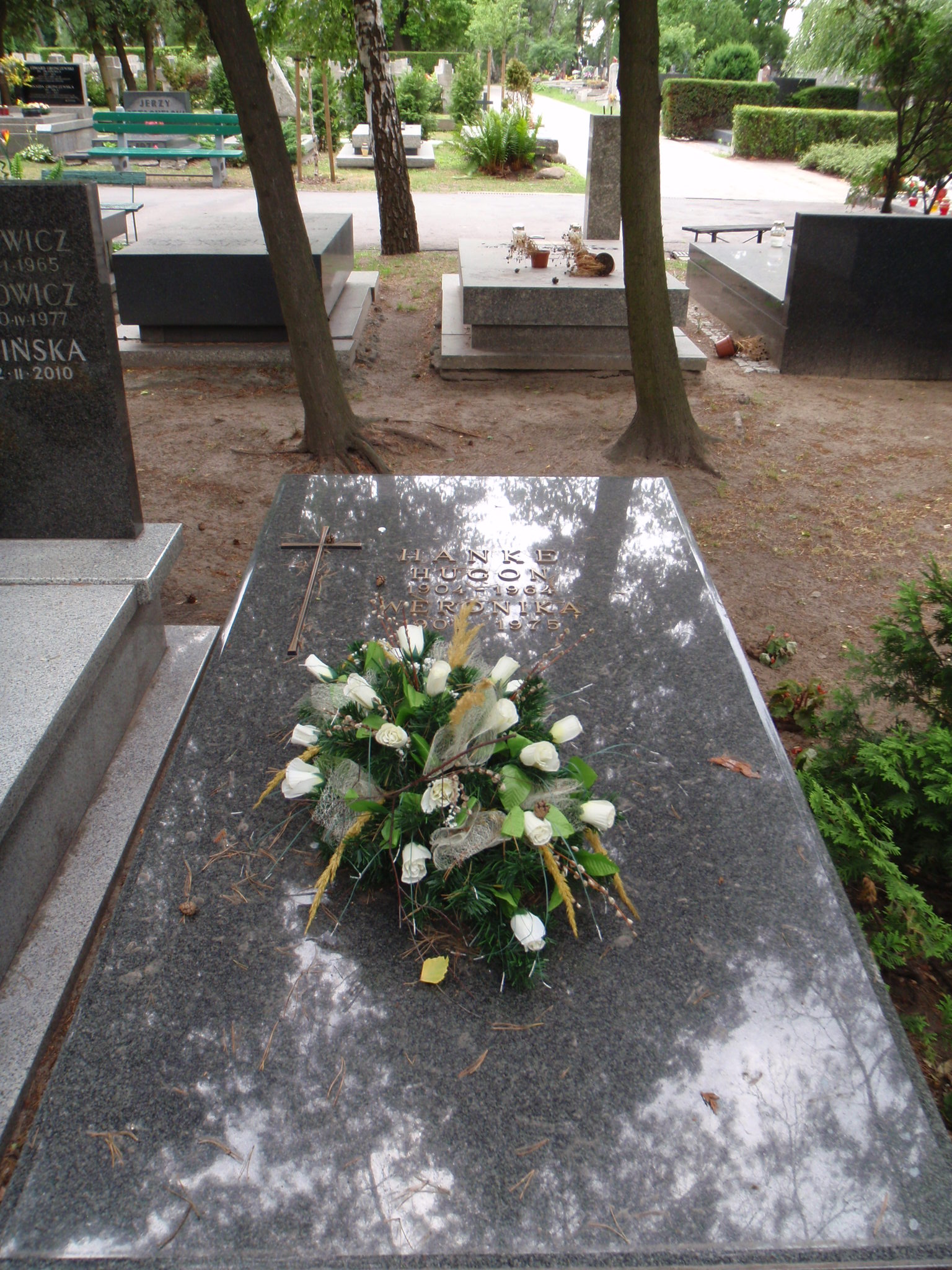
Grave of Hugon Hanke at the Powązki Military Cemetery in Warsaw

Hugon Hanke (26 March 1904 – 19 December 1964) was a Polish politician, best known for being 38th Prime Minister of Poland and 8th Prime Minister of the Republic of Poland in Exile (in 1955) and for his unexpected return to the Communist-ruled country while serving as PM.

He was involved in politics during the Second Polish Republic before World War II. He was an active member of the Christian Workers Union (Chrześcijańskie Związki Zawodowe) and of the Labour Party (Stronnictwo Pracy) in Silesia.

During the war he served as a soldier in the Polish army in the West.

After Prime Minister in Exile Stanisław Mackiewicz fled back to Poland, Hanke was named as his successor by President August Zaleski and served from 8 August to 10 September 1955.

Like his predecessor, he left London and fled to Poland.

== Hugon Hanke Government (8 August – 10 September 1955) ==
- Hugon Hanke - Prime Minister
- Kazimierz Okulicz - Minister of Justice
- Zygmunt Rusinek - Minister of Emigration Affairs
- Stanisław Sopicki - Minister of the Treasury, Labour and Trade
- General Michał Karaszewicz-Tokarzewski - Minister of National Defense and General Inspector of the Armed Forces
- Antoni Pająk - Minister of Congressional Works

Government offices
Preceded by Stanisław Mackiewicz	Prime Minister of the Republic of Poland in Exile; 1955	Succeeded by Antoni Pająk
