= Zygmunt Muchniewski =

Polish politician

Zygmunt Muchniewski (30 July 1896 – 5 January 1979) was a Polish politician who headed the Christian Democratic Party and was the prime minister of the Polish Government in Exile from 16 July 1970 to 14 July 1972.

He was awarded the Grand Ribbon in 1972.

Preceded by Aleksander Zawisza	Prime Minister of the Polish Republic in Exile; 1970–1972	Succeeded by Alfred Urbański
