= Antoni Pająk =

Polish socialist politician

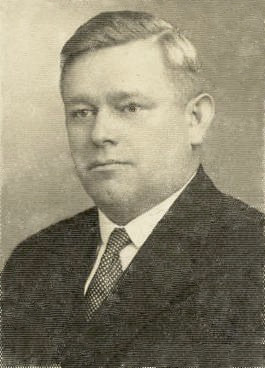
Antoni Pająk

Antoni Pająk (Polish pronunciation: [anˈtɔɲi ˈpajɔŋk]; 31 July 1893, Bestwina - 25 November 1965, London) was a Polish socialist (member of the Polish Socialist Party) politician, who served as 39th Prime Minister of Poland and 9th Prime Minister in exile for nearly ten years (1955-1965).

From 1914 until 1917 he was a member of Polish Legions, led by Józef Piłsudski. In later years (1918-1919) he served in new Polish Armed Forces, created after independence.

He joined PPS in 1919. From 1920 until 1937 he was a member of party leadership. He also served as Sejm Member from 1928 to 1930.

In 1940 he was arrested by Soviets and imprisoned in a labour camp in Siberia. After reestablishment of Polish-Soviet relations following Germany's attack on USSR, he was released and became diplomatic representative of the exile government in Sakha Republic. He was expelled in 1942 and was transported to Iran, where he was (1943-1945) a representative to Polish Armed Forces in exile. From Iran he moved to Mandate Palestine and finally to London.

He became an active politician in exile. From 10 September 1955 to 14 June 1965 he was a Prime Minister in exile. He died shortly after leaving office.

Preceded by Hugon Hanke	Prime Minister of the Republic of Poland in Exile; 1955-1965	Succeeded by Aleksander Zawisza
