= Roman Odzierzyński =

Polish politician

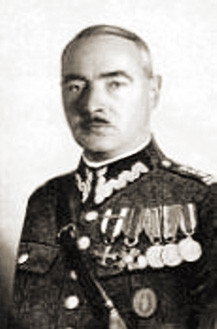
Roman Odzierzyński

Roman Władysław Odzierzyński (28 February 1892, Lwów – 9 July 1975, London) was a Polish politician. He was the 35th Prime Minister of Poland and 5th prime minister in the Polish Government in Exile from 1950 until 1953.

Following the Invasion of Poland, he fled with the army through Romania to France. He served as an artillery commander with the Polish Army in the East and the Polish II Corps, rising to the rank of brigadier general.

For his services, he was awarded the Grand Cross of the Order of Polonia Restituta.
