= Czesław Kiszczak =

Polish general and politician, 39th Prime Minister of Poland

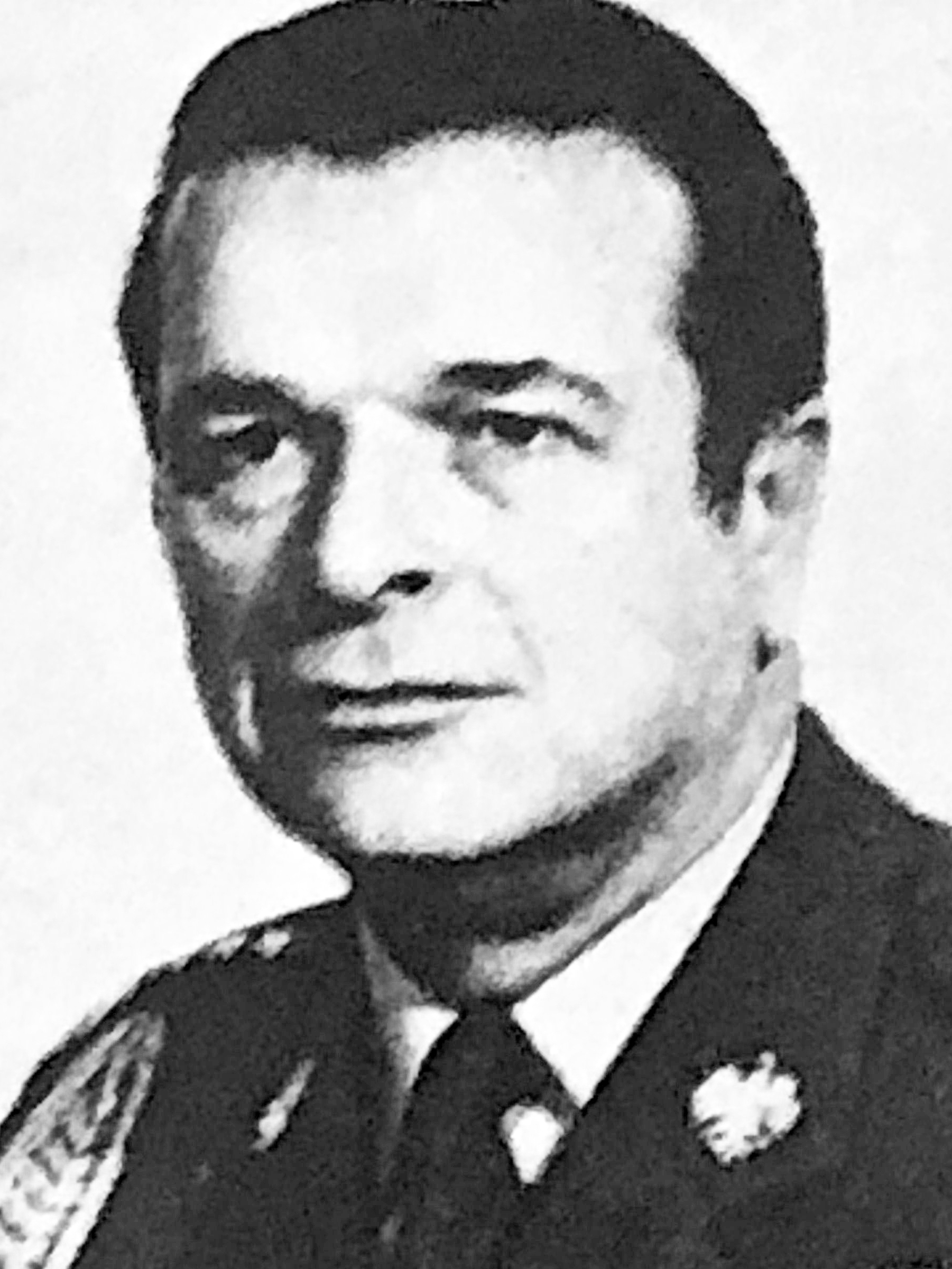
- Kiszczak in 1988

Prime Minister of Poland
- In office 2 August 1989 – 19 August 1989 Serving with Edward Szczepanik (in exile)
- President: Wojciech Jaruzelski
- Preceded by: Mieczysław Rakowski
- Succeeded by: Tadeusz Mazowiecki

Minister of Internal Affairs of Poland
- In office 31 July 1981 – 6 July 1990
- President: Wojciech Jaruzelski
- Prime Minister: Wojciech Jaruzelski; Zbigniew Messner; Mieczysław Rakowski; Himself; Tadeusz Mazowiecki
- Preceded by: Mirosław Milewski
- Succeeded by: Krzysztof Kozłowski

Personal details
- Born: 19 October 1925 Roczyny, Kraków Voivodeship, Second Polish Republic
- Died: 5 November 2015 (aged 90) Warsaw, Poland
- Resting place: Orthodox Cemetery (Warsaw)
- Party: Polish United Workers' Party
- Spouse: Maria Teresa Kiszczak
- Children: Ewa Kiszczak; Jarosław Kiszczak

Military service
- Allegiance: Poland
- Branch/service: Polish People's Army
- Years of service: 1945–1990
- Rank: Generał broni

Czesław Jan Kiszczak (Note: Polish pronunciation: [ˈt͡ʂɛswaf ˈkʲiʂt͡ʂak]) (19 October 1925 – 5 November 2015) was a Polish general, communist-era interior minister (1981–1990) and prime minister (1989).

In 1981 he played a key role in imposing martial law and suppression of the Solidarity movement in Poland. But eight years later he presided over the country's transition to democracy as its last communist prime minister and a co-chairman of the Round Table conference, in which officials of the ruling Polish United Workers' Party faced the democratic opposition leaders. The conference led to the reconciliation with and reinstatement of Solidarity, the 1989 elections, and the formation of Poland's first non-communist government since 1945.

== Early years ==
Czesław Kiszczak was born on 19 October 1925, in Roczyny, the son of a struggling farmer who was fired as a steelworker because of his communist affiliation. Due to his father's beliefs, young Czesław was brought up in an anti-clerical, pro-Soviet atmosphere.

During World War II, in 1942, when he was 16, Kiszczak was arrested by the German occupants with his mother, older brother and an aunt and sent for forced labour. At first Czesław was recruited at the German coal mine, but later was sent to Austria as a slave laborer. He was the only Pole among Croats, Serbs and others, many of whom were Communists. Towards the end of the war he was in Vienna, working on the Austrian train system until 7 April 1945. Then he joined a communist-led anti-Nazi resistance group which collaborated with the Red Army, showing the Russians around Vienna sitting on a tank. Because he knew Russian and German, he served as a translator.

== Military career ==
After the war Kiszczak returned to Poland, joined the communist Polish Workers' Party almost immediately, and was sent to the Central Party School in Łódź, which was training civilian and military Party apparatchiks. Kiszczak entered the Polish Army, where he fought guerrilla groups that were resisting the communist takeover. Guerrillas beat his father and spared his life only after his mother intervened. Kiszczak later explained that those struggles had shaped his response to the pro-democracy upheaval decades later: "Experiences linked with that drama, that fratricidal struggle, are among the major reasons that shaped my role in the complicated years of 1980–82", he said. "I did not want that tragic history to repeat itself".

Later he was commissioned and, considered too young for political work in the army, was assigned to military intelligence, serving there with short breaks until 1981. In 1946 he was sent to the Polish consulate-general in London, where his official task was to help repatriate members of the Polish armed forces who had served in the West during the war. His superiors found him a keen, highly motivated and disciplined young officer. In 1951 he became a chief of the Department of Information in the 18th Infantry Division stationed in the city of Ełk, and in 1952 was transferred to Warsaw where he took over the position of chief of the Department of Information in the Directorate of Information of Military District Number 1. Later Kiszczak was moved to the headquarters of the Ministry of National Defense, and became chief of the General Section in the Department of Finances.

In 1954–57 Kiszczak studied in the Polish General Staff Academy, and after the graduation was moved to the newly formed counter-intelligence agency, the Internal Military Service (WSW). From 1957 to 1965 he was the head of counter-intelligence for the Navy in the WSW, and in 1967 became deputy head of the WSW.

From the end of the 1960s Kiszczak occupied top positions in the Polish military and military intelligence services. In 1973 he was promoted to the rank of general. In 1972–79 he served as a head of military intelligence (Second Directorate of General Staff of the Polish Army - Zarząd II Sztabu Generalnego Wojska Polskiego). In 1978 he became deputy head of the Polish General Staff. In June 1979 Kiszczak returned to military counter-intelligence, and until 1981 was the head of the Internal Military Service.

== Interior minister ==
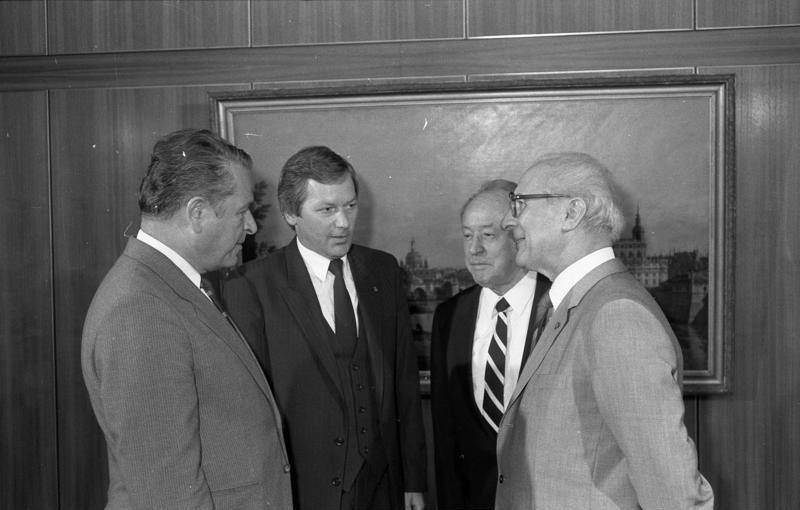
Kiszczak - SED chief Erich Honecker meeting 1988

In July 1981 Kiszczak was appointed minister of internal affairs. The Ministry of Internal Affairs, together with the Ministry of National Defense, were among the biggest and most powerful administrations in Poland, responsible for the police force, the secret police, government protection, confidential communications, supervision of local governments, correctional facilities and fire services.

In that position, Kiszczak participated in the preparation and implementation of the martial law that was declared in Poland on 13 December 1981. He became a member of the Military Council of National Salvation, a quasi-government administering Poland during the martial law (1981–83). In 1982 he became a deputy member of the Politburo of the Polish United Workers' Party and a full member in 1986. From December 1981 until June 1989 Kiszczak was the second most important person in Poland, after General Wojciech Jaruzelski, the nation's top leader. Together they orchestrated the crackdown aimed at crushing the Solidarity, the Eastern Bloc's first non-communist labor union movement. Martial law included the mass roundup and internment of Solidarity activists, curfews and other harsh measures.

Generals Kiszczak and Jaruzelski later insisted that they were imposing martial law to stave off a possible Soviet-led invasion in response to the Solidarity uprising, as it happened after a reform movement in Czechoslovakia in 1968 (the Prague Spring). "I saved the country from terrible troubles", Kiszczak said years later. But critics claimed Jaruzelski and Kiszczak were doing Moscow's bidding in a brutal crackdown that included the shooting deaths of nine protesting miners by the police during the Pacification of Wujek operation.

As internal affairs minister, Kiszczak was responsible for the coverup of Grzegorz Przemyk's death, after his severe beating by two police officers in 1983. The court files of the case preserved his handwritten note ordering the prosecution to "only stick to one version of the investigation - the paramedics", which resulted in a doctor and a paramedic falsely convicted and imprisoned for over a year as part of the cover-up as part of a show trial. In 1984 Kiszczak granted financial awards to the policemen who coordinated the cover-up. During the trial in postcommunist Poland in 1997, one of the officers, who had participated in the beating, was eventually brought to justice, another acquitted, but Kiszczak was not on trial and avoided any punishment for his role in masterminding the coverup of the crime.

At the end of the 1980s, with the huge geopolitical changes brought by four years of Gorbachev's perestroika in the Soviet Union and with Polish economy deteriorating, Kiszczak negotiated the Polish Round Table Agreement with the opposition that led to the renewed recognition of Solidarity and the terms for the 1989 elections. Solidarity candidates went on to win nearly all the seats in the National Assembly that they were permitted to contest.

Kiszczak was appointed prime minister in 1989, but Solidarity refused to enter a communist-led government. Within a few weeks, to avert further labor unrest ignited by soaring food prices, he resigned and joined a Solidarity-dominated coalition as deputy prime minister and interior minister. He served until mid-1990, when he retired from political life.

== Later years ==
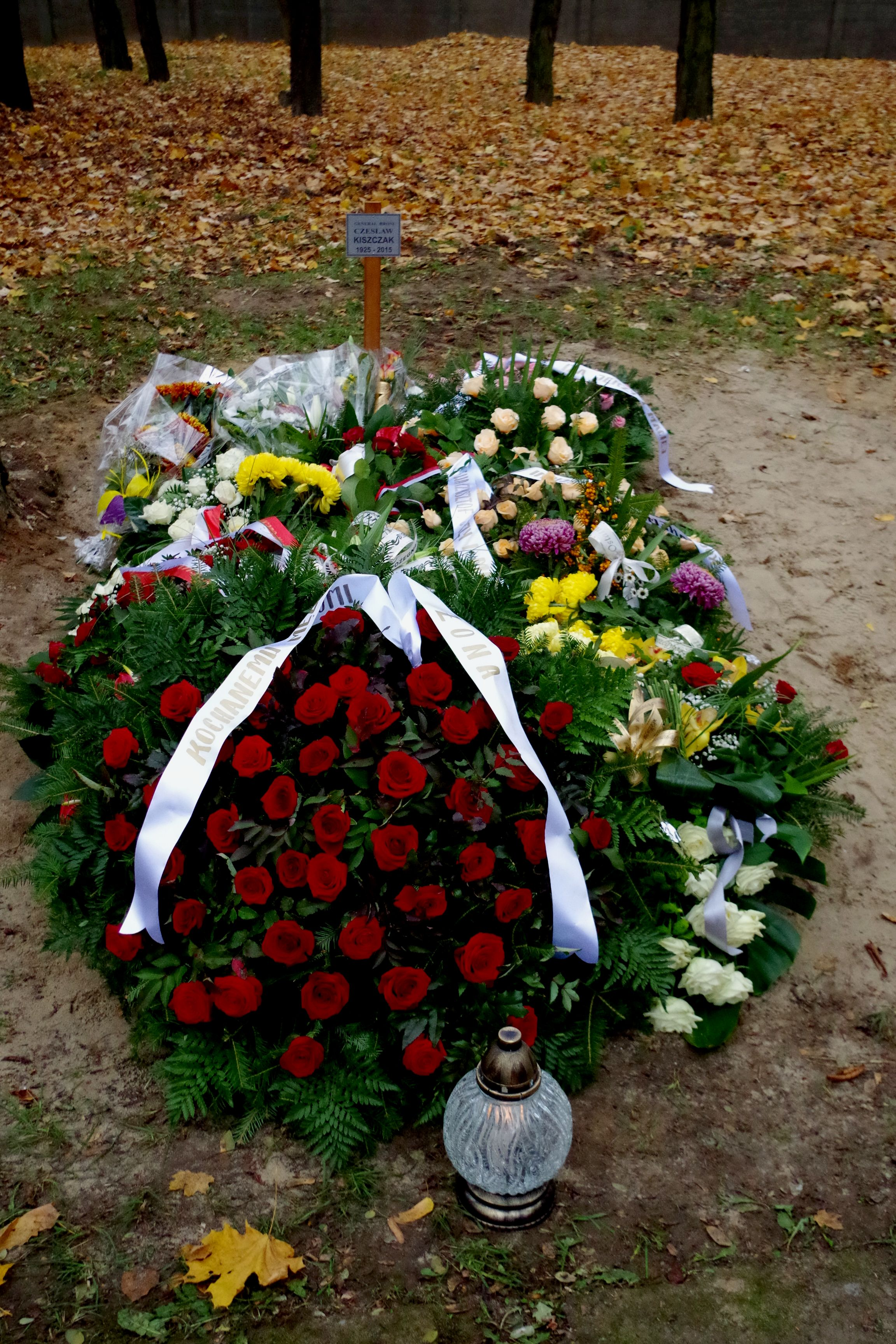
General Kiszczak's grave (November 2015)

Kiszczak (as well as Jaruzelski) remains one of the most controversial figures in contemporary Polish history, with fierce debates taking place about whether he was a patriot or a traitor. His critics hate him for the communist-era repressions that caused the suffering of many Poles and have accused him of acting in the interests of Moscow. But other Poles praise Kiszczak for relinquishing power without violence and point out that he deserves credit for eventually opening a dialogue with Solidarity and its leader Lech Wałęsa in the Round Table talks that led to partially free elections in 1989 and the end of communism in Poland. To some critics, Kiszczak redeemed himself already in 1984 when, as minister of internal affairs, he oversaw the prosecution and conviction of secret police officers who had abducted and murdered a pro-Solidarity priest, Jerzy Popiełuszko.

Many Poles found it frustrating that Kiszczak never faced punishment for martial law and other repressive measures, while some lower level police officers have faced convictions. In the 25 years after reestablishment of democracy in Poland, Kiszczak was tried in court a number of times for his role in imposing martial law, but he never served prison time. One of the most serious accusations against him was connected to the martial law killings of nine miners during the pacification of Wujek coalmine. Kiszczak was acquitted in these killings and was handed only a two-year suspended sentence for his role in imposing martial law.

Kiszczak died in Warsaw on 5 November 2015 at the age 90, due to heart problems. The Polish Ministry of Defence refused to allot a burial plot for him at the Powązki Military Cemetery or provide military funeral honors. The general is buried at the Orthodox Cemetery in Warsaw in the presence of his family members and friends. There was no government or military official participation in the ceremony.

Kiszczak was survived by his wife Maria, economist and university professor, and children Ewa and Jarosław.

== Legacy ==
Kiszczak's influence has continued long after his passing due to a political scandal arising from secret documents found in the possession of his wife. In February 2016 the couple's home was subjected to a search warrant which uncovered documents supporting the accusations of collaboration with the secret services by Lech Wałęsa. Apparently Kiszczak had kept secret dossiers in his personal possession containing evidence of Wałęsa's alleged collaboration, including signed documents using his purported codename Bolek. Maria Kiszczak was accused of attempting to sell these documents. Wałęsa has been dogged by such accusations for decades but has consistently claimed innocence and has never been formally found guilty of wrongdoing.

== Honours ==
- Order of the Builders of People's Poland (1984)
- Order of the Banner of Labour, I class
- Commander's Cross of Order of Polonia Restituta (1972)
- Knight's Cross of Order of Polonia Restituta
- Order of the Cross of Grunwald, III class
- Medal of the 10th Anniversary of People's Poland (1954)
- Medal of the 30th Anniversary of People's Poland (1974)
- Medal of the 40th Anniversary of People's Poland (1984)
- Gold Medal of the Armed Forces in the Service of the Fatherland
- Silver Medal of the Armed Forces in the Service of the Fatherland
- Bronze Medal of the Armed Forces in the Service of the Fatherland
- Gold Medal of Merit for National Defence
- Silver Medal of Merit for National Defence
- Bronze Medal of Merit for National Defence
- Grunwald Badge
- Silver Badge of Merit for Law Enforcement
- Bronze Badge of Merit for Law Enforcement
- Bronze Badge of Merit for Border Protection of PRL
- Order of the Patriotic War, I class (USSR)
- Medal "For Strengthening of Brotherhood in Arms" (USSR)

== Bibliography ==
- Bereś, Witold [in Polish]; Skoczylas, Jerzy [in Polish] (1991). Generał Kiszczak mówi. Prawie wszystko [General Kiszczak speaks. Almost everything] (in Polish). Warsaw: Polska Oficyna Wydawnicza "BGW". ASIN B004UV29OA. LCCN 92162994. OL 1298580M.

== See also ==
Kiszczak archives - a batch of historical documents, including the Security Service file on secret informant Bolek, which was discovered in Kiszczak's house after his death

Government offices
Preceded by Mirosław Milewski	Minister of Internal Affairs; 1981–1990	Succeeded by Krzysztof Kozłowski
Preceded by Mieczysław Rakowski	Prime Minister of Poland; 1989	Succeeded by Tadeusz Mazowiecki
