= Edward Bernard Raczyński =

Polish politician (1891–1993)

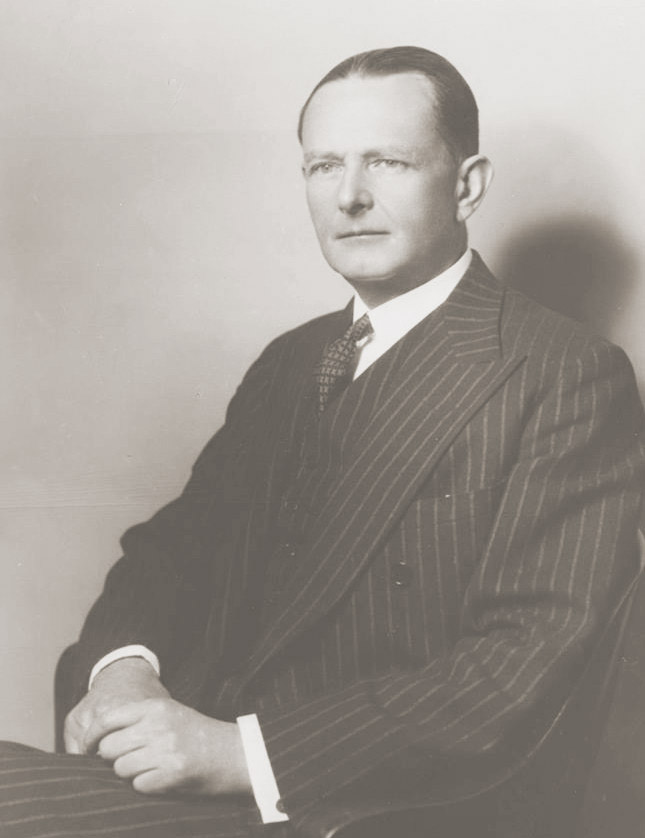

President of Poland
- in-exile 8 April 1979 – 8 April 1986
- Prime Minister: Kazimierz Sabbat
- Head of State in country: Henryk Jabłoński; Wojciech Jaruzelski
- Preceded by: Stanisław Ostrowski
- Succeeded by: Kazimierz Sabbat

Minister of the Foreign Affairs of the Republic of Poland
- In exile 22 August 1941 – 14 July 1943
- President: Władysław Raczkiewicz
- Prime Minister: Władysław Sikorski, Stanisław Mikołajczyk
- Preceded by: August Zaleski
- Succeeded by: Tadeusz Romer

Poland Ambassador to the United Kingdom
- In office 1 November 1934 – 5 July 1945
- Appointed by: Ignacy Mościcki
- Monarch: George V Edward VIII; George VI
- Preceded by: Konstanty Skirmunt
- Succeeded by: Henryk Strasburger

Personal details
- Born: 19 December 1891 Zakopane, Austria-Hungary (now Poland)
- Died: 30 July 1993 (aged 101) London, United Kingdom
- Party: Independent
- Spouse(s): Lady Joyous Markham (died); Cecylia Jaroszyńska (died); Aniela Lilpop
- Profession: Politician, Diplomat, Writer

Count Edward Bernard Raczyński (19 December 1891 – 30 July 1993) was a Polish diplomat, writer, and politician who served as President of Poland-in-exile (between 1979 and 1986).

He was the longest living (101), and the oldest serving Polish President (from the age of 87 to 94).

== Biography ==
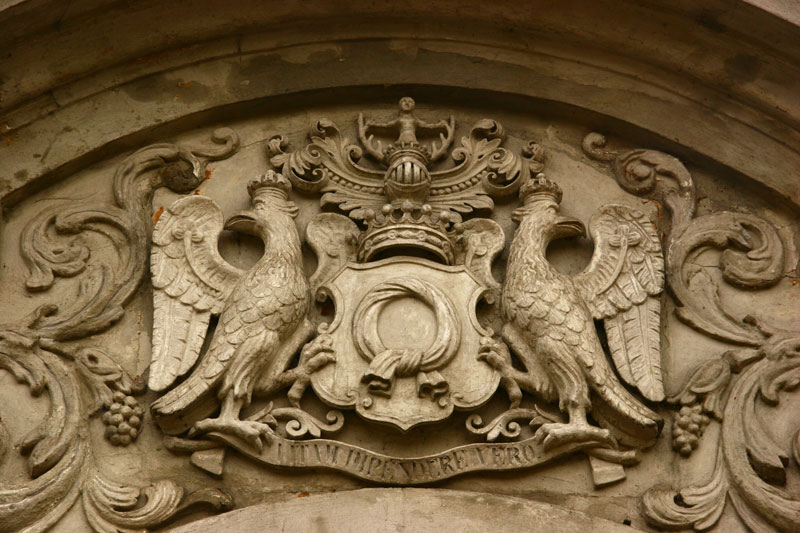
Relief of the Raczyński family comital coat of arms

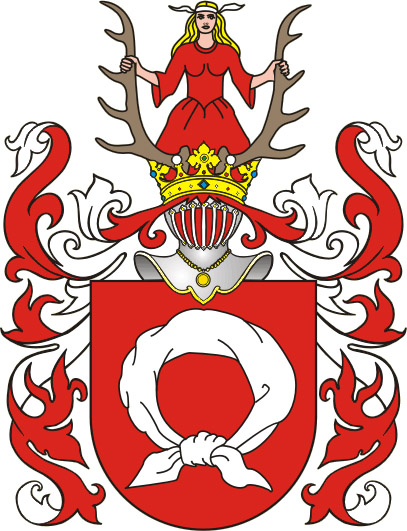
Nalecz coat of arms

Count Edward Bernard Maria Raczyński was born on 19 December 1891 in Zakopane to a Polish aristocratic family, the younger son of Count Edward Aleksander Raczyński of Nałęcz coat of arms, and his wife, Countess Róża Potocka. The Raczyńskis were related to the Austro-Hungarian house of Habsburgs. The full name was "Raczyński z Małyszyna", as they were a branch of the noble family Nałęcz-Małyski from Greater Poland (the area of the town of Wieluń) and about 1540 took their name from the estate of Raczyn near Wieluń. However, the Raczyńskis remained relatively unknown until the 18th century. Raczyńskis were a bookish family who had long been known for using their great wealth to serve patrons of the arts. Following his family's traditions, Raczyński was a well known bibliophile who was well read on a number of subjects.

Raczyński spent most of his childhood in Kraków, in the family palace in Pod Baranami and in the family palace in Rogalin in Greater Poland. He studied law in Leipzig, Kraków, and London (the London School of Economics) and was awarded a doctorate by the Jagiellonian University in Kraków in 1915. In November 1918, Raczynski joined the army of the resurrected Poland, from which he was called to the diplomatic service in May 1919. Until 1925, he worked in Polish embassies and missions in Bern, Copenhagen and London. Back in Warsaw, he became the head of the department of international agreements. In 1932, Raczyński was appointed Polish ambassador to the League of Nations and in 1934, he became the ambassador of the Republic of Poland in the United Kingdom.

Both the British government and the British public at large tended to view Anglo-Polish relations through the prism of Anglo-German relations. In the interwar period, the Treaty of Versailles was widely felt in Britain to be too harsh towards Germany, and the British government tended to sympathise with Germany's demands for the return of the Free City of Danzig (modern Gdańsk), the Polish Corridor and Upper Silesia. The British Foreign Secretary Sir Austen Chamberlain had pursued the Locarno treaty of 1925 largely to facilitate German revanchism in Eastern Europe peacefully. France had signed a defensive alliance with Poland in 1921 and with Czechoslovakia in 1924, which were meant to deter German invasions of both states. Chamberlain believed that if Franco-German relations were improved, then France would abandon its allies in Eastern Europe, which in turn would force Poland and Czechoslovakia into the German sphere of influence, as both states would have no Great Power protector such as France anymore. Raczyński himself noted right from the moment that he arrived in London as ambassador that Poland was not a nation that British officials liked very, and the British historian Adam Zamoyski wrote that Raczyński "mobilised all the reserves of his breeding, sense of humour and immense personal charm" to champion Poland's case. Zamoyski noted: "Although he was vivacious and surprisingly active, even in his nineties, Raczynski was not a forceful personality."

The two British politicians whom Raczyński was most close to were Sir Samuel Hoare and Winston Churchill. However, the reasons for the interest of Hoare and Churchill differed. Hoare was an ardent appeaser who favoured a deal under which Poland would allow the Free City of Danzig to rejoin Germany while returning the Polish Corridor and Upper Silesia to the Reich. Churchill, by contrast, favoured a "Grand Alliance" against Nazi Germany. A major aim of the Polish Foreign Minister Colonel Józef Beck was to win Poland an empire in Africa. Raczyński closely followed the talks concerning the German demand for the return of the former German colonial empire in Africa, which he hoped might establish a basis for Poland receiving an African colony. In June 1936, Raczyński reported to Warsaw that the plans by Labour and Liberal MPs for the League of Nations to play a greater role in the ruling of the German colonies held by Britain as mandates was "a red cloth for the imperialist group of Conservatives, the so-called "die hards"" who wanted to annex the former German colonies as British colonies.

=== The Danzig crisis ===
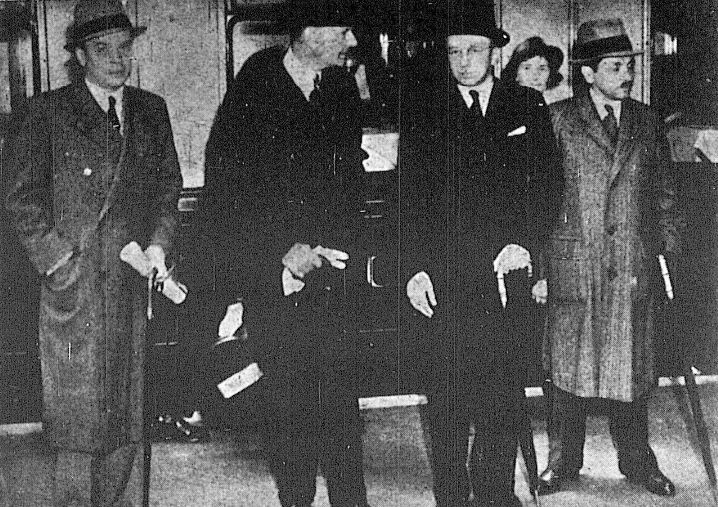
Raczyński with Adam Koc, the president of the Bank of Poland in London during the talks for a British loan to Poland, June 1939.

During the Sudetenland crisis of 1938, Raczyński reported to his superior, the Foreign Minister Colonel Józef Beck, that Poland's stance in pressing its claim to the disputed Teschen region had made a negative impression both with the British government and the British public. The Polish historian Anita J. Prazmowska wrote that, despite the way that the government of Neville Chamberlain had favoured the German claim to the Sudetenland region of Czechoslovakia, the Chamberlain cabinet regarded Poland's actions in pressing its claims to the Teschen region of Czechoslovakia as a treacherous and base action. Reflecting Beck's interest in an African empire, Raczyński was in close contact with Charles Theodore Te Water, the South African high commissioner in London as South Africa was deeply involved in the colonial talks with Germany as South Africa held the former colony of German South West Africa (modern Namibia) as a League of Nations mandate. In November 1938, Raczyński closely followed the visit of the South African defence minister Oswald Pirow, who arrived in Europe with the aim of effecting a colonial deal that would lead to an Anglo-German alliance. Pirow had been sent by the South African prime minister J. B. M. Hertzog to offer up a deal under which Germany would take over the African colonies of some of the weaker European such as Portugal and Belgium, in exchange for Germany renouncing its claim to Southwest Africa, which Hertzog hoped to annex to South Africa. Raczyński reported that the meeting between Pirow and Hitler at the Reich Chancellery on 24 November 1938 did not go well as Hitler continued to insist that he wanted back all of the African colonies the Reich had ruled in 1914.

On 9 December 1938, the British Foreign Secretary Lord Halifax told Raczyński that he wanted to see the League of Nations end its role as the protector of the current status of the Free City of Danzig (modern Gdańsk) by 16 January 1939. The United Kingdom was one of the veto-holding permanent members of the League Council (the executive arm of the League analogous to the Security Council of the United Nations) and thus had much say in the running of the League. The decision to have Carl Jacob Burckhardt, the League of Nations high commissioner for Danzig, pull out created much alarm in Warsaw, as the end of the League's role in protecting Danzig's status would end international involvement in the Danzig question and reduce the issue to a bilateral German-Polish dispute. Raczyński protested very strongly that Poland wanted the League to continue its role in Danzig and succeeded in having the question postponed. In response to Polish protests, the League Council ruled that Burckhardt would stay on as the League of Nations High Commissioner for Danzig until at least late 1939. Anglo-Polish relations were distinctly unfriendly in the first months of 1939. Raczyński reported to Warsaw on 8 February 1939 that the Chamberlain cabinet seemed to accept all of Eastern Europe as being in the German sphere of influence and stated that Chamberlain had a strong dislike of the Soviet Union. Raczyński wrote "one could risk the statement that by this "forgetting" of the Soviets, Prime Minister Chamberlain was flirting with the German partner". On 1 March 1939, Raczyński in a dispatch to Warsaw wrote the Chamberlain government was increasing its military estimates to Parliament, but stated that Chamberlain was still committed to appeasement with the increased defence spending merely being a bargaining tool with the Reich. Raczyński reported that based on his sources within the British government that Chamberlain was primarily concerned about Adolf Hitler's demand that Britain return the former German African colonies administered by Britain as mandates for the League of Nations. Raczyński expressed concern that Chamberlain might strike a deal with Hitler under which Britain would recognise Eastern Europe as being in the German sphere of influence in exchange for the Reich renouncing its claim to its former colonies in Africa. On the other hand, Raczyński predicated that if Britain and Germany failed to reach a settlement on the issue of former German colonies in Africa, then Britain would be more friendly towards Poland as a counterweight to Germany. Raczyński concluded that the future of Anglo-Polish relations depended upon whatever Britain and Germany could reach a settlement over the issue of the former German colonies in Africa. He reported that the failure of the Pirow mission indicated increasing Anglo-German tension over the colonial question, which led him to predict that Britain would soon be interested in Poland.

In March 1939, the "Tilea Affair" led to increased Anglo-German tensions as the Romanian minister in London, Viorel Tilea, claimed that Romania was on the brink of a German invasion. Germany had no source of oil of its own (though German scientists were working on a project to build refineries for artificial oil) and Germany's need to import oil from abroad left the Reich very vulnerable to a British naval blockade. From the British perspective, if Germany were to occupy Romania, it would have its own source of oil that would make it immune to a British naval blockade, hence Tilea's claims of an imminent German invasion caused much alarm in London. The defence policies of the Chamberlain government and the Baldwin government before it had been based on the "limited liability" doctrine, on which the bulk of British defence spending was to go to the Royal Air Force, to be followed by the Royal Navy and the British Army to be placed last. Under the "limited liability" doctrine, the British Army was to serve as a glorified colonial police force, just strong enough to put down uprisings in the colonies of the British Empire and would be too small to ever make the "continental commitment" (sending a large expeditionary force to the continent of Europe) again. As a result of the "limited liability" doctrine, the British Army was far too limited, small and underfunded to face the Wehrmacht, and as such Britain would need help to save Romania. As such, the British government asked Poland to save Romania. Romania and Poland had signed a defensive alliance in 1921 directed against the Soviet Union, but it remained unclear if Poland would go to war if Germany invaded Romania. France and Romania had signed a defensive alliance in 1926, but it was widely acknowledged that the French Army would remain behind the Maginot Line in the event of war, which would not stop the Reich from overrunning Romania. At a cabinet meeting on 18 March 1939, Lord Halifax pressed for Britain to save Romania, while the Minister of the coordination of defence, Admiral Ernle Chatfield, stated the British Army was too weak to do anything for Romania and that the only nations that could save Romania were Poland and the Soviet Union. The British government sent out appeals to the governments of Poland, the Soviet Union, Greece, Yugoslavia and Turkey asking to join some sort of an alliance to protect Romania.

The need for Polish support for Romania led to the British taking an interest in the Danzig crisis. On 21 March 1939, Lord Halifax presented to Raczyński a note stating in regard to the Danzig crisis: "That His Majesty's government should consent, as an exceptional measure in view of the special circumstances, to the conclusion of a confidential bilateral understanding between the two countries by which the two governments would undertake to act in accordance with the terms of the proposed declaration, as supplemented by the interpretation which I had given to the Ambassador; at a previous consultation as regards in particular, the question of Danzig". Halifax asked that Raczyński not inform the French ambassador, Charles Corbin, of this offer, saying he wanted to keep this matter secret from the French. Halifax added to Raczyński: "If Poland and Germany could settle the Danzig question by direct negotiations so much the better; but if the Danzig question should develop in such a way as to involve a threat to Polish independence then this would be a matter of the gravest concern to ourselves". Beck had ordered Raczyński to not engage in any gesture that might worsen German-Polish relations. With Romania seeming on the brink of a German invasion, both the British and the French were keen to have allies to deter Germany from invading. The French Foreign Minister Georges Bonnet, who was visiting London, told Lord Halifax that the Romanians would accept aid from the Soviet Union if Poland were also involved, a viewpoint also shared by Raczyński. King Carol II told the British minister in Bucharest, Sir Reginald Hoare, that he would rather see his kingdom conquered by Germany than accept Soviet aid, though he did say he would be willing to accept aid from Poland if Germany invaded Romania. King Carol's statement that he was only willing to accept aid from Poland vastly increased the importance of Poland in British diplomacy. Colonel Beck was highly suspicious of the British offer because one of the states in the projected "peace front" was the Soviet Union and because he still believed it was possible for Poland and Germany to peacefully settle the Danzig crisis. However, at the same time, the increasing threatening statements from the German Foreign Minister Joachim von Ribbentrop saying that it would be war if Poland refused to allow the Free City to "go home to the Reich" led Beck on 22 March 1939 to tell Raczyński to see if was possible to reach an agreement with the British.

On 23 March 1939, Beck's chef de cabinet, Michael Łubieński, told Raczyński that the British offer of help in the Danzig crisis should be treated with caution, as he believed that the "peace front" was more likely to cause a German-Polish war than stop it, and because Poland did not want any sort of alliance with the Soviet Union. On 24 March 1939, Raczyński submitted to Lord Halifax a proposal asking for Anglo-Polish "consultation" in response to any threat to the security of Poland, which was rejected by Lord Halifax, who wanted a firm Polish commitment to save Romania. On 31 March 1939, Chamberlain announced in the House of Commons the famous British "guarantee" of Poland, stating that Britain would go to war if the independence of Poland was threatened, though Chamberlain notably excluded the frontiers of Poland from the "guarantee". On 1 April 1939, Raczyński submitted to Sir Orme Sargent of the Foreign Office a note protesting on behalf of Poland that the "guarantee" was "so worded as to give perhaps the wrong impression to those who wished to minimise its importance". In particular, Raczyński complained about that "paragraph 2 of the Prime Minister's statement might be so distorted as to actually weaken and undermine the position of the Polish government vis-à-vis Germany. It seemed to suggest that there were large and urgent questions in dispute between the two countries and that immediate negotiations were necessary and desirable in order that they should be settled". Raczyński was especially concerned as the Evening Standard, a newspaper owned by the "press baron" Lord Beaverbrook pointed out in an article published on the front page on 1 April 1939 that the "guarantee" was of Polish independence, not of Poland's territorial integrity. The article went on to say the crisis could still be settled by Poland accepting the German demands for the return of Danzig and extraterritorial roads through the Polish Corridor, and perhaps even the return of the Polish Corridor to Germany. When Raczyński complained to the diplomatic correspondent of the Evening Standard about the article, he was told it was published on the orders of Lord Beaverbrook himself, who based on information from sources in 10 Downing Street.

Lord Beaverbrook was a megalomaniacal Canadian millionaire businessman turned British media magnate who owned a chain of newspapers, the most successful of which was the Daily Express, the most popular newspaper in the United Kingdom at the time. Beaverbrook was a self-proclaimed "empire isolationist" who thought Britain should be concerned with the British Empire and was otherwise hostile towards any involvement with the wider world. Raczyński frequently complained that the Beaverbrook newspapers were relentlessly hostile towards Poland, which was depicted in the Beaverbrook newspapers as a miserable, backward, poor Eastern European country whose fate was no concern of Britain's.

Colonel Beck chose to visit London to meet Chamberlain and Halifax on 3 April 1939, and Raczyński served as his guide and translator as Colonel Beck spoke no English to London. The highlight of the trip was a visit to Buckingham Palace to see King George IV and the rest of the royal family. The meetings with Halifax and Chamberlain went less satisfactory. The British suggestion that the association of Poland, Britain and France serve as the "nucleus" for a wider "peace front" against aggression in Europe was vetoed by Beck who had no interest in Poland joining a "peace front". Beck told Chamberlain and Halifax that Poland would do nothing if Germany invaded Romania and made it quite clear that he no interest in any alliance that might involve the Soviet Union under any conditions. Beck on the whole was not keen to have Britain involved in the Danzig crisis, fearing that as the Sudetenland crisis, the British would lean on the Poles for concessions to Germany just they had leaned on the Czechoslovaks for concessions, and it was only the threatening statements from Ribbentrop that led him to seek any British involvement. In particular, Beck feared to allow Danzig to rejoin Germany would only lead to demands that the Polish Corridor and Upper Silesia be returned to Germany as well. During the meeting on 10 Downing Street with Chamberlain and Halifax on 3 April 1939, Raczyński stated by pressing for talks with Germany "the British government exhibits its ignorance of the actual state of affairs". Beck and Raczyński saw the British guarantee of Poland as a way to gain "a powerful ally" as Beck phrased it that would deter Germany from resorting to war and were not interested in the British plans for a "peace front" to form a wider alliance of states to resist aggression.

The principal problem with Poland in the arms race with Germany was the far greater size of the German economy. Germany was the world's second largest economy and as thus the Reich could afford a level of military spending that was far greater than what Poland was capable of. For example, the total Polish defence spending in the five years 1934–1939 for the Army, Navy and Air Force combined amounted to just one-tenth of the Luftwaffe's budget for the year 1939. As the United Kingdom was the world's third largest economy, Raczyński urged that Poland use its new alliance with Britain to furnish Poland with a loan that might allow Poland to catch up with the Reich in the arms race. In addition, the Polish Finance Minister Eugeniusz Kwiatkowski complained on 26 April 1939 to Count Jan Szembek, the deputy secretary of the Ministry of Foreign Affairs, that the costs of keeping the Polish military semi-mobilised, which had been the case since late March 1939 – was bankrupting Poland. The British embassy in Warsaw estimated that the costs of semi-mobilisation were £2 million per month. Colonel Beck, out of a sense of pride, did not want to ask Britain for a loan and it was the British Foreign Office that first raised the subject of a British loan to assist Poland, both with the costs of keeping the Polish military semi-mobilised and with the arms race on 27 April 1939. In early May 1939, Beck grudgingly ordered Raczyński to ask the British for a loan. On 12 May 1939, Raczyński met with Sir William Strang to ask for a £66 million loan. Raczyński wanted an immediate £24 million in gold to buy arms outside of Britain. In April 1939, Britain had finally made the "continental commitment" by agreeing to send a large expeditionary force and abandoning the "limited liability" defence doctrine. The Chiefs of Staff argued that the Polish request for arms would interfere with the massive needs necessitated by making the "continental commitment". The Chiefs of Staff saw little value in Polish rearmament anyhow, putting Poland 9th on the list of states requiring British arms, behind Egypt, Iraq, Belgium, Portugal, Turkey, Greece, the Netherlands and Romania.

Raczyński was forced to explain to Strang that Poland was a backward country with hardly any arms industry of its own, and the Poles needed £24 million to build an electronic grid to bring electricity to the areas of Poland that currently lacked any electricity. Raczyński argued that in this way by bringing electricity to all of Poland would lay the foundations of an arms industry, and thereby rid Poland of the irksome need to import arms from abroad. Raczyński further noted that the areas of Poland that currently had electricity and were industrialised, such as Upper Silesia, were inconveniently on the border with Germany, while many of the areas in the interior of Poland away from Germany tended not to have electricity. In addition, Raczyński stated that Poland would need at least £18 million to buy weapons from abroad as the current lack of an arms industry forced Poland to import almost all of its weapons and another £24 million to import strategic materials that Poland lacked, such as oil. Much to the disappointment of the Poles, the British were only willing to grant a loan made conditional upon the Poles buying only British materials and products, as opposed to the Polish wish to use a British loan to import materials and weapons from wherever they wanted to buy them. After much hard bargaining, the Treasury made an offer to lend Poland £7.5 million on 28 June 1939 in exchange for a promise to devalue the zloty and limit Polish exports of coal from Upper Silesia, which was competing with British coal. On 1 July 1939, the British made a revised offer to provide the Poles with £8 million in credit guarantees for the Polish Army, along with 100 Fairey Battle light bombers and 14 Hawker Hurricane fighters together with £2 million for the electrification of Poland and 1.5 million pounds in cash for the purchase of key supplies. In exchange, Poland was to limit its exports of coal, agree to the devaluation of the zloty, and agree to accept British financial supervision of how it spent the loan, a demand that was considered to be especially crass and insulting in Warsaw. These terms were considered so humiliating that the Poles rejected the offer of the British loan. In August 1939, Raczyński met with Lord Beaverbrook to ask him to stop his attacks on Poland in his newspapers. Raczyński thought the meeting went well enough as Beaverbrook seemed understanding, but the next day found himself the object of an attack in a front-page leader (editorial) in the Evening Standard that accused him of being an "errant ambassador" who was seeking to muzzle the freedom of the press. Adding insult to the injury was the fact that Beaverbrook had written the leader himself as he sought to portray Raczyński's lobbying as censorship.

As the Danzig crisis reached its climax in August 1939, Raczyński remained resolute and self-confident, believing the crisis would be settled peacefully. Raczyński was calm at the news of the Molotov–Ribbentrop Pact, telling Halifax it seemed to be only a "truce", and that if Britain remained firm, Germany would not invade Poland. On behalf of Poland, he signed the Polish-British alliance (25 August 1939), which ultimately led the United Kingdom to declare war on Nazi Germany after the country's invasion. On 26 August 1939, Raczyński was consulted along with Corbin and Tilea about the British reply to Hitler's offer to "guarantee" the existence of the British Empire in exchange for renouncing the alliance with Poland. At about 10:30 am on 1 September 1939, Raczyński phoned Halifax that say Germany had invaded Poland earlier that morning and the cities of Grodno, Brest-Litovsk, Łódź, Wilno (modern Vilnius), Katowice, Kraków and Warsaw had all been bombed. He added that the raid on Warsaw had been especially destructive, killing hundreds of women and children. Raczyński stated it was time to invoke the "guarantee" of Poland along with the Anglo-Polish alliance. During the next two days, Raczyński maintained his aristocratic sang-froid and told Hugh Dalton, the Labour shadow foreign secretary, that he expected Britain to honour its commitments to Poland. In private, Raczyński was deeply troubled by the reports of the destruction wrought in Poland, along with a seeming unwillingness on the part of Britain to declare war. In Paris, the Polish ambassador, Juliusz Łukasiewicz, had stormed into the Quai d'Orsay on the morning of 2 September to demand why France had not declared war yet, and had by all accounts a stormy interview with Bonnet on the subject. Bonnet had told Łukasiewicz that Benito Mussolini had proposed a peace conference to end the war, and France could not declare war yet because of a British "initiative". Immediately after the interview, Łukasiewicz had phoned Raczyński to ask about this British diplomatic "initiative" that Bonnet had referred to. Raczyński told him that he knew of no such "initiative", which led Łukasiewicz to the conclusion that Bonnet had lied to him. On the afternoon of 2 September, Raczyński handed over to the Foreign Office a note saying that the Luftwaffe was mercilessly bombing Polish cities, killing hundreds of innocent people in every raid, and it was imperative that Britain declare war. On the evening of 2 September, Raczyński arrived at the Foreign Office to see Halifax. He stated he learned from Corbin that the major reason for the delay was the desire to present the Anglo-French ultimata to Germany together, leading him to ask if Britain would declare war without the French. Raczyński expressed much mistrust of Bonnet, believing he was using the Italian offer of a peace conference as an excuse not to go to war, saying that he thought that Britain should declare war even if the French had not agreed in advance.

At about 2 am on the night of 2 September, Raczyński was woken up by a phone call from Dalton, who told him that Britain was going to submit an ultimatum to Germany on the morning of 3 September and failing its acceptance, Britain would be at war. Dalton added that he did not expect Germany to accept the ultimatum and was certain that Britain would be at war tomorrow, telling Raczyński "Today both we and France shall be on your side. I hope this news will help you get a little sleep tonight". Raczyński replied "yes, it's true, it makes me feel a little less unhappy". At 12:00 pm on 3 September 1939, there began the first sitting of the House of Commons on a Sunday since 1820. Chamberlain had called a special emergency session that Sunday to announce that Britain was now at war, though many felt that the session was anticlimactic as King George VI had already gone on the radio at 11:00 am to announce the declaration of war. Sitting in the visitor's gallery of the House of Commons were the various ambassadors. Sitting next to Raczyński in a sign of support was the French ambassador Charles Corbin. The Conservative MP Beverley Baxter noted that Raczyński looked exhausted as it appeared that he had not slept for the last two days. Sitting close to Corbin and Raczyński was the pro-appeasement American ambassador Joseph P. Kennedy Sr. who was clearly distraught and upset about Britain going to war. Kennedy brought two of his sons, Joseph P. Kennedy Jr. and John F. Kennedy, both of whom were in better spirits than their father as they chatted with various ambassadors. Chamberlain announced that at about 8 am that morning, the British ambassador to Germany, Sir Nevile Henderson, had submitted an ultimatum demanding that Germany cease its war against Poland immediately and pull back its forces into the Reich, which had been rejected, and as such, Britain was now at war.

=== World War II ===
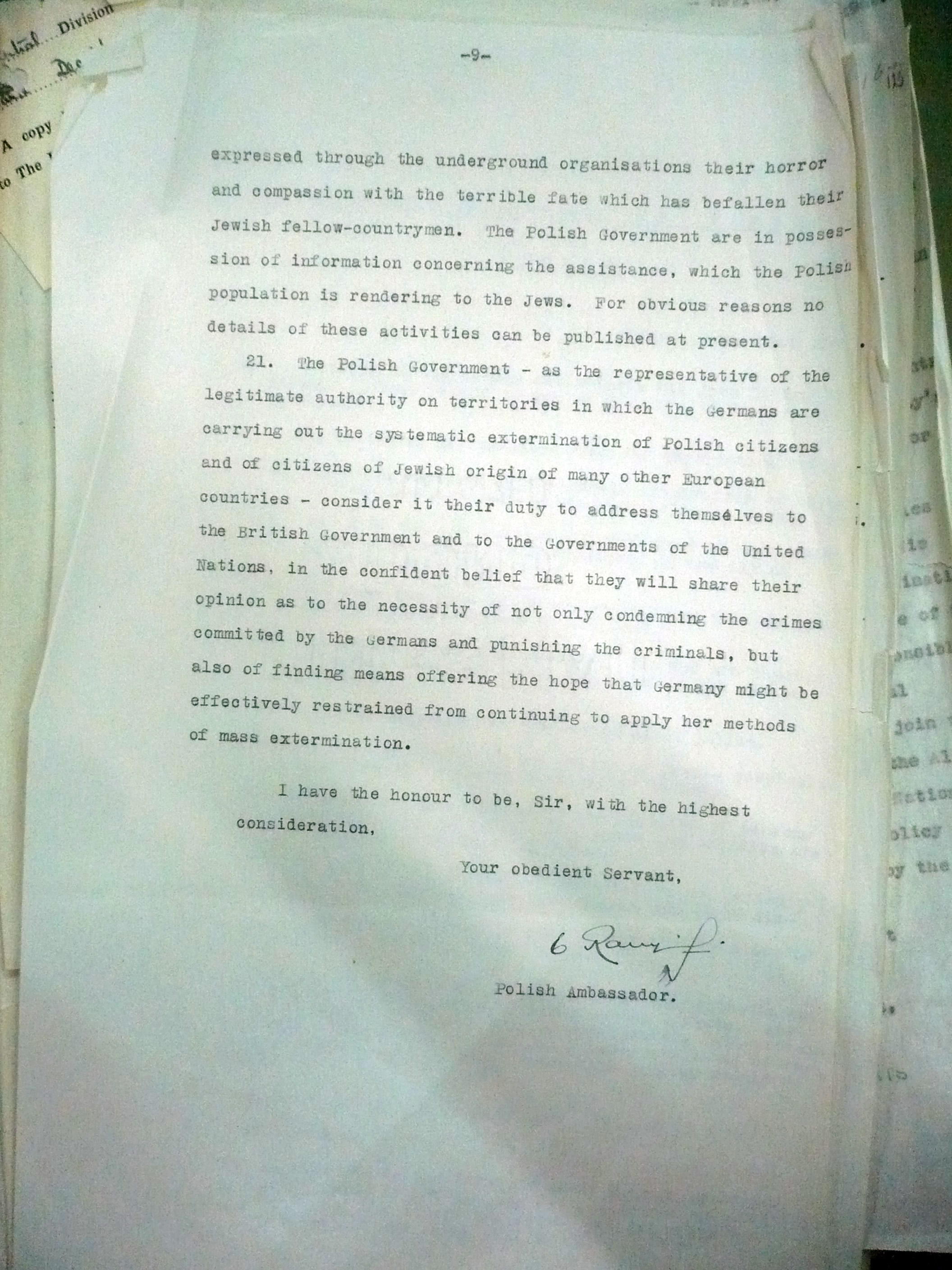
Last page "Raczyński's Note" – official note of Polish government-in-exile to Anthony Eden, 10 December 1942.

Following the 1 September 1939 German Invasion of Poland, Raczyński remained in London, where he continued to serve as the ambassador of the Polish government-in-exile and one of its prominent members. On 18 September 1939, Colonel Beck sent out a message to all Polish ambassadors around the world stating the Polish government had decided to leave Poland along with as many of the Polish Army as possible via Romania with the intention of going to France to continue the war. In response, Germany issued a threat stating that it regarded the droit de passage of the Polish government across Romania as a violation of Romanian neutrality and threatened to invade Romania. Raczyński lobbied Lord Halifax to pressure King Carol II to assure the Poles the droit de passage, saying the continual existence of a Polish government in exile was crucial to the survival of his country. To provide the Romanians with a face-saving excuse, Raczyński devised a plan under which the President Ignacy Mościcki would resign in Romania and name as his successor a Pole living in France while allowing the rest of the Polish government-in-exile to go to Paris.

On 17 September 1939, the Soviet Union invaded Poland in accordance with the secret protocols of the Molotov–Ribbentrop pact. Raczyński submitted a protest to Lord Halifax, who reminded him of a secret protocol in the Anglo-Polish alliance of 25 August 1939, which stated that the alliance only applied to an attack on Poland by Germany and as such Britain had no obligation to declare war on the Soviet Union. On 24 September 1939, an article by the former prime minister David Lloyd George appeared in the Beaverbrook-owned Sunday Express which stated the Soviet Union was entitled to annex most of eastern Poland under the grounds that the majority of people who lived were Belarusians, Ukrainians and Jews with Poles only being a minority. Knowing that there was no hope of being allowed to publish a rebuttal in a Beaverbrook paper, Raczyński wrote a lengthy letter to The Times arguing for the Polish claim to the areas just annexed to the Soviet Union, which the Times refused to publish. Raczyński published at his own expense his letter in the form of a pamphlet to be handed out for free on the streets of London, and which he mailed off to 300 prominent people. On 26 October 1939, in a speech to the House of Lords referring to the Lloyd George-Raczyński dispute, Lord Halifax stated: "It is perhaps a matter of historical interest, worth recalling, that the action of the Soviet government has been to advance the boundary to what was substantially the boundary recommended at the time of the Versailles conference by the noble Marquess who used to lead this house, Lord Curzon, who was then Foreign Secretary". Halifax's thinly veiled endorsement of the Curzon line as the Polish-Soviet frontier led to another protest from Raczyński. Lord Halifax was known to have strong anti-Soviet feelings as the devoutly religious Halifax felt uncomfortable with an atheist state. Raczyński learned that the refusal to declare war on the Soviet Union was simply an act of realpolitik as Britain would take on both Germany and the Soviet Union at the same time, and there was still hope that the Molotov–Ribbentrop pact might be temporary.

When the Polish government-in-exile arrived in London in 1940, Raczyński's importance vastly increased as he was one of the few Polish officials fluent in English and as the long-time Polish ambassador to the court of St. James was the Polish official best known to British officials. The German historian Julia Eichenberg described wartime London as "a sort of capital for free Europe" as London hosted the governments-in-exile for Poland, Norway, the Netherlands, Belgium, Luxembourg, Czechoslovakia, Yugoslavia and Greece along with the French National Committee that represented Free France. During the war, Raczyński often negotiated with Edvard Beneš, the president of the Czechoslovak government-in-exile, along with Hubert Ripka and Jaromír Smutný about the future relations between Poland and Czechoslovakia. Another leader with whom Raczyński was in frequent contact was Paul-Henri Spaak, the foreign minister of the Belgian government-in-exile and an advocate of a federation to be called the United States of Europe to be created after the war. Significantly, Raczyński later entitled his 1962 memoirs In Allied London, which reflected the fact that he negotiated just as much with the other governments-in-exile as he did with the British government. Raczyński wrote in 1943 about the streets of wartime London that he was struck by the sheer diversity of people he encountered, as there were people from all over the world in London, leading him to write: "The streets are full of foreign uniforms, especially Polish ones distinguished by the shoulder badge and four-cornered cap. Lately, I have seen a good many French, who, like the Poles, are easily distinguished by their headgear. A large portion of the British of both sexes are in uniform, which is a novelty as far as the women are concerned".

Between 22 July 1941 and 14 July 1943, he was also the Polish Minister of Foreign Affairs in the cabinet of Władysław Sikorski. In this capacity, he provided the Allies with one of the earliest and most accurate accounts of the ongoing Holocaust ("The Mass Extermination of Jews in German Occupied Poland", Raczyński's Note addressed to the Governments of the United Nations on 10 December 1942") and pleaded for action. Along with Sikorski, Raczyński was deeply involved in talks in June 1942 with the Soviet ambassador to Britain, Ivan Maisky, along with the visiting Soviet foreign commissar Vyacheslav Molotov for the release of the Poles imprisoned in Soviet camps. The British foreign secretary Anthony Eden and the permanent undersecretary Alexander Cadogan served as mediators during the tense Polish-Soviet talks, which came close to breaking down several times. Reflecting their personalities, Molotov played the "hard man" role who lived up to his nickname of "Mr Nyet" while the genial and easy-going Maisky played the more accommodating role. The talks ended with the Soviets agreeing to release a number of the imprisoned Poles, most notably the surviving Polish servicemen taken prisoner by the Red Army in 1939 who left the Soviet Union to form the 2nd Polish Corps under the command of General Władysław Anders. However, Sikorski and Raczyński were unable to secure a promise that the Soviet Union would return the areas of Poland annexed in 1939 under the Molotov–Ribbentrop pact, with Molotov saying that the frontiers established in 1939 would be the post-war Polish-Soviet border.

Raczyński noted that relations between Winston Churchill and Charles de Gaulle were frequently stormy and tempestuous as the two men did not get along very well, but that Churchill had to tolerate de Gaulle because he was the only non-Communist French leader at large who was not a collaborator and because the British needed a strong France after the war to serve as a bulwark against the Soviet Union. Raczyński wrote: "De Gaulle could afford to irritate British statesmen and tell them unpleasant truths to their faces. They might not like it, but they could not afford to abandon him or France. However, they could and did treat the Polish cause and that of the whole of Eastern Europe as something secondary, not a vital interest of their own, but as a debt of honour to be discharged, if possible without excessive effort or risk".

In July 1944, Raczyński told the British Foreign Secretary Anthony Eden that Warsaw was on the brink of a rebellion and stated that the Polish government-in-exile would soon start "Operation Tempest", a plan for the AK (Armia Krajowa–Home Army) to rise up to seize Warsaw, as it was reported that German forces were pulling out of Warsaw. Raczyński also asked that the BBC's German language service should broadcast a message asking for the Germans to treat the AK as legitimate soldiers entitled to being treated as prisoners of war and not summarily execute captured members of the AK as they usually did as the Germans insist that the AK were guerrillas who were operating outside of the laws of war.

=== Later life ===
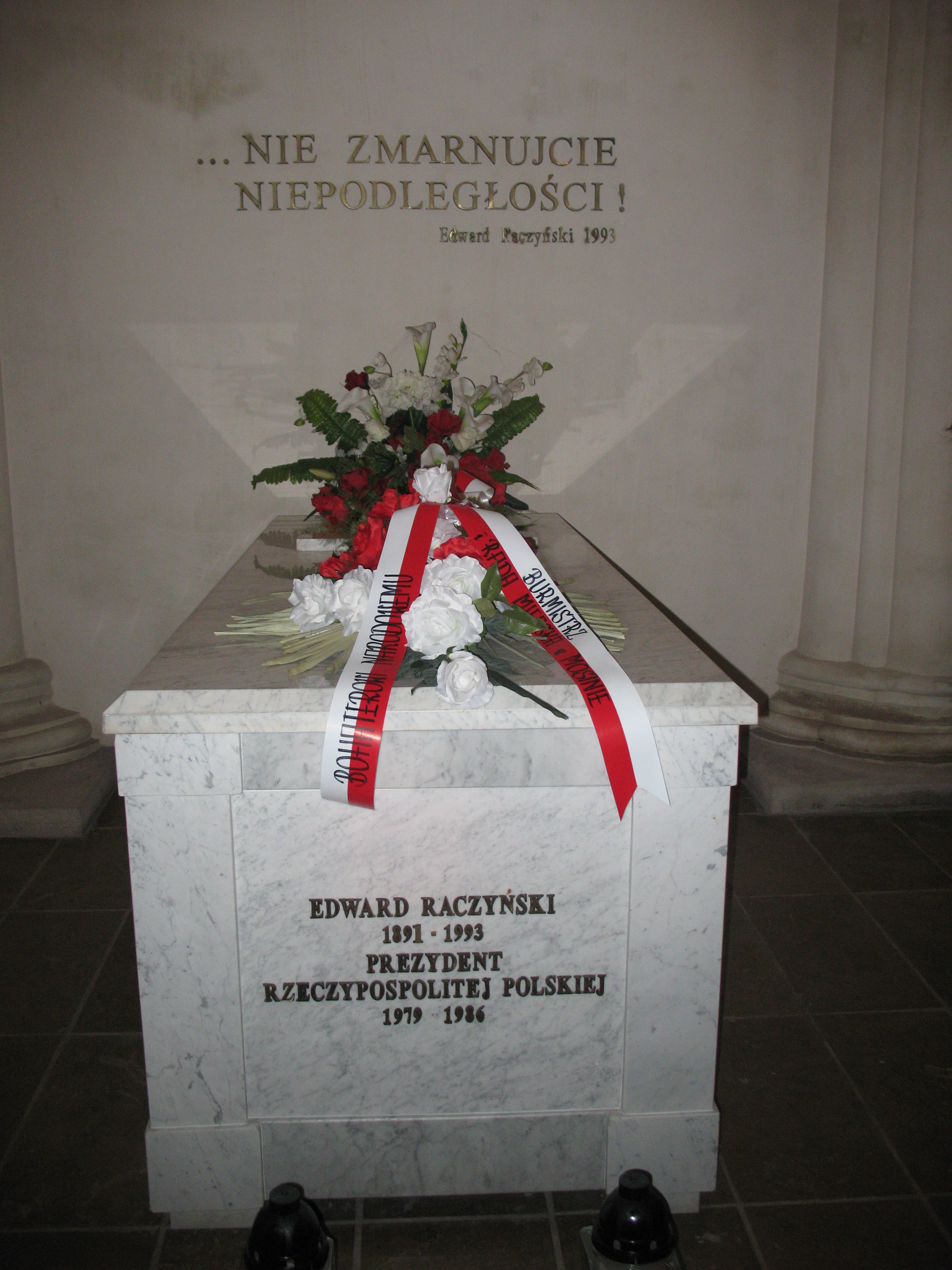
Sarcophagus of President Edward Raczyński in Rogalin

After 1945, when the government of the United Kingdom broke the pacts with Poland and withdrew support for the Polish government, Raczyński remained in London, where he acted as one of the most notable members of the Polish diaspora there. He was active in various political and social organisations in exile, including the Fundusz Pomocy Krajowi (Help for the Country Fund), which actively supported the democratic opposition in communist-controlled Poland. Between 1954 and 1972, he was one of the members of the Council of the Three, the collective presidential body of the Polish government-in-exile. He was also a member of the Committee for Polish Affairs and an advisor to various British governmental agencies and ministries.

In March 1979, Raczyński became president in exile, after being previously chosen by the outgoing President Stanisław Ostrowski. In turn, he chose as his successor Prime Minister Kazimierz Sabbat.

During the Raczyński presidency (1979–1986), the Solidarity movement was established in Poland. Raczyński played an important role in raising awareness about the events in Poland in Western countries and in establishing closer ties with the opposition movement in Poland.

President Raczyński at some point considered naming Władysław Bartoszewski as his successor, as he wanted to choose someone "from the country" and with strong ties to the Polish opposition movement. Bartoszewski, however, declined the offer.

After serving a 7-year term, he resigned from his post on 8 April 1986. He was the last Polish President-in-Exile who had held an important office during the era of the 2nd Republic: his successors, Kazimierz Sabbat and Ryszard Kaczorowski, were in their twenties at the outset of the Second World War. As he left office, he received praise for reuniting the Polish political emigration and reshaping the Government-in-exile.

=== Death and legacy ===
Raczyński died on 30 July 1993 at his home in London, the last male descendant of his line. His coffin was placed in the mausoleum of his family located at the chapel in Rogalin. In his last will and testament, Count Raczyński bequeathed his family's palace in Rogalin and his library to the Polish nation. He was the longest living head of state in Poland's history and one of the very few centenarians among European politicians of the 20th century.

In 2004, a blue plaque was installed on the house where he lived and died, No. 8 Lennox Gardens in Brompton.

Political offices
| Preceded by Stanisław Ostrowski | President of the Polish Republic-in-exile; 1979–1986 | Succeeded by Kazimierz Sabbat |

== Honours ==
- Order of the White Eagle (Poland)
- Grand Cross of the Order of Polonia Restituta (Poland)
- Honorary Knight Grand Cross of the Order of the British Empire (GBE)
- Grand Cross of the Order of Pius IX from the Pope
- Doctor Honoris Causa of the Polish University Abroad, London, in 1982; Jagellonian University in 1992
- Honorary citizen of the cities of Kraków and Poznań

== Family ==
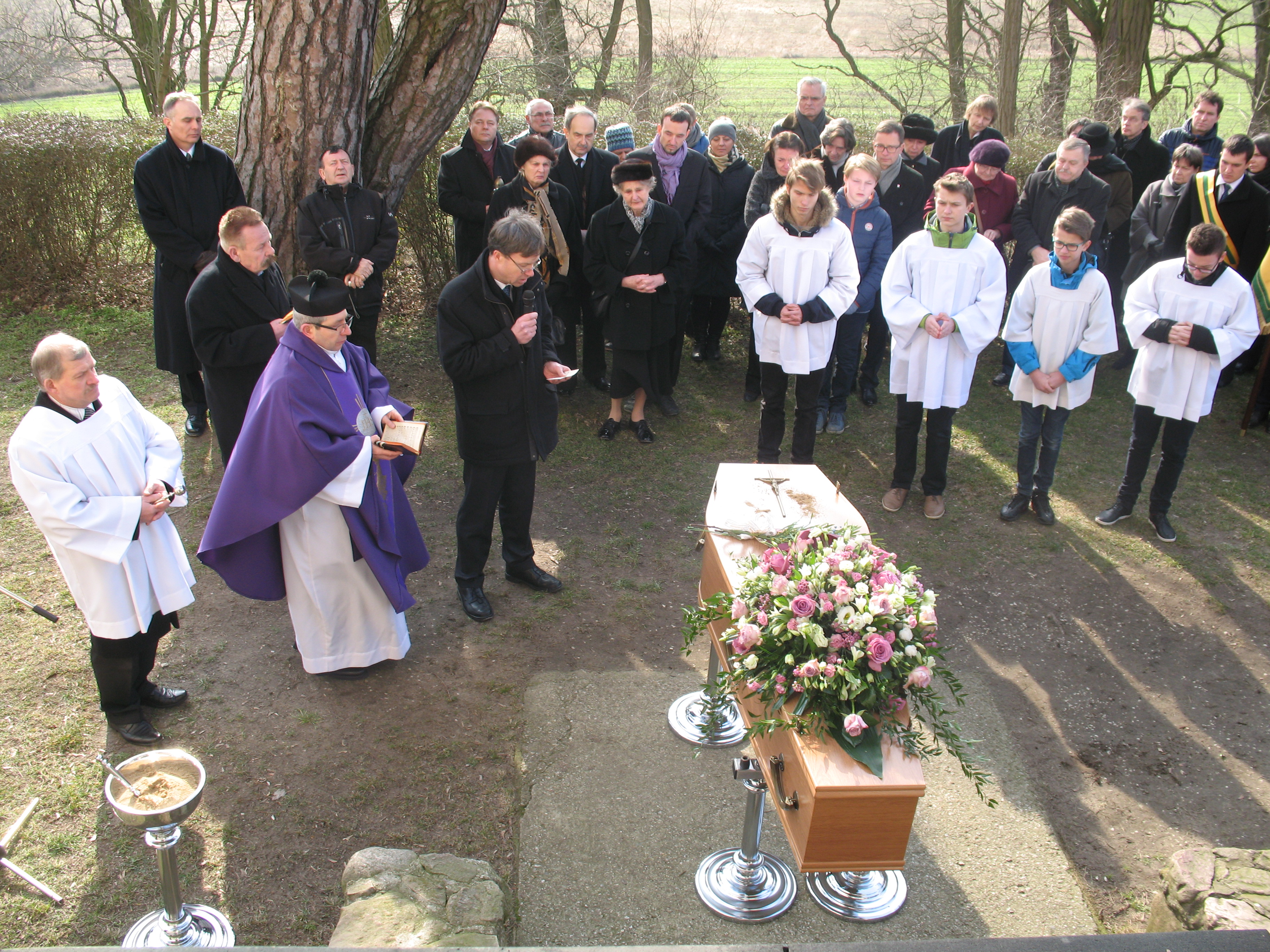
Funeral of Wanda Dembińska (née Raczyńska) in Rogalin on 27 February 2016

In 1925, Edward Raczyński married Joyous Markham, daughter of a British coal mining mogul, Sir Arthur Markham, 1st Baronet, but she died in 1931.

On 25 August 1932, he married his second wife, Cecylia Maria Jaroszyńska, by whom he had three daughters:

- Wanda Dembińska née Raczyńska (1933–2016), wife of Capt. Ryszard Dembiński (1924–2008), who was chairman of the Polish Institute and Sikorski Museum in 1979–2003;
- Viridianna Rey, née Raczyńska (b. 1935), wife of Count Xawery Rey (1934–1987);
- Katarzyna Raczyńska (b. 1939).

In 1962, his second wife, Cecylia, died.

In 1991, at the age of 99, Edward Raczyński married his third wife, Aniela Lilpop (daughter of architect, Franciszek Lilpop), thus legalising a union of many years.

== Bibliography ==
Raczyński's Works

- Edward Raczyński, The British-Polish Alliance, Its Origin and Meaning; London 1948.
- Edward Raczyński, W sojuszniczym Londynie. Dziennik ambasadora Edwarda Raczyńskiego 1939–1945; London 1960. ISBN 0-85065-287-1.
- Edward Raczynski, "In Allied London. The Wartime diaries of the Polish Ambassador", London, Weidenfeld and Nicolson, 1962.
- Omar Khayyám, Rubayat. Polish translation by Edward Raczyński, London, 1960.
- Edward Raczyński, Rogalin i jego mieszkańcy. London, 1969. ISBN 83-919577-0-5.
- Edward Raczyński, Pani Róża (a Biography of his mother), London 1969. ISBN 83-901583-2-9.
- Edward Raczyński, Od Narcyza Kulikowskiego do Winstona Churchilla. London 1976.
- Edward Raczynski (with Tadeusz Zenczykowski), "Od Genewy do Jalty. Rozmowy radiowe", London, Puls, 1988.
- Edward Raczyński, Czas wielkich zmian. Paris 1990. ISBN 2-85316-064-5.

Family History

- Simon Konarski, Armorial de la Noblesse Polonaise titrée, Paris 1958.

Raczyński's Biography

- Krzysztof Kania, Edward Bernard Raczynski, 1891–1993, Dyplomata i Polityk, Wydawnictwo Neriton, Warsaw, 2014.

== See also ==
- History of Poland
- Polish Government in Exile

== Books ==
- Adams, Robert (1993). British Politics and Foreign Policy in the Age of Appeasement, 1935–1939. London: Palgrave Macmillan. ISBN 9780230375635.
- Charman, Terry (2010). The Day We Went to War. London: Ebury Publishing. ISBN 9780753537787.
- Coutouvidis, John (October 1984). "Government-in-Exile: The Transfer of Polish Authority Abroad in September 1939". Review of International Studies. 10 (4): 285–296. doi:10.1017/S0260210500116316.
- Eichenberg, Julia (2023). "Taming the Polyp: Address Books and Their Impact on Wartime Exile in London". In Burcu Dogramaci; Ekaterina Aygün; Mareike Hetschold; Laura Karp Lugo; Rachel Lee; Helene Roth (eds.). Urban Exile: Theories, Methods, Research Practices. Bristol: Intellect. pp. 32–44.
- Kochanski, Halik (2012). The Eagle Unbowed Poland and the Poles in the Second World War. Cambridge: Harvard University Press. ISBN 9780674068162.
- McGilvray, Evan (2015). Days of Adversity The Warsaw Uprising 1944. Warwick: Helion. ISBN 9781912174348.
- Olson, Lynn (2010). Citizens of London The Americans Who Stood with Britain in Its Darkest, Finest Hour. New York: Random House. ISBN 9780812979350.
- Praźmowska, Anita (1987). Britain, Poland and the Eastern Front, 1939. Cambridge: Cambridge University Press.
- Praźmowska, Anita (2011). "Poland, the "Danzig Question", and the Outbreak of the Second World War". In Frank McDonough (ed.). The Origins of the Second World War: An International Perspective. London: Continuum. pp. 394–408.
- Puchalski, Piotr (2021). Poland in a Colonial World Order Adjustments and Aspirations, 1918–1939. London: Taylor & Francis. ISBN 9781000479966.
- Rzeshevsky, Oleg A. (1996). War and Diplomacy The Making of the Grand Alliance. London: Taylor & Francis. ISBN 9781134370818.
- Trinder, Donald (August 2021). "The portrait of a nation: Poland through the eyes of the British press September 1938–August 1939". Repozytorium Uniwersytetu Rzeszowskiego: 1–9.
- Watt, D.C. (1989). How War Came The Immediate Origins of the Second World War, 1938–1939. London: Heinmann.
- Webster, Wendy (2018). Mixing It Diversity in World War Two Britain. Oxford: Oxford University Press. ISBN 9780191054600.
