= Mieczysław Rakowski =

Polish politician (1926–2008)

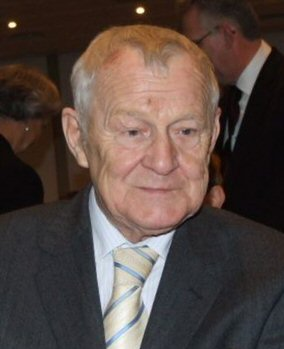
- Rakowski in 2007

7th First Secretary of the Polish United Workers' Party
- In office 29 July 1989 – 29 January 1990
- President: Wojciech Jaruzelski
- Prime Minister: Czesław Kiszczak; Tadeusz Mazowiecki
- Preceded by: Wojciech Jaruzelski
- Succeeded by: Aleksander Kwaśniewski (As Leader of Social Democracy)

Prime Minister of Poland
- In office 27 September 1988 – 2 August 1989 Serving with Edward Szczepanik (in-exile)
- President: Wojciech Jaruzelski (July–August 1989)
- Chairman: Wojciech Jaruzelski (September 1988–July 1989)
- Preceded by: Zbigniew Messner
- Succeeded by: Czesław Kiszczak

Deputy Prime Minister
- In office 12 February 1981 – 12 November 1985
- President: Henryk Jabłoński

Personal details
- Born: 1 December 1926 Kowalewko, Poznań Voivodeship, Poland
- Died: 8 November 2008 (aged 81) Warsaw, Poland
- Party: Polish United Workers' Party
- Spouse(s): Wanda Wiłkomirska (1952–1977); Elżbieta Kępińska (1986–2008)
- Occupation: Historian, Journalist

Mieczysław Franciszek Rakowski (Note: Polish pronunciation: [mʲeˈt͡ʂɨswaf raˈkɔfskʲi]) (1 December 1926 – 8 November 2008) was a Polish communist politician, historian and journalist who was Prime Minister of Poland from 1988 to 1989. He served as the seventh and final First Secretary of the Polish United Workers' Party from 1989 to 1990.

== Early life and career ==
Rakowski was born in a peasant family and operated a lathe as a teenager. He served as an officer in the Polish People's Army from 1945 to 1949. He began his political career in 1946 as a member of the Polish Workers' Party, and from 1948 to 1990 he was a member of the communist Polish United Workers' Party (PZPR), serving on its Central Committee from 1975 to 1990. From 1972 to 1989, he served continuously as a member of the Sejm of the Polish People's Republic. In the 9th term of the Sejm, he served as Deputy Speaker until 17 June 1988.

He received a doctorate in history from Warsaw's Institute for Social Sciences in 1956. Rakowski was also known as one of the founders and, from 1958 to 1982, first deputy and then chief editor of the weekly newspaper Polityka, one of the most influential publications at the time (Polityka continues to exist and is regarded by many as a prestigious weekly in Poland). Today some people still remember him as a journalist and editor rather than a politician.

== Leadership of the PZPR ==
Rakowski served as the second-to-last communist Prime Minister of Poland from September 1988 to August 1989 (Czesław Kiszczak then served less than a month as the last Communist to hold the post, before the accession of Tadeusz Mazowiecki). He was the last First Secretary of the PZPR from July 1989 to January 1990. However, he was not, unlike his predecessors, the de facto leader of the country; the PZPR had given up its monopoly on power in early 1989.

Rakowski was involved in the Communist government during the suppression of the Solidarity movement. He also played a part in the Polish transformation from state socialism to market capitalism, as his Communist-led government was forced to reform and he was one of the key players in the Polish Round Table Agreements.

== Later life and death ==
Since then, Rakowski withdrew from active political life, but participated in public debates – he was the editor-in-chief of the magazine "Today", wrote for "Trybuna", published diaries (10 volumes covering the years 1958–1989), as well as a diary from 1991–2006 (Polski Składniec). From 2003 to 2004, he hosted his own talk show on TVP3, to which he invited well-known figures from the communist era.

He was a member of Włodzimierz Cimoszewicz's electoral committee in the 2005 presidential elections.

He was a lecturer at the University of Humanities and Economics in Łódź. He died on 8 November 2008 from cancer in Warsaw at the age of 81. He was buried at the Powązki Military Cemetery in Warsaw.

== Private life ==
Prior to becoming prime minister, he had been divorced from the violinist Wanda Wiłkomirska, with whom he had two sons. In 1986, he married actress Elżbieta Kępińska. He remained with her until his death in 2008. He was fluent in Russian, German and English, alongside Polish.

== Awards and decorations ==
- Grand Cross of Order of Polonia Restituta (1997)
- Order of the Banner of Labour, 1st Class
- Commander's Cross with Star of Order of Polonia Restituta
- Order of the Banner of Labour, 2nd Class
- Golden Cross of Merit
- Medal of the 40th Anniversary of People's Poland
- Medal of the 10th Anniversary of People's Poland
- Medal of Ludwik Waryński

== Notes ==
Political offices
Preceded by Zbigniew Messner	Prime Minister of Poland; 1988 – 1989	Succeeded by Czesław Kiszczak
Party political offices
Preceded by Wojciech Jaruzelski	First Secretary of the Polish United Workers' Party; 1989 – 1990	Party dissolved
