= Roczyny =

- Village
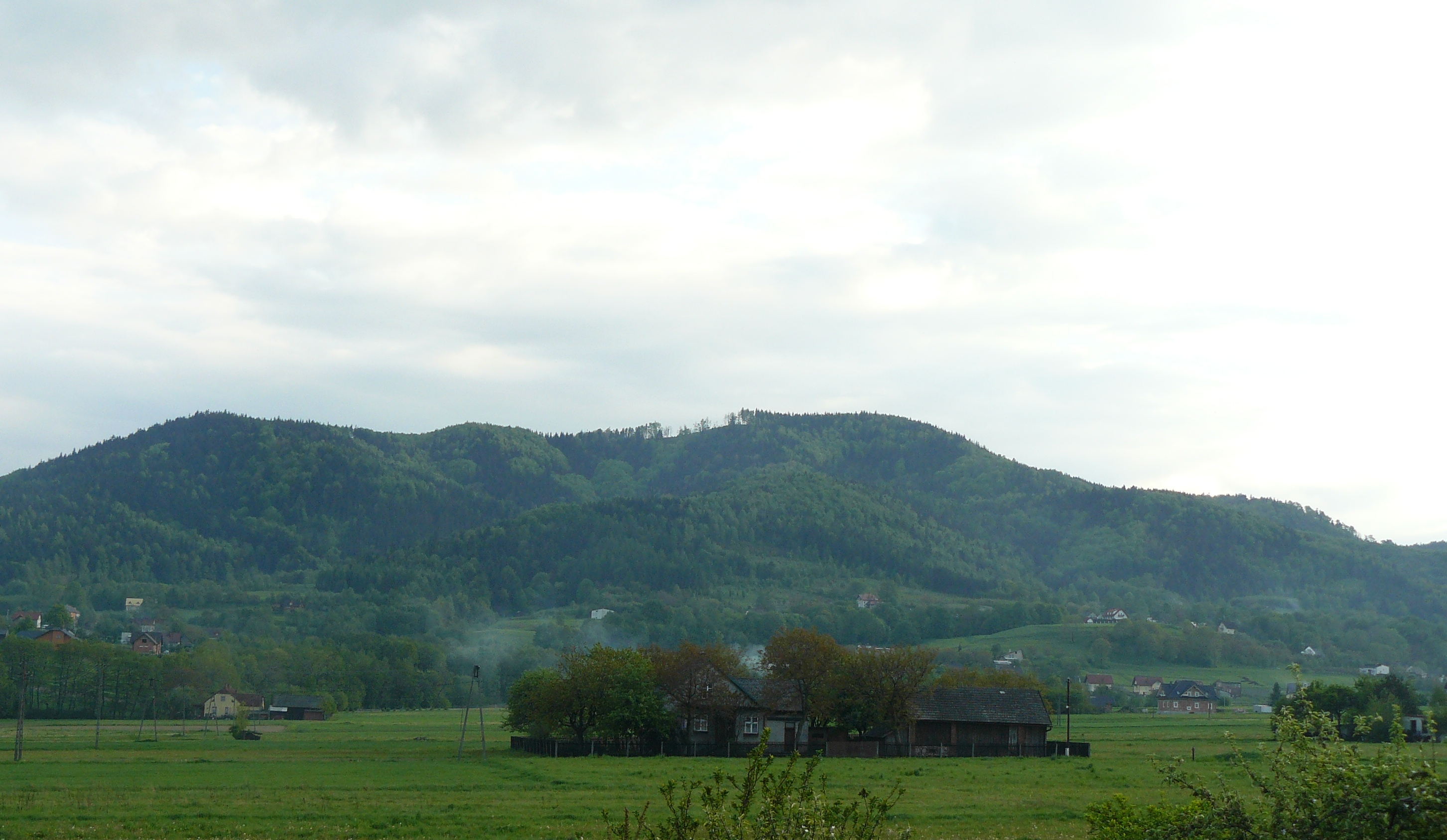
- Roczyny under Złota Górka mountain in Little Beskids

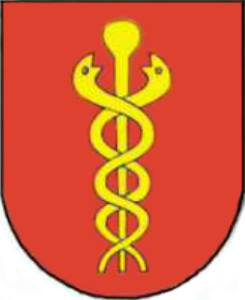
- Coat of arms

- Location within Poland
- Coordinates: 49°51′N 19°19′E
- Country: Poland
- Voivodeship: Lesser Poland
- County: Wadowice
- Gmina: Andrychów
- First mentioned: 1457
- Population: 3,728
- Website: http://www.roczyny.pl/

Roczyny [rɔˈt͡ʂɨnɨ] is a village in the administrative district of Gmina Andrychów, within Wadowice County, Lesser Poland Voivodeship, in southern Poland.

== History ==
The village was first mentioned as Rocziny in the document issued by Jan IV of Oświęcim on 21 February 1457 in which he agreed to sell the Duchy of Oświęcim to the Polish Crown.

The territory of the Duchy of Oświęcim was eventually incorporated into Poland in 1564 and formed Silesian County of Kraków Voivodeship. Upon the First Partition of Poland in 1772 it became part of the Austrian Kingdom of Galicia. After World War I and fall of Austria-Hungary it became part of Poland. It was annexed by Nazi Germany at the beginning of World War II, and afterwards it was restored to Poland.

== Village Coat of Arms ==
The village emblem shows Mercury's staff on a red background, braided with two snakes. The seal of the seal has the inscription Village Roczyny N 48. The golden color of the staff symbolizes the power of power and dignity, while the snakes symbolize fame, war and courage.

== Notable people ==
- Czesław Kiszczak (1925–2015), general
