= Council of Three (Poland) =

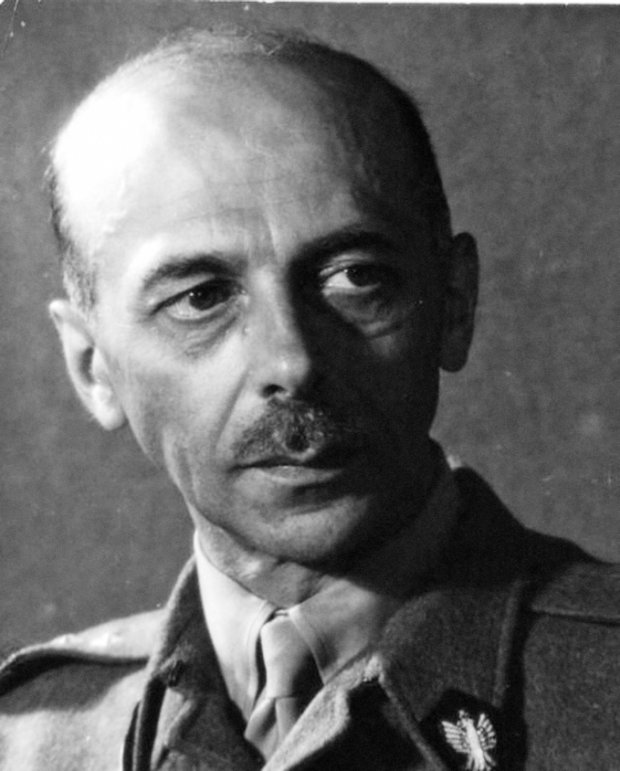
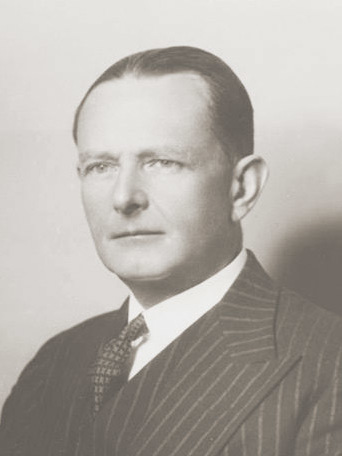
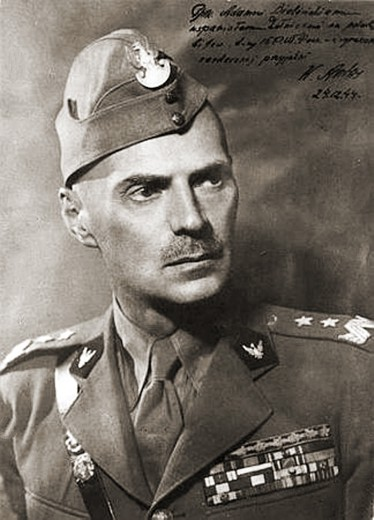
- L-R: Tadeusz Bór-Komorowski, Edward Raczyński, and Władysław Anders, the members of the Council of Three in its longest-existing composition

Presidency of Poland
- Acting, in-exile 9 June 1954 – 18 July 1972 Serving with August Zaleski
- Prime Minister: Roman Odzierzyński; Adam Ciołkosz; Witold Czerwiński; Adam Ciołkosz; Jan Starzewski; Kazimierz Sabbat
- Preceded by: August Zaleski
- Succeeded by: Stanisław Ostrowski

The Council of Three (Polish: Rada Trzech, IPA: [ˈrada ˈtʂɛx]) was a collegial body created by the Polish Government in Exile in 1954 with prerogatives of the President of Poland. It consisted of three members of the government chosen by the Council of National Unity (Rada Jedności Narodowej), a rump parliament in exile.

It was created in 1954, after President August Zaleski declined to leave his office after his seven-year term ended. According to the Polish April 1935 constitution, the legal basis for the existence of the government in exile, the president was allowed to choose his successor "during a war, in case his office falls vacant before the peace treaty is signed". The post-war Akt Zjednoczenia Narodowego (National Unity Act) was an agreement among all the major political parties that assumed that presidents were to choose their successors every seven years, but that was rejected by Zaleski.

Initially, the Rada Trzech was a self-proclaimed committee of opposition to Zaleski, but on 21 July 1956, the Rada Jedności Narodowej granted it the powers of the Polish head of state. It was dissolved in July 1972, following Zaleski's death on 7 April that year. The Rada Trzech ceded its powers to Zaleski's successor, Stanisław Ostrowski.

== Members ==
The members of the Rada Trzech were:

- General Władysław Anders (until 1970)
- Edward Raczyński (until 1972)
- Tomasz Arciszewski (until 1955)

Tomasz Arciszewski died in 1955. His place was taken by:

- General Tadeusz Bór-Komorowski (1956-1966)
- General Roman Odzierzyński (1966-1968)
- Stanisław Mglej (1968-1969)
- Alfred Urbański (1969-1972)

Władysław Anders died in 1970. His place was taken by:

- General Stanisław Kopański (1970-1972)

=== Chairmen of the Executive for National Unity ===
As part of its opposition to August Zaleski's continuation, the Council of Three refused to recognise the governments appointed by him, and appointed its own government, the Executive for National Unity. The Chairmen (Prime Ministers) of this executive were:

- Roman Odzierzyński (1954–1955)
- Adam Ciołkosz (1956–1959)
- Witold Czerwiński (1959–1963)
- Adam Ciołkosz (1963 – December 1966)
- Jan Starzewski (December 1966 – 1967)
- Kazimierz Sabbat (1967 – 8 July 1972)

== Aftermath ==
Following the Council of Three's reintegration with the mainstream Polish government-in-exile, the new president, Stanisław Ostrowski, stepped down after seven years and appointed Edward Bernard Raczyński (the Council's longest serving member) as his successor in 1979.

Another member of the Council of Three, Alfred Urbański, became prime minister immediately after the reintegration, and served for four years; his successor in the premiership of the "mainstream" government-in-exile was Kazimierz Sabbat, the last prime minister appointed by the Council of Three. Sabbat himself later succeeded Raczyński as president in 1986.

== See also ==
- Polish Government in Exile
