= Alfred Urbański =

Polish politician, a member of the Polish Socialist Party (PPS)

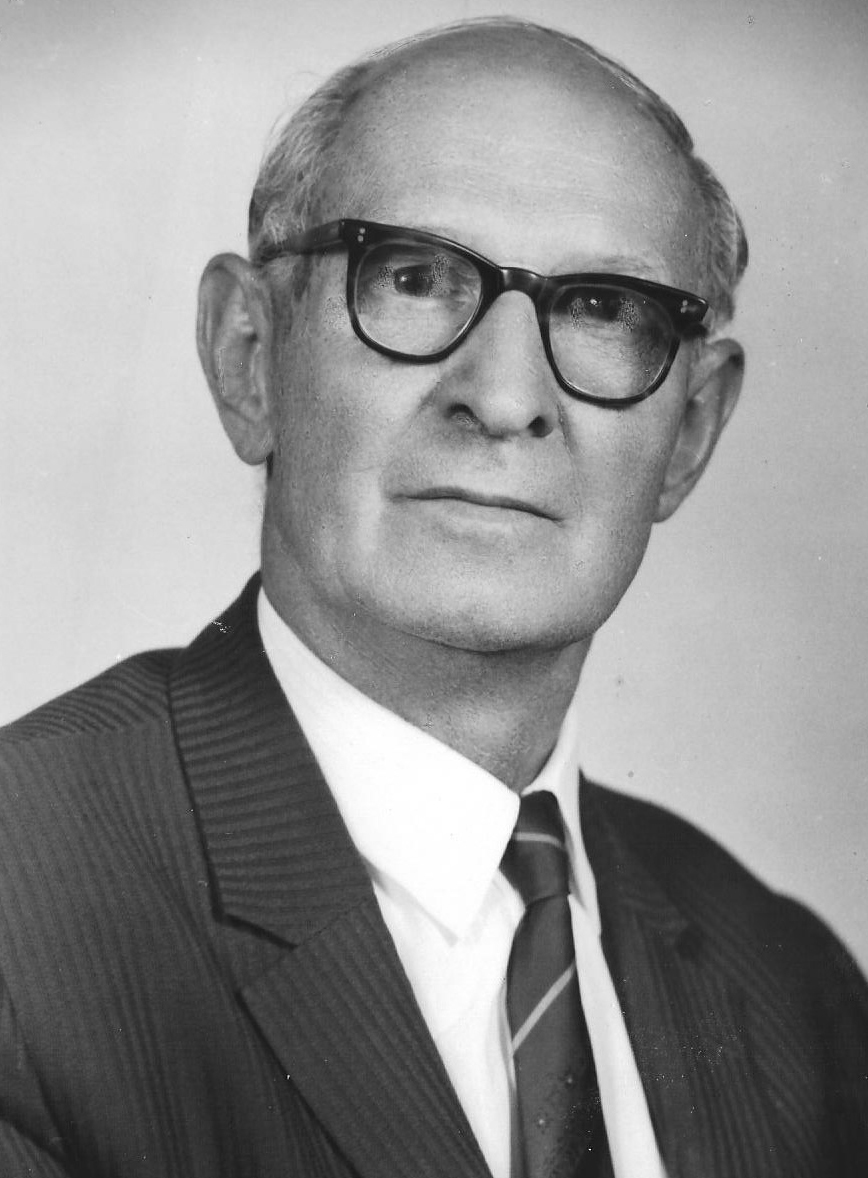
Alfred Urbański Prime Minister of Poland in Exile 1972–1976

Alfred Urbański (13 January 1899 – 10 September 1983) was a Polish politician, a member of the Polish Socialist Party (PPS), primarily known for his political activities within the Polish Government in Exile.

Urbański, an economist, was from 1969 to 1972 a member of the Council of Three (Rada Trzech) – a collective head of state in opposition to the president in exile, August Zaleski.

After Zaleski's death, the Council of Three recognized and supported his successor, President Stanisław Ostrowski. Ostrowski named Urbański to be his 42nd prime minister, a post he held from 18 July 1972 to 15 July 1976.

Urbański had a noble heritage (szlachta).

Political offices
Preceded by Zygmunt Muchniewski	Prime Minister of the Republic of Poland in Exile; 1972–1976	Succeeded by Kazimierz Sabbat
