= Edward Szczepanik =

Prime Minister of Poland (1915–2005)

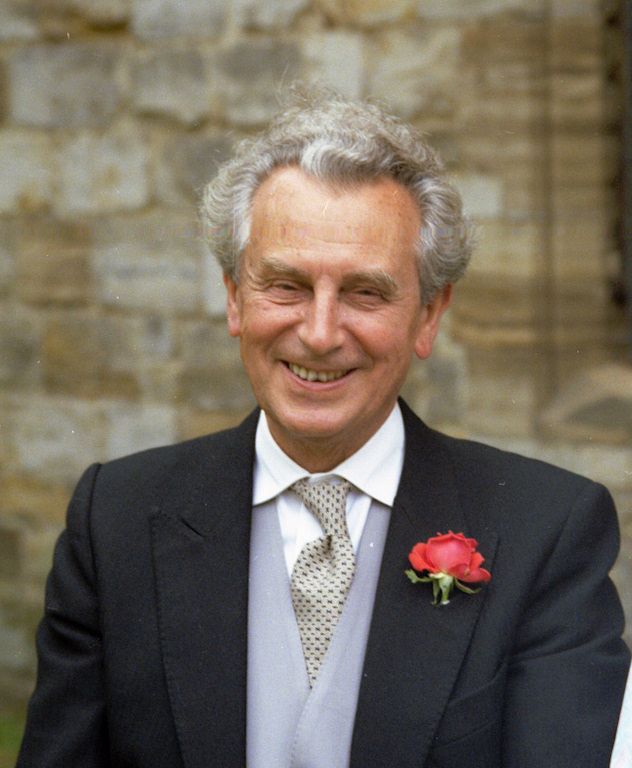
- Szczepanik in 1986.

Prime Minister of Poland
- In exile 8 April 1986 – 22 December 1990
- President: Kazimierz Sabbat; Ryszard Kaczorowski
- Counterparts in country: Zbigniew Messner; Mieczysław Rakowski; Czesław Kiszczak; Tadeusz Mazowiecki
- Preceded by: Kazimierz Sabbat
- Succeeded by: Tadeusz Mazowiecki (Third Polish Republic)

Personal details
- Born: Edward Franciszek Szczepanik; 22 August 1915 Suwałki, Ober Ost (now Poland)
- Died: 11 October 2005 (aged 90) Worcestershire, England
- Education: Warsaw School of Economics

Edward Franciszek Szczepanik (Polish: [ʂt͡ʂɛˈpaɲik]; 22 August 1915 – 11 October 2005) was a Polish economist and the last Prime Minister of the Polish Government in Exile.

== Biography ==
Szczepanik was born on 21 August 1915 (his birth was registered with the birth date of 22 August 1915) in Suwałki, a small town in northern Poland, while Suwałki was part of the Russian Empire under German occupation, administered as part of Ober Ost.

=== Early life ===
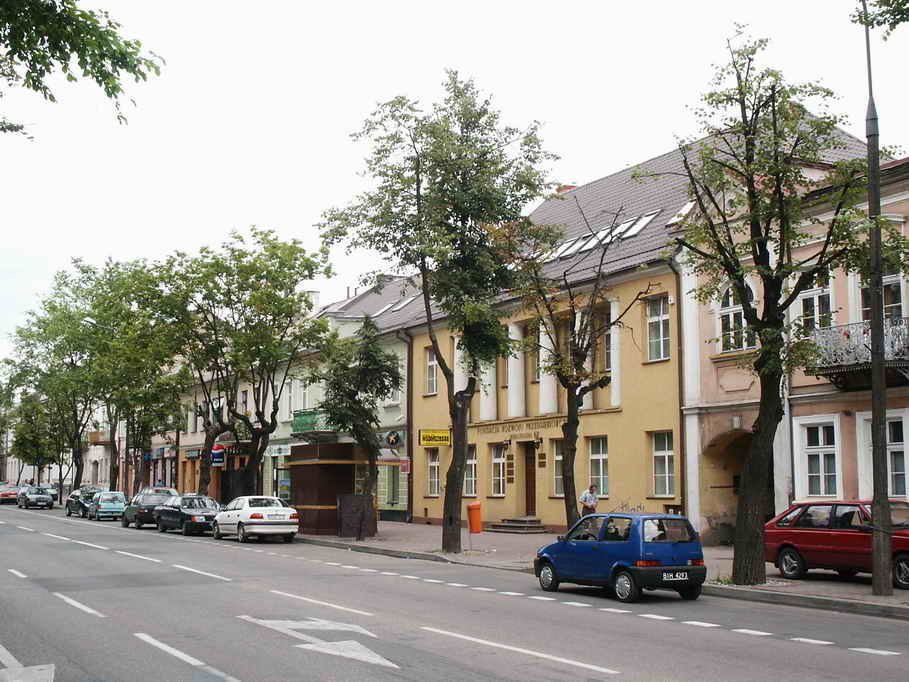
Kościuszko street, Suwałki.

Szczepanik lived in Kościuszko street, he went to the local grammar school and then studied at the Warsaw School of Economics (SGH). He studied for his MSc in political economy under Professor Edward Lipiński in 1936. During his compulsory military service he was stationed at the Artillery Officers' School with the 29th Light Artillery Regiment. He won a scholarship to study at the London School of Economics, studying under Professors Lionel Robbins, Friedrich Hayek and Paul Narcyz Rosenstein-Rodan. On his return he became an assistant in Lipiński's department in SGH. After the interruption of the war, he completed his education with an MSc in economics from the LSE in 1953 and also a PhD in economics in 1956.

=== World War II ===
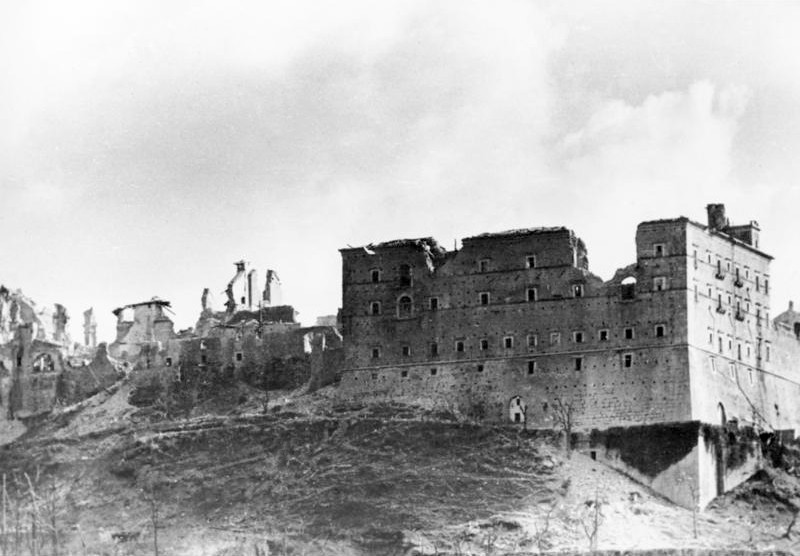
Monte Cassino.

During the Invasion of Poland, Szczepanik was interned in Lithuania and later captured by the Soviet forces. From 1940 until 1942, he was held prisoner in the Soviet Gulag camps in Kozielsk and Kola Peninsula. Following the outbreak of the Russo-German War and the signing of the Sikorski-Mayski Agreement, he was released and joined the Polish II Corps under general Władysław Anders. As an Officer (and eventually Major) in the Polish Army, he served with distinction in the Fifth Polish Artillery Regiment – notably in the battles of Monte Cassino, Ancona, and Bologna. He was one of the first Allied troops to enter Bologna. In 1945 he received the Cross of the Valorous, and the following year was awarded the Silver Cross of Merit with Swords. In addition, Szczepanik was awarded the Italian Cross of Military Merit by the King of Italy and several other Polish and British campaign medals. He also served as a liaison officer with the Royal Artillery Training Team, commanded by Colonel R.R. Hoare.

=== Marriage and children ===
Edward Szczepanik married Hanna Maria Janikowska on 29 June 1946 in Rome. They had four children, Barbara, Tadeusz, Zofia and Tomasz, all of whom were born in London.

=== Economics career ===
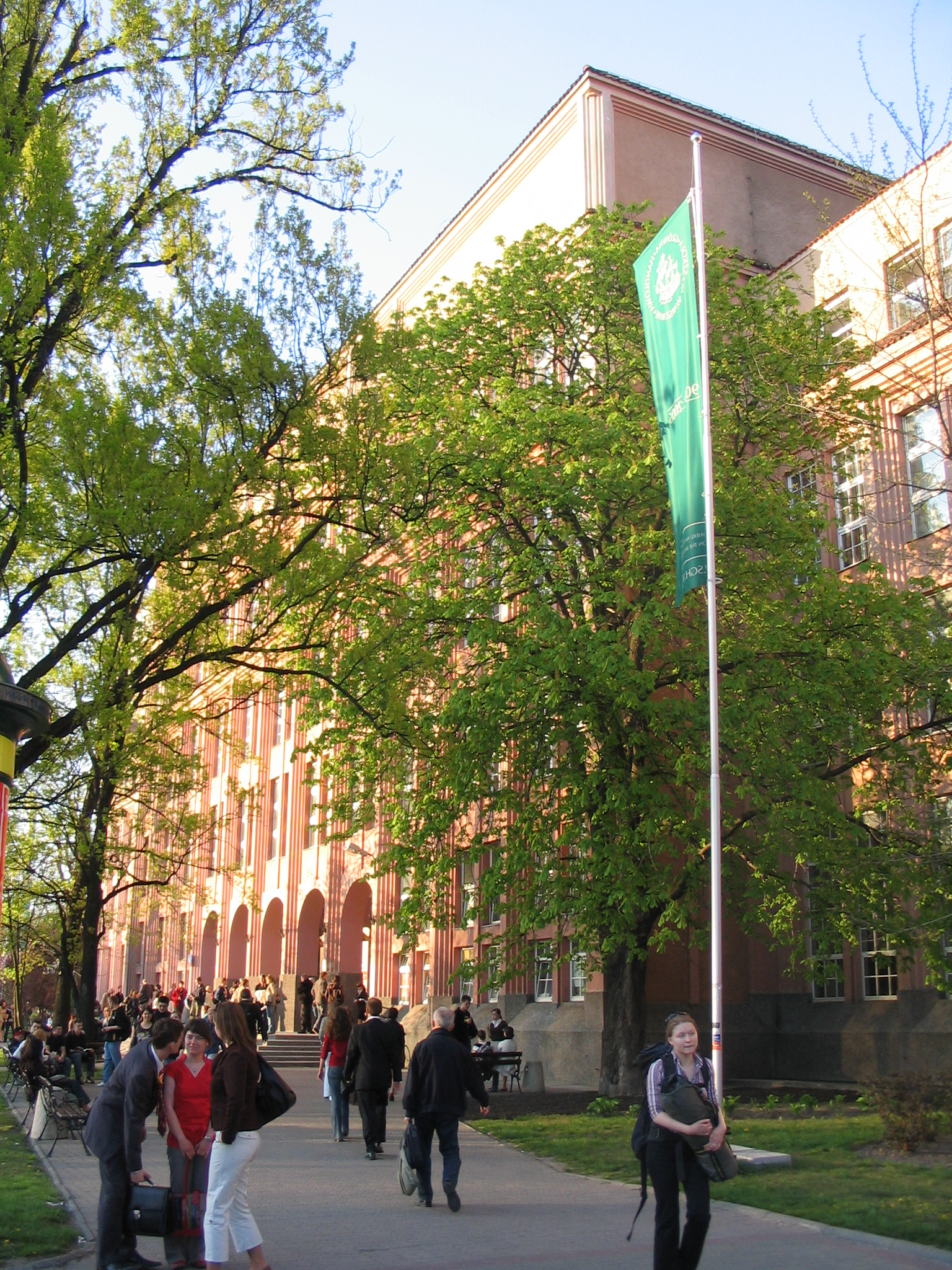
Warsaw School of Economics.

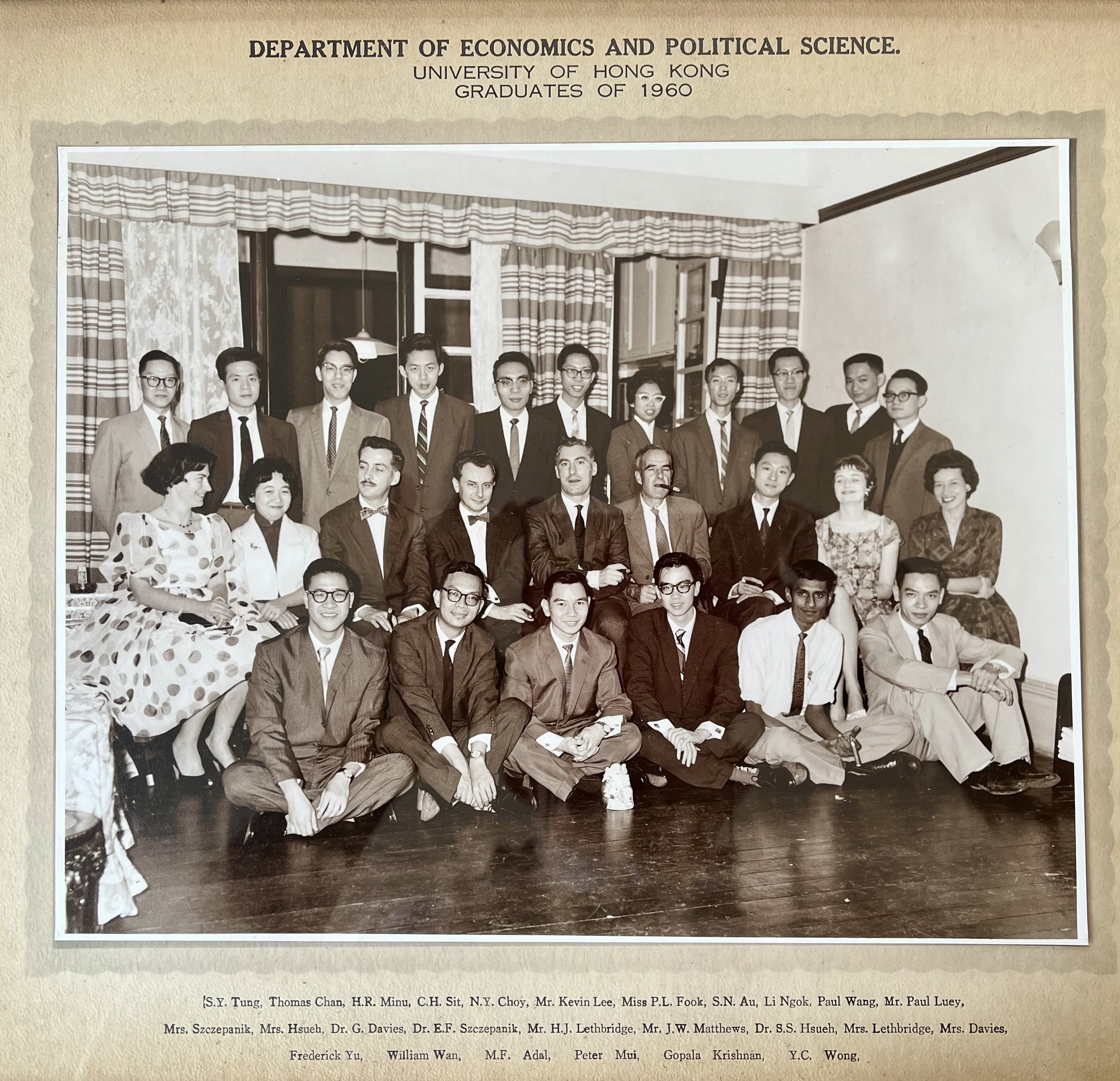
Group photo HKU Dept Economics 1960

Szczepanik's career as an economist encompassed many educational institutions, including:

- assistant lecturer – Warsaw School of Economics, Poland (1938–1939 SGH)
- assistant professor – Polish University College, London (1947–1953)
- senior lecturer – University of Hong Kong (1953–1961)
- advisor – Harvard University Advisory Team, Karachi, Pakistan (1961–1963)
- senior research fellow – University of Sussex, England (1978–1981)
- professor of economics – Polish University Abroad, London (Polski Uniwersytet na Obczyznie – PUNO) 1981.

In addition, Szczepanik also performed consulting for the following:

- United Nations High Commissioner for Refugees (UNHCR), Hong Kong (1954)
- United Nations Economic Commission for Asia and the Far East (UN-ECAFE), Bangkok, Thailand (1956)
- International Coffee Organization (ICO), London (1975)

Szczepanik also worked with the Food and Agricultural Organisation (FAO) of the UN – first as a consultant in Hong Kong from 1954 to 1955; and later as Senior Economist in Rome, Italy from 1963 until 1977.

=== Polish politics ===
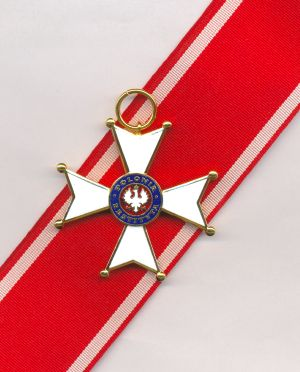
Commander's Cross of the Order of Polonia Restituta ("Poland Restored").

Szczepanik was the founder and chairman of the Polish Institute for Research into National Affairs (Instytut Badań Zagadnień Krajowych) in London during 1951 to 1953 and 1983 to 1986. While in Rome, Italy from 1963 to 1977, he was also the Polish representative to the Holy See – one of only three states that still continued its relations with the Polish Government in Exile. He was a director of the Council for Understanding Research on Poles Living Abroad (Rada Porozumiewawcza Badań nad Polonią), and was President of the Polish Society of Arts and Sciences Abroad (Polskie Towarzystwo Naukowe na Obczyźnie – PTNO) in London. In 1981, he also became the Minister of Home Affairs of the Polish Government in Exile. On 7 April 1986 he was chosen the successor of Kazimierz Sabbat to be the next Prime Minister of that government. After Sabbat's death, his successor as the president of Poland in exile, Ryszard Kaczorowski, asked him to continue with his mission, which ended in 1990. This is when Szczepanik's cabinet advised their last President in Exile to accept the invitation of Poland's Speaker of the Senate to transfer the Flag and other Office pre-war Insignia to Lech Wałęsa in Warsaw, as the "President of the Republic elected by Polish people in free general elections".

=== Polish honours ===
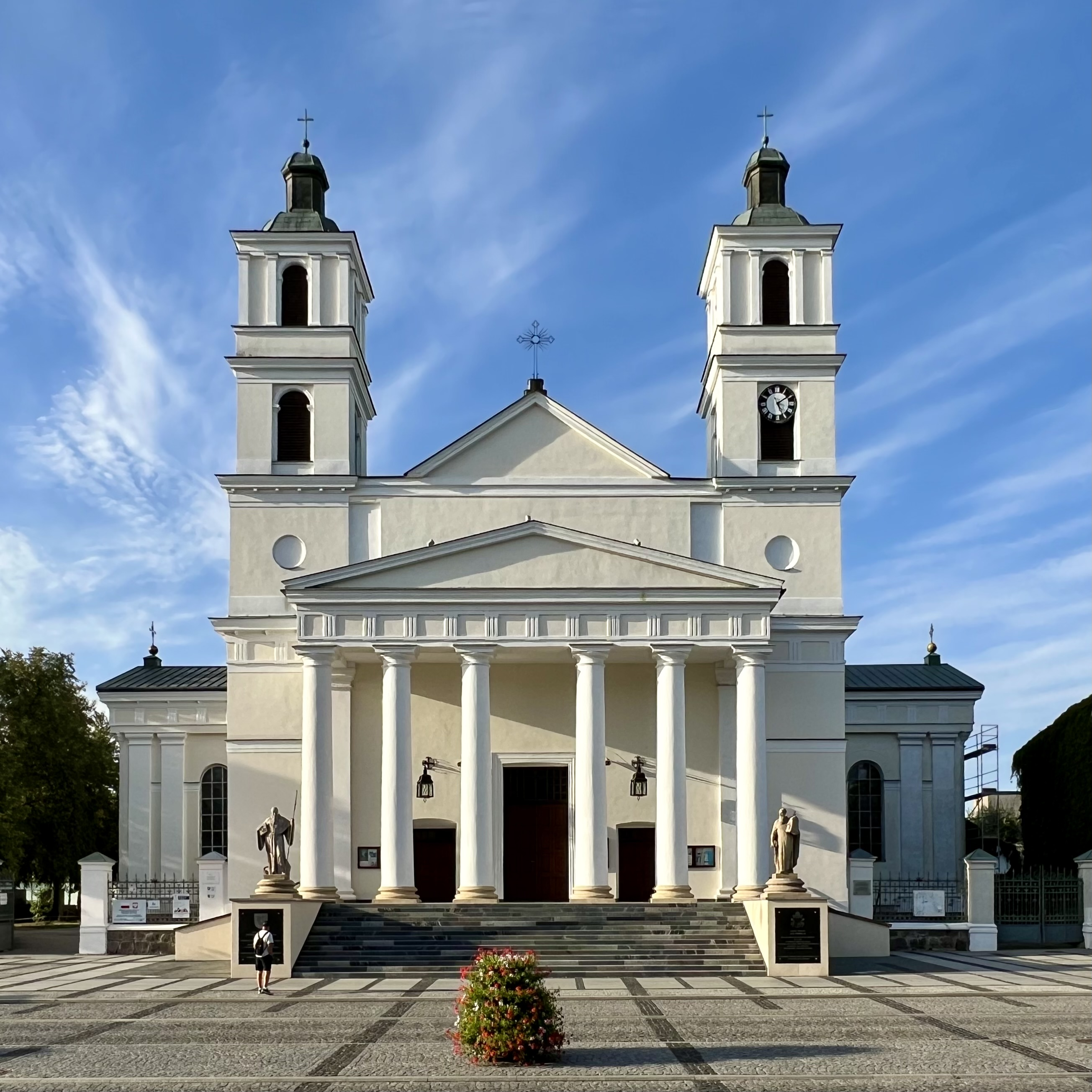
St. Alexander's Church, Suwałki.

Szczepanik was honoured to be named a Knight of the Order of Polonia Restituta by the Polish Government in Exile in 1981. In 1982 he obtained the freedom of his native town of Suwałki as its honorary citizen. The President of the Republic of Poland in London awarded him with a Commander's Star in 1985, to which a Grand Sash was added in 1989.

He was awarded the title of Doctor of Economic Science – Honoris Causa in 1995 by the Warsaw School of Economics. In 1996, Szczepanik received from the starost (mayor) of Powiat of Suwałki the Medal for Merits to the Powiat of Suwałki; and from Poland's Minister of Culture, the Medal for Merits to Polish Culture.

Szczepanik died on 11 October 2005 in Worcestershire. His ashes were buried with military honours in his home town of Suwałki following a requiem mass at St Alexander's Church.

== Works ==
- Zagadnienia neutralnego pieniądza. (Warsaw, 1938) SGH
- Factors determining the mark of interest. (MSc (Econ.) (London) thesis LSE, 1953)
- Zarys polityki dobrobytu gospodarczego. (London, 1953)
- A study in the economic problems of central & eastern Europe. Lectures. (London, 1954)
- co-author MA, Ronald A., The National Income of Hong Kong, 1947–1950. (Hong Kong University Press: Hong Kong, 1955)
- The Cost of Living in Hong Kong. (Hong Kong University Press: Hong Kong, 1956)
- The Economic Growth of Hong Kong (with special reference to the post-war industrialisation). (University of London / Oxford University Press: London, 1958) cf. /Britannica
- Editor, The Economic Role of Middlemen and Co-operatives in Indo-Pacific Fisheries. (Food and Agriculture Organization of the United Nations, Rome, 1960)
- Editor, Economic and social problems of the Far East : Symposium : Golden jubilee congress : Papers and discussions. (Hong Kong University Press, 1962)
- National accounting as a tool of economic planning. (Lectures). (Mouton & Co.: The Hague, 1965)
- Agricultural policies at different levels of development. (Rome, 1976)
- Kształtowanie się poglądów polskiego ruchu oporu na politykę gospodarczą. (London, 1979) SGH
- co-author Duchêne, François, New limits on European agriculture : politics and the Common Agricultural Policy. (Totowa: Rowman & Allanheld / Croom Helm, London, 1985.) ISBN 0-8476-7375-8 (US) / ISBN 0-7099-0858-X (UK) cf. Duchêne
- Editor, Napaść sowiecka i okupacja polskich ziem wschodnich, wrzesień 1939. (Polskie Towarzystwo Naukowe na Obczyźnie, Polska Fundacja Kulturalna, London, 1985) ISBN 0-85065-165-4 / (Warsaw : Międzyzakładowa Struktura "Solidarności" V, 1985)
- Editor, Kongres Kultury Polskiej Ojczyzna w sercach : pokłosie kongresowe : prace Kongresu Kultury Polskiej : tom 1 (Polskie Towarzystwo Naukowe na Obczyżnie, London, 1986) ISBN 1-870027-06-X
- Editor, The Polish Cultural And Scientific Heritage at the Dawn of the Third Millennium (Polish Society of Arts and Sciences Abroad, 240 King Street, London, W6 ORF, 2003) ISBN 1-870027-02-7
