= Elżbieta Kępińska =

Polish actress (born 1937)

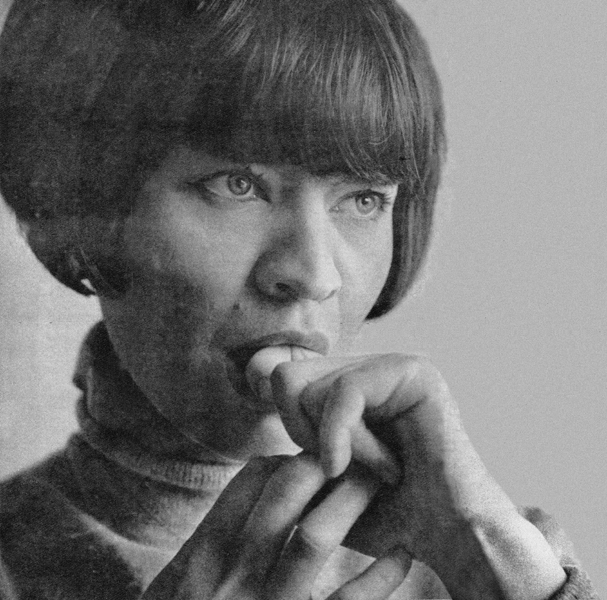
- Elzbieta Kepinska, 1967
- Born: 5 April 1937 (age 89); Częstochowa, Poland
- Occupation: Actress
- Years active: 1960–present

Elżbieta Kępińska (born 5 April 1937) is a Polish film actress. She has appeared in more than 20 films and television shows since 1960, including Samson (1961), Grzech Antoniego Grudy (1975) and Dotkniecie nocy (1962). She was married to Polish communist politician Mieczysław Rakowski until his death in 2008.

== Selected filmography ==
- Tonight a City Will Die (1961) as Worker
- Samson (1961) as Kazia
- All Friends Here (1962) as Jadwiga "Jadźka" Kargul (voice)
- Everything for Sale (1969) as Actress in Theatre
- Cicha noc (2017) as Adam's grandmother
