= Kazimierz Sabbat =

Polish exile politician (1913–1989)

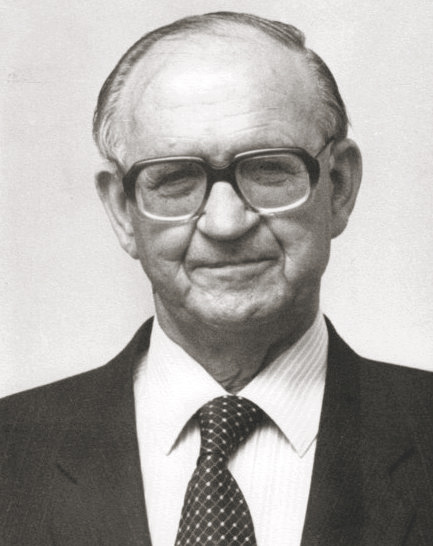

President of Poland
- in-exile 8 April 1986 – 19 July 1989
- Prime Minister: Edward Szczepanik
- Head of State in country: Henryk Jabłoński; Wojciech Jaruzelski
- Preceded by: Edward Bernard Raczyński
- Succeeded by: Ryszard Kaczorowski

Prime Minister of Poland
- in-exile 5 August 1976 – 8 April 1986
- President: Stanisław Ostrowski; Edward Bernard Raczyński
- Counterparts in country: Piotr Jaroszewicz; Edward Babiuch; Józef Pińkowski; Wojciech Jaruzelski; Zbigniew Messner
- Preceded by: Alfred Urbański
- Succeeded by: Edward Szczepanik

Personal details
- Born: Kazimierz Aleksander Sabbat; 27 February 1913 Bieliny Kapitulne, Kielce Governorate, Congress Poland, Russian Empire
- Died: 19 July 1989 (aged 76) London, England
- Cause of death: Heart attack
- Party: Independent
- Spouse: Anna Sulik
- Profession: Businessman, politician

Kazimierz Aleksander Sabbat (27 February 1913 – 19 July 1989), was President of Poland-in-exile from 8 April 1986 until his death, 19 July 1989, after serving (from 1976) as Prime Minister of the Polish government-in-exile.

== Early life ==
Sabbat was born on 27 February 1913 in Bieliny Kapitulne, at the foot of the Lysa Gora mountain. Sabbat completed secondary school in Mielec, and studied law at the Warsaw University shortly before World War II. He was a Scout, and remained dedicated to the concept of Scouting, even in his later life while in-exile.

== World War II ==
After a short service in the Navy, Sabbat was directed to the Motorised Brigade of Stanisław Maczek. Wounded during the Polish retreat in 1939, he managed to reach Great Britain, where he was directed to the British General Staff as an officer responsible for youth.

== Post war ==
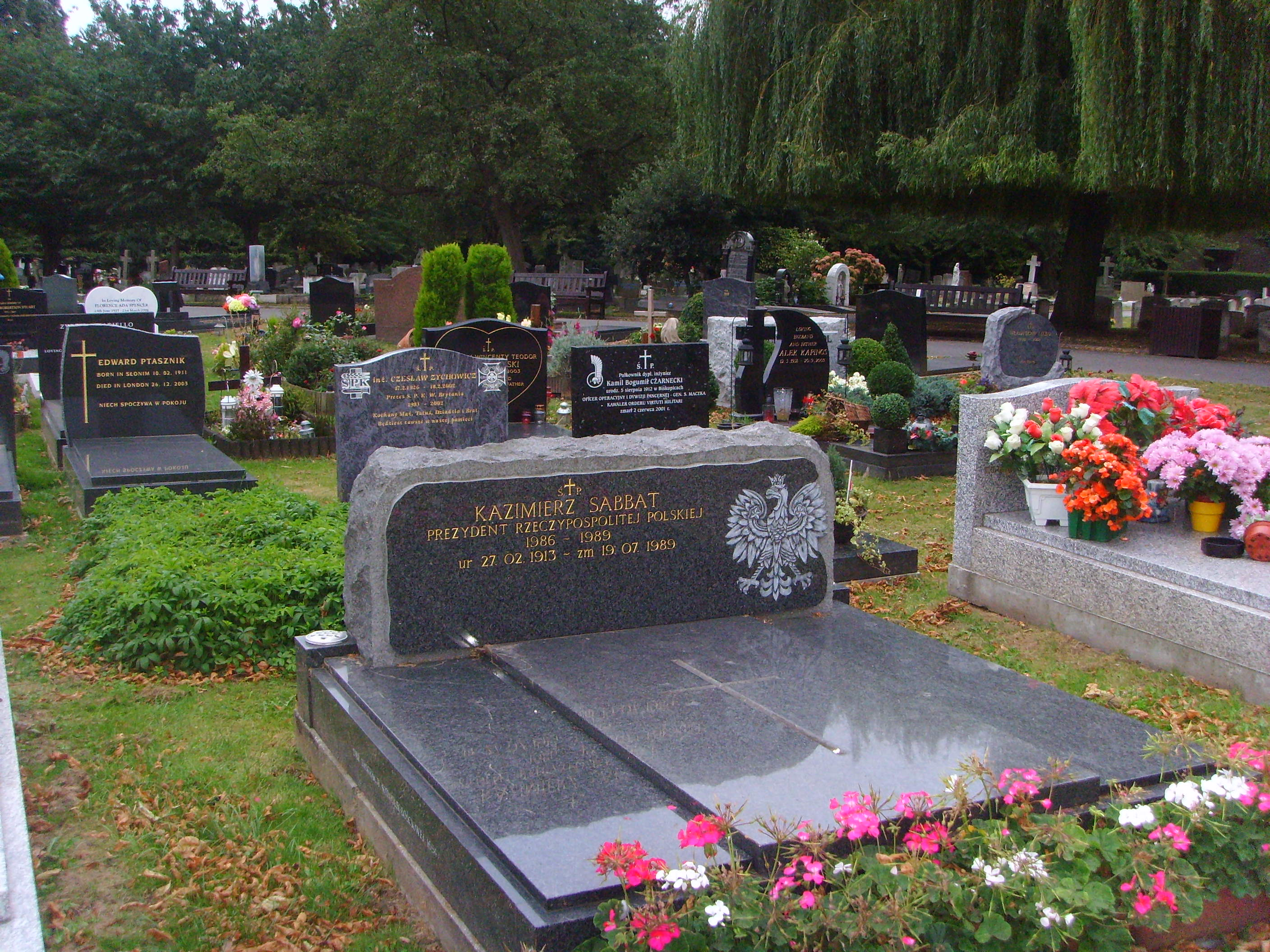
Grave of President Kazimierz Sabbat

After being discharged from the army in 1948, he started up his own successful business in England. He later worked for the Scouting Organization and the "Association of Polish Veterans" on a voluntary basis.

As an executive of the National Union, he managed the Treasury Division, and in 1976 became the Prime Minister of the Polish government-in-exile. He attempted to unite the various émigré circles and created ever stronger links with the opposition movement in Poland, which benefited from the Government in exile's moral and material help through different Funds.

He became President of the Republic of Poland (in-exile) in 1986, succeeding Edward Bernard Raczyński. He died in London, aged 76, in 1989. Coincidentally, on the same day, Wojciech Jaruzelski was elected by a still unfree Parliament as the first President of the country since the 1950s. Ryszard Kaczorowski, Minister of Domestic Affairs and designated successor, took office in-exile and on 22 December 1990, after the first free and fair elections in Poland since the war, handed his powers and the insignia of the Polish Second Republic to President-elect Lech Wałęsa.

Sabbat is buried in Gunnersbury Cemetery in London, along with Anna Sabbat, who died on 28 April 2015. Their children all still live in areas near London. He has eight grandchildren.

Political offices
Preceded by Alfred Urbański	Prime Minister of the Republic of Poland in-exile 1976–1986	Succeeded by Edward Szczepanik
Preceded by Edward Bernard Raczyński	President of the Republic of Poland in-exile 1986–1989	Succeeded by Ryszard Kaczorowski
