= Stanisław Ostrowski =

Polish politician (1892–1982)

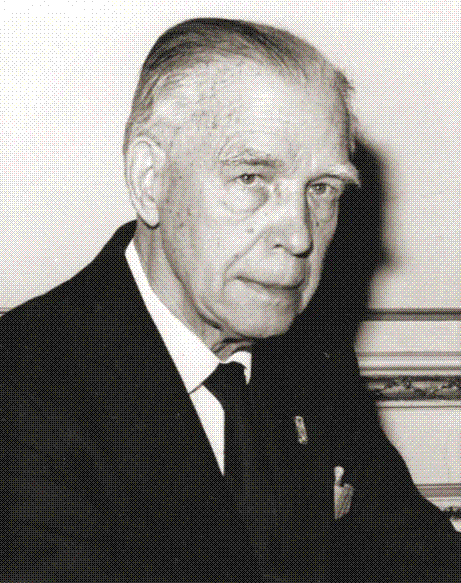

President of Poland
- in-exile 9 April 1972 – 24 March 1979
- Prime Minister: Alfred Urbański; Kazimierz Sabbat
- Head of State in country: Henryk Jabłoński
- Preceded by: August Zaleski; Rada Trzech
- Succeeded by: Edward Bernard Raczyński

Mayor of Lwów
- In office 1936–1939
- Preceded by: Wacław Drojanowski
- Succeeded by: Post liquidated, Fedir Yeremenko as head of the city executive committee

Personal details
- Born: 29 October 1892 Lemberg, then Austria-Hungary
- Died: 22 November 1982 (aged 90) London, England
- Party: BBWR (in country); Polish Socialist Party (exile)

Stanisław Ostrowski (29 October 1892 – 22 November 1982) was a Polish physician and politician, best known for serving as the last Polish Mayor of Lwów, and was President of Poland-in-exile.

== Life and career ==
Ostrowski was born in Lemberg, Kingdom of Galicia and Lodomeria. His father, Michał Ostrowski, had earlier fought in the pro-Polish January Uprising of 1863 for which he was sent to the Russian katorga in Siberia.

Stanisław Ostrowski studied medicine at Lwów University. During the Polish-Ukrainian War (battle of Lwów (1918)) and the Polish-Bolshevik War (1919–1920), Ostrowski participated as a physician with the Polish Army. Following these conflicts, he became Vice Mayor, and later Mayor, of Lwów. He was also a three-term member of the Sejm from the BBWR Bloc. As a legislator, he focused on health affairs as well as developing a reputation for being a defender of minorities' rights.

After the Soviet invasion of Poland (1939), he was arrested and imprisoned in Moscow (until 1941). Among his fellow prisoners was Anandyn Amar, former Prime Minister and President of Mongolia. He was released from Soviet captivity on amnesty following the Sikorski–Mayski agreement as an officer of the Polish Army in the East by efforts of (commander-in-chief general Władysław Anders) in 1942.

In 1944–1945, he participated in the anti-Nazi Germany Italian campaign as a physician of military hospitals. When World War II ended, he moved to England and became involved in the politics of the Polish community there, which included the Polish government-in-exile.

Ostrowski was the third president of Poland in exile (1972–1979). He took office after the death of President August Zaleski. To begin with, he had to deal with a deep crisis within the emigre circles. Zaleski, despite earlier promises, declined to step down after seven years in office (1954), which caused the formation of the Council of Three, an opposition body, recognised by a part of the emigres as a collective head of state. Ostrowski's selection was recognized by the council, which then dissolved itself. Because of that, Ostrowski is credited with uniting Polish emigre circles. He also strongly refused to acknowledge the annexation of the eastern areas of the Second Polish Republic by the USSR after World War II.

As promised, President Ostrowski stepped down after a seven-year term in favor of Edward Bernard Raczyński.

Ostrowski died in London and was buried in a Polish military cemetery in Newark-on-Trent, along with August Zaleski and Władysław Raczkiewicz, other past Presidents in exile. In November 2022, the trio's remains were moved from the cemetery at Newark-on-Trent in England to the mausoleum for emigre presidents at the Temple of Divine Providence in Warsaw.

In 1987, a plaque dedicated to Ostrowski was unveiled in the St. Stanislaus Kostka Church, Warsaw.

Ostrowski died without children.

== See also ==
- List of mayors of Lviv

== Bibliography ==
- Biography from an official Presidential website
- The last President of Lviv
- Ostrowski memories

Political offices
Preceded by August Zaleski	President of the Polish Republic-in-exile; 1972–1979	Succeeded by Edward Bernard Raczyński
