= Lilpop =

The Lilpop family was a dynasty of artisans and industrialists in Warsaw, Poland.

== History ==
The ancestor of the family's Polish branch was Antoni Augustyn Lilpop, from Graz, Austria, who settled in Warsaw in the final years of the reign of King Augustus III of Poland and in 1789 founded a watchmaking firm. The firm existed until 1939, when it was destroyed by German bombs.

The best-known Lilpop company was The Industrial Society of the Lilpop, Rau & Loewenstein Mechanical Factory, one of the biggest metallurgic factories in the Polish Kingdom and the II Republic. The factory was destroyed during the Second World War.

Family descendants have included:

- Stanisław Lilpop (1817–1866), mechanical engineer, inventor, founder of Lilpop, Rau i Loewenstein in Warsaw;
- Stanisław Wilhelm Lilpop (2014), son of Stanisław, industrialist, traveler, founder of the town of Podkowa Leśna;
- Ludwik F.M. Lilpop, (1845–1905), watchmaker and philanthropist, president of the parish council of the Lutheran Church in Warsaw;
- Edward August Lilpop (1844–1911), Warsaw architect;
- Franciszek Lilpop (1870–1937), Warsaw architect;
- Stefan Ludwik Lilpop (1872–1923), watchmaker, collector, patron of art and theatre;
- Wacław Lilpop (1887–1949), urologist, founder of Polish Urological Society;
- Jerzy Lilpop (1888–1945), botanist (paleobotanist), curator of the botanical section of the Natural Museum PAN in Cracow;
- Zbigniew Lilpop (2000), electrical engineer, expert in municipal transport.

== Bibliography ==
- Eugeniusz Szulc, Cmentarz Ewangelicko-Augsburski w Warszawie, Warsaw 1989.
- Stanisław Szenic, "Cmentarz Powązkowski 1851-1890", PWN 1982.
- Necrology, "Gazeta Wyborcza" 28 Sept. 2007
