= Henryk Jabłoński =

Polish politician (1909–2003)

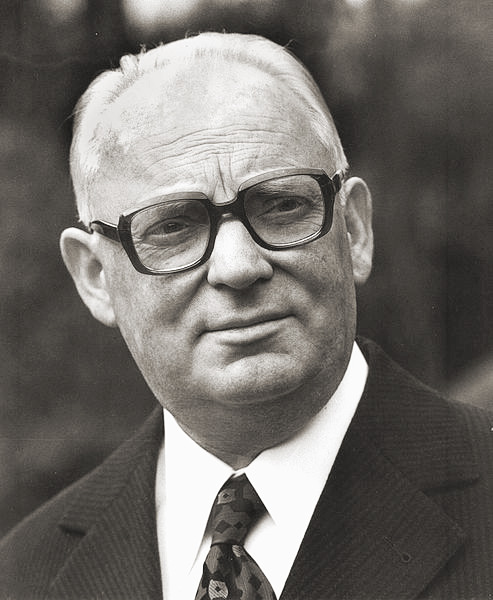

5th Chairman of the Council of State of the People's Republic of Poland
- In office 28 March 1972 – 6 November 1985
- President in-exile: August Zaleski; Council of Three; Stanisław Ostrowski; Edward Bernard Raczyński
- Preceded by: Józef Cyrankiewicz
- Succeeded by: Wojciech Jaruzelski

Personal details
- Born: 27 December 1909 Stary Waliszew, Congress Poland, Russian Empire
- Died: 27 January 2003 (aged 93) Warsaw, Poland
- Party: Polish Socialist Party; Polish United Workers' Party
- Spouse: Jadwiga Jabłońska
- Profession: Historian

Henryk Jan Jabłoński (Note: Polish pronunciation: [ˈxɛnrɨk jaˈbwɔɲskʲi]) (27 December 1909 – 27 January 2003) was a Polish historian and politician. After 1948, he became a politician of the ruling Polish United Workers' Party, as well as a historian and professor at Warsaw University. He served as head of state of the People's Republic of Poland between 1972 and 1985.

== Life and career ==
Jabłoński was born in Stary Waliszew in the Warsaw Governorate of Congress Poland. From 1931, he was a member of the Polish Socialist Party (PPS). During World War II, he fought in the Battle of Narvik (Norway) and then joined the French Resistance. In 1945 Jabłoński became a member of the State National Council (KRN), and during the years 1946 and 1948 he had high functions in the PPS (chairman of Central State Committee and its vice-leader). He approved joining the PPS with the Polish Workers' Party (PPR, Polska Partia Robotnicza).

From 1947 to 1972, he was a deputy to the Sejm. In 1948, he was appointed professor at Warsaw University (from 1952 member of Polish Academy of Sciences – PAN). Between 1948 and 1981, Henryk Jabłoński was in the Central Committee of the Polish United Workers' Party (KC PZPR).

In 1972, on the initiative of Edward Gierek, Jablonski was chosen the de iure leader (chairman of the Council of State) of the People's Republic of Poland. From 1976 to 1983, he was the chief of the Front of National Unity (FJN, Front Jedności Narodu). From 1983 to 1990, he was chief of ZBoWiD, the Society of Fighters for Freedom and Democracy, an organisation of war veterans. In 1985, he was replaced as head of state by General Wojciech Jaruzelski. His wife Jadwiga Jabłońska died in 1999.

== Honours and awards ==
- Grand Cross of the Order of Polonia Restituta, earlier Commander's Cross
- Order of the Builders of People's Poland
- Order of the Banner of Labour, 1st class
- Officer's Cross of Order of Polonia Restituta
- Golden Cross of Merit with Swords
- Order of the Cross of Grunwald, 3rd class
- Deed Combat Cross Polish Armed Forces in the West (1989)
- Medal of the 10th Anniversary of People's Poland
- Medal of the 30th Anniversary of People's Poland
- Medal of the 40th Anniversary of People's Poland
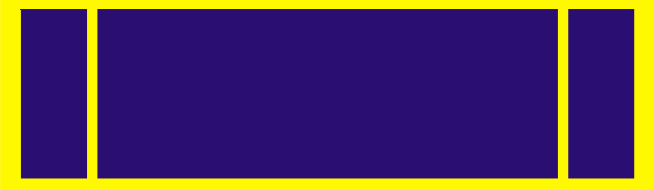
- Badge of the honorary title "Meritorious Teacher of the Polish People's Republic"
- Golden Medal of Merit for National Defence
- Silver Medal of Merit for National Defence
- Bronze Medal od Merit for National Defence
- Medal of the National Education Commission
- Medal of Ludwik Waryński
- Badge of the 1000th Anniversary of the Polish State
- Great Star of Honour of the Order of Merit of the Republic of Austria
- Grand Cordon of the Order of Leopold (Belgium)
- Order of Georgi Dimitrov (Bulgaria)
- 100th anniversary of the birth of Georgi Dimitrov Medal (Bulgaria)
- 1300th Anniversary Of Bulgarian Foreigners Medal (Bulgaria)
- Order of the White Lion, First Class with Chain (CSSR)
- Order of the White Lion Third Class (CSSR)
- Hungarian Order of Merit (Hungary)
- Order of the Flag of the Republic of Hungary, 1st class (Hungary)
- Grand Cross of the Légion d'honneur (France)
- Volunteer Combatant's Cross (France)
- Order of the Two Rivers, 1st Class (Iraq)
- Order of José Marti (Cuba)
- Collars of the Order of the Aztec Eagle (Mexico)
- Order of Sukhbaatar (Mongolia)
- Great Chain of the Order of Prince Henry the Navigator (Portugal)
- Great Banner of the Order of the Umayyads (Syria)
- Order of the October Revolution (USSR)
- Order of Friendship of Peoples (USSR)
- Order of the Badge of Honour (USSR)
- Jubilee Medal "Twenty Years of Victory in the Great Patriotic War 1941–1945" (USSR)
- Jubilee Medal "Thirty Years of Victory in the Great Patriotic War 1941–1945" (USSR)
- Jubilee Medal "Forty Years of Victory in the Great Patriotic War 1941–1945" (USSR)
- Jubilee Medal "60 Years of the Armed Forces of the USSR"
- Jubilee Medal "70 Years of the Armed Forces of the USSR"
- State Award, Grade II – 1955
- State Prize – 1964
- Special National Award – 1979

== Notes ==
Political offices
Preceded by Józef Cyrankiewicz	Chairman of the Polish Council of State; 1972 – 1985	Succeeded by Wojciech Jaruzelski
