= Zbigniew Messner =

Polish communist politician and economist (1929–2014)

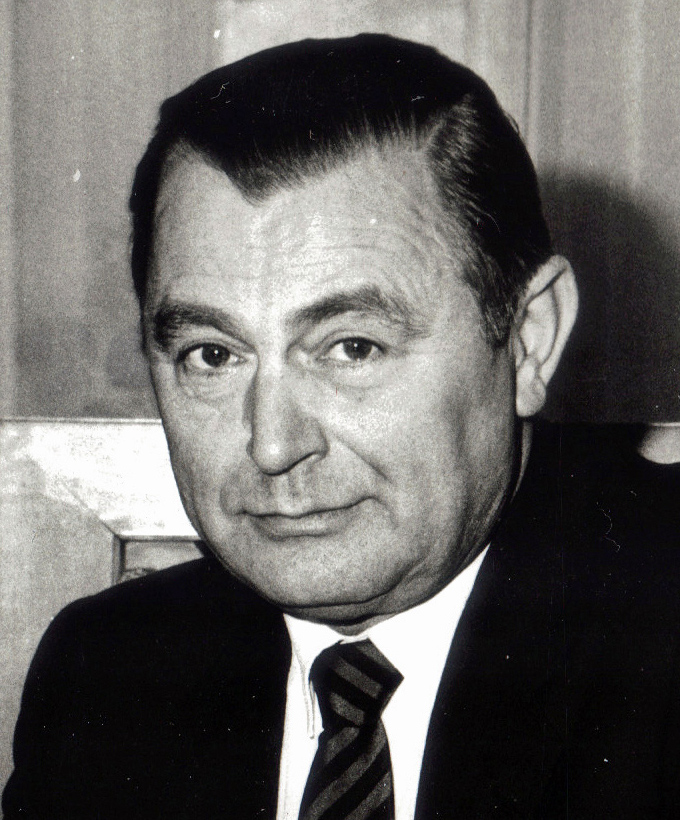
- Messner in 1988

Prime Minister of Poland
- In office 6 November 1985 – 27 September 1988 Serving with Kazimierz Sabbat and Edward Szczepanik (in-exile)
- Preceded by: Wojciech Jaruzelski
- Succeeded by: Mieczysław Rakowski

Member of Sejm
- In office 6 November 1985 – 30 May 1989

Personal details
- Born: Zbigniew Stefan Messner; 13 March 1929 Stryj, Stanisławów Voivodeship, Second Polish Republic (now Stryi, Ukraine)
- Died: 10 January 2014 (aged 84) Warsaw, Poland
- Party: Polish United Workers' Party (1954–1990)
- Profession: Economist

Zbigniew Stefan Messner (Note: Polish pronunciation: [ˈzbiɡɲɛf ˈmɛsnɛr]) (13 March 1929 – 10 January 2014) was a Polish communist politician and economist. His ancestors were of German Polish descent who had assimilated into Polish society. In 1972, he became Professor of Karol Adamiecki University of Economics in Katowice. In the 1980s, Messner held numerous high ranking posts within communist party apparatus. He was a member of the Central Committee of the Polish United Workers' Party (PZPR) from 1981 to 1990, when PZPR was dissolved, member of the PZPR Politburo from 1981 to 1988, Deputy Prime Minister from 1983 to 1985, member of Sejm from 1985 to 1989, Prime Minister of Polish People's Republic from 1985 to 1988 and member of the State Council of the Polish People's Republic from 1988 to 1989. Additionally in the 1960s Messner was the chairman of Piast Gliwice football club.

== Early life ==
Messner was born on 13 March 1929 in Stryj, then located in Poland (now Stryi, Ukraine). After Soviet annexation of former Polish eastern regions in 1945, his family decided to leave Stryj and move to Gliwice. In 1953 Messner graduated Karol Adamiecki University of Economics in Katowice, where he continued to work in the following years as an academic worker.

== Political career ==
In 1954, Messner joined PZPR. In 1980, he became the chairman of the Katowice Voivodeship National Council. In the following year, Messner was appointed First Secretary of the Voivodeship Committee of the PZPR in Katowice and a member of the PZPR Central Committee and Politburo. There he started to collaborate with Wojciech Jaruzelski, then prime minister and leader of the PZPR, who in 1983 made Messner his Deputy Prime Minister, responsible for economic affairs. In 1985, when Jaruzelski became the Chairman of the Council of State and resigned from the Prime Minister's office, he appointed Messner as his successor. This move was not caused by Messner's competence, but his loyalty and subjugation to Jaruzelski.

As an economist and now Prime Minister, Messner was tasked by Jaruzelski with the implementation of some market elements into the planned economy system in order to save the Polish economy from collapse, while preventing political liberalisation. Messner's cabinet work led to the adaptation of several bills, which included, e.g., increasing the independence of state enterprises, allowing for the creation of private banks and privatisation, etc.

However, Messner's reforms coincided with drastic price increases and further economic recession. Moreover, the referendum on economic reforms in 1987, proposed by the government, turned out to be a failure, because it did not receive enough votes to make its result binding. In 1988, a wave of strikes organized by the opposition's "Solidarity" trade union spread throughout the country. Messner came under pressure from both opposition and other factions within PZPR. In the Sejm (Parliament), members of the pro-communist All-Poland Alliance of Trade Unions (OPZZ) started to speak against Messner. The criticism within the Communist Party forced Jaruzelski to pressure Messener to resign. Messner eventually resigned in September 1988, justifying his decision with "health problems" and had to transfer power to Mieczysław Rakowski. After his resignation, Jaruzelski gave him a seat in the Council of State, in which Messner remained until the abolishment of the council, creation of the office of President of Poland and presidential election in July 1989.

== Later life ==
After 1989, Messner retreated from political life and returned to his academic career. He died in Warsaw on 10 January 2014.

== Awards and decorations ==
- Order of the Banner of Labour, 1st Class
- Commander's Cross with Star of Order of Polonia Restituta (1997)
- Commander's Cross of Order of Polonia Restituta
- Knight's Cross of Order of Polonia Restituta
- Medal of the 40th Anniversary of People's Poland (1984)
- Medal for Long Marital Life (2000)
- Medal of the National Education Commission
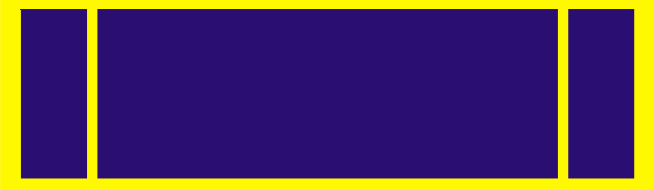
- Badge of the honorary title "Meritorious Teacher of the Polish People's Republic"
- Golden Star of Peoples' Friendship (East Germany, 1986)
- Jubilee Medal "Forty Years of Victory in the Great Patriotic War 1941–1945" (USSR, 1985)
- Medal of 100th Anniversary of the Birth of Georgi Dimitrov (Bulgaria, 1983)

== Notes ==
Government offices
Preceded by Wojciech Jaruzelski	Prime Minister of Poland; 1985 – 1988	Succeeded by Mieczysław Rakowski
