= Saint Stanislaus =

Saint Stanislaus, Saint Stanisław or Saint Stanislav may refer to:

== People ==
- Stanislaus of Szczepanów (1030–79), Roman Catholic bishop and martyr
- Stanisław Kazimierczyk (1433–89), Roman Catholic canon regular
- Stanislaus Kostka (1550–68), Polish Jesuit novice who died at the age of 17
- Stanislav Nasadil (1907–1941), Orthodox hieromartyr

== Schools ==
- St Stanislaus College (Bathurst), Australia, a secondary school
- St. Stanislaus College (Guyana), Georgetown, Guyana, a secondary school
- St. Stanislaus High School, Bandra, Mumbai, India
- St. Stanislaus High School (Detroit), Michigan, United States

== Other uses ==
- St. Stanislaus Church (disambiguation)
- Order of Saint Stanislaus (disambiguation)

== See also ==
- Stanislav (disambiguation)
