= Order of Saint Stanislaus (disambiguation) =

The Order of Saint Stanislaus may refer to:

== Orders of knighthood ==
- Order of Saint Stanislaus, a Polish order of knighthood founded in 1765, incorporated into the Russian Empire in 1831
- Order of Saint Stanislaus (House of Romanov), a Russian order of knighthood of the House of Romanov constituted in 1831 as an incorporation of the order found in Poland

== Orders of merit ==
- Order of Polonia Restituta, a Polish state order founded in 1921

== Other uses ==
- Ordo Sancti Stanislai, a Polish self-styled order founded in 1979
- International Order of Saint Stanislaus, a Polish fraternal order founded in 2004
