= St. Stanislaus Church =

St. Stanislaus Church or St. Stanislaus Catholic Church or variants thereof, may refer to:

== Belarus ==
- Co-Cathedral of the Assumption of the Virgin and St. Stanislaus, Mogilev

== Italy ==
- Santo Stanislao dei Polacchi, Rome

== Lithuania ==
- Vilnius Cathedral

== Poland ==
- Saint Stanislaus of Szczepanów's Church, Bydgoszcz
- Church of St. Michael the Archangel and St. Stanislaus Bishop and Martyr, Kraków
- Świdnica Cathedral
- St. Stanislaus Kostka Church (Warsaw), or the Sanctuary of Blessed Jerzy Popiełuszko
- Wawel Cathedral
- St Dorothea Church, Wrocław
- St Stanislaus Church, Żelechów

== Ukraine ==
- Saint Stanislaus Church in Chortkiv

== United States ==
- St. Stanislaus Parish (Bristol, Connecticut)
- St. Stanislaus Parish (Meriden, Connecticut)
- St. Stanislaus Parish (New Haven, Connecticut)
- St. Stanislaus Kostka Parish, Waterbury, Waterbury, Connecticut
- St. Stanislaus Catholic Church (Lewiston, Idaho), listed on the NRHP in Idaho
- St. Stanislaus Kostka Mission, Rathdrum, Idaho, listed on the NRHP in Idaho
- St. Stanislaus Catholic Church (South Bend, Indiana)
- St. Stanislaus Bishop and Martyr Roman Catholic Church, Detroit, Michigan, listed on the NRHP in Michigan
- Church of St. Stanislaus-Catholic, Winona, Minnesota, listed on the NRHP in Minnesota
- St. Stanislaus Kostka Church (St. Louis, Missouri), St. Louis, Missouri, listed on the NRHP in Missouri
- St. Stanislaus Kostka Church (Rochester, New York)
- St. Stanislaus Catholic Church (Omaha, Nebraska)
- St. Stanislaus Catholic Church (Nashua, New Hampshire)
- Saint Stanislaus Roman Catholic Church Complex, Amsterdam, New York, listed on the NRHP in New York
- Church of St. Stanislaus, Bishop and Martyr (Buffalo, New York), Buffalo, New York
- St. Stanislaus Church Historic District, Warsaw, North Dakota, listed on the NRHP in North Dakota
- St. Stanislaus Church (Cleveland, Ohio), listed on the NRHP in Ohio
- St. Stanislaus Institute, Newport Township, Pennsylvania, listed on the NRHP in Pennsylvania
- St. Stanislaus Kostka Church (Pittsburgh), Pittsburgh, Pennsylvania, listed on the NRHP in Pennsylvania
- St. Stanislaus Cathedral (Scranton, Pennsylvania)
- St. Stanislaus Catholic Church (Milwaukee, Wisconsin)

== See also ==
- Saint Stanislaus (disambiguation)
- Stanislav (disambiguation)
