= Eques auratus =

Eques auratus (Latin for "gilded knight"; abbreviated eq. aur.) may refer to:

- Knight Bachelor in the English/British honours system
- Knight of the Golden Spur (Holy Roman Empire)
- Knight of the Golden Spur (Hungary)
