= Sovereign Military and Hospitaller Order of Saint John of Jerusalem, Oecumenical Knights of Malta =

Self-styled order

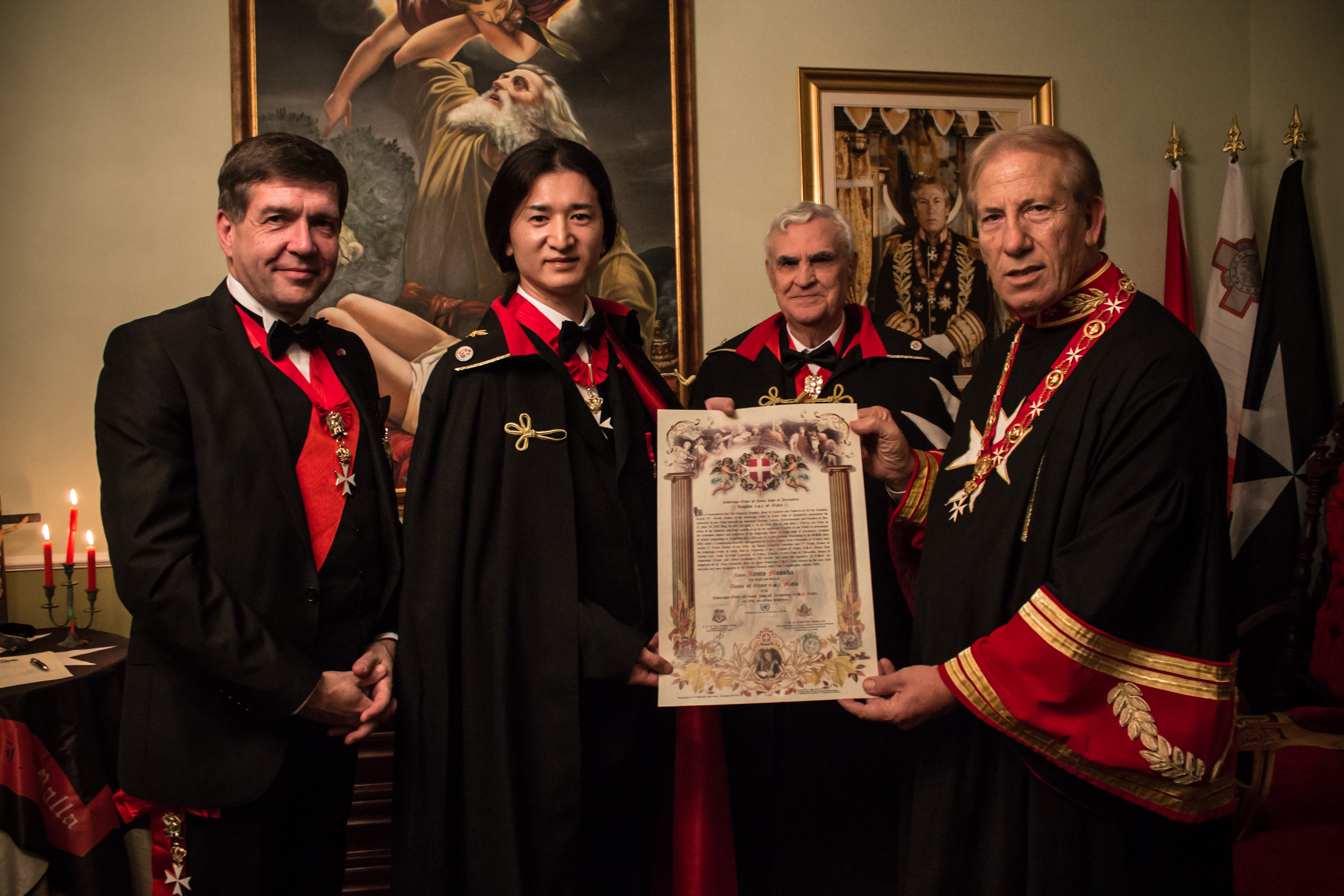
Don. Basilio Cali, grandmaster of the Sovereign Order O.S.J. of Malta, presents a brevet to Japanese musician Kento Masuda

The Sovereign Military and Hospitaller Order of St. John of Jerusalem, Oecumenical Knights of Malta is a self-styled order in the tradition of the Knights Hospitaller. The Order claims descent through the Russian branch of the Knights of Malta. The investiture ceremonies of the Ecumenical Knights of Malta have been held at the First Presbyterian Church in Manhattan. Philanthropic activities have included supporting disaster relief, such as raising $600,000 to help victims of the 1972 Nicaragua earthquake.

The Sovereign Military and Hospitaller Order of St. John of Jerusalem, Oecumenial Knights of Malta is linked to the Glorus Foundation, a charitable trust and shareholder in the Euro-America Finance Holding International - Cayman Islands - Panama. In Germany the same organisation is called the "Kreuz des Südens" or "Cross of the South". The Ecumenical Knights have diplomatic representation with São Tomé and Príncipe.

The organization now known as Ecumenical Knights claim that in 1918 had Grand Duke Alexander Mikhailovich of Russia as fons honorum., although there is no contemporary documentation for this. Following his death, the Order was supposedly headed by Grand Duke Andrei Vladimirovich of Russia, Count Ferdinand von Zeppelin, and Colonel de Cassagnac. After the resignation of Colonel de Cassagnac, the Ecumenical Knights installed King Peter II of Yugoslavia as the grandmaster of the Order. Under King Peter II of Yugoslavia, the Ecumenical Knights adopted a new constitution on June 21, 1965. After his death, Prince Alexis d'Anjou de Bourbon-Conde, Duke of Durazzo became the grandmaster of the Order.

In the view of the Committee on the Orders of Saint John, the Sovereign Military and Hospitaller Order of Saint John of Jerusalem, Oecumenical Knights of Malta is among 21 self-styled orders of St. John that are active as of 2013. The order is not affiliated with the genuine Sovereign Military Hospitaller Order of Saint John of Jerusalem of Rhodes and of Malta, Venerable Order of St John and Order of Saint John (Bailiwick of Brandenburg), which are, respectively, a Roman Catholic, Anglican and Reformed-Lutheran order of Knights-Hospitallers; neither of the genuine Orders of Saint John is fully oecumenical. Their conjoint Committee on Orders of Saint John considers the so-called Sovereign Military and Hospitaller Order of Saint John of Jerusalem, Oecumenical Knights of Malta to be a "false order". According to the Sovereign Military Order of Malta, the self-styled order's name uses the reputation and the trust that are given to the genuine Orders of Saint John. On the other hand, Prince Robert Michael Nicholas George Bassaraba von Brancovan, a leader in the Sovereign Military and Hospitaller Order of Saint John of Jerusalem, Oecumenical Knights of Malta, claimed that Pope Paul VI wished the Order "all the luck in the world" and asserted that "We are a legal entity and have the same rights they do, except we are inane polite. Our members —who are Nobel prize winners, United States generals, foreign ambassadors and Catholic clergymen—are all well aware that they are not in St. Patrick's and feel that there's no reason to have Rome dictate to us."
