= Juliusz Nowina-Sokolnicki =

Pretender to the presidency of the Polish government-in-exile

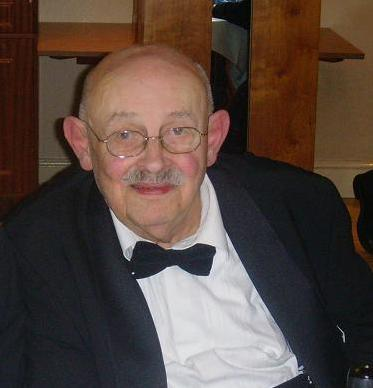
- Nowina-Sokolnicki at the Victory Services Club, 2007
- Born: December 16, 1925; Pińsk, Polesie Voivodeship, Second Polish Republic
- Died: August 17, 2009 (aged 83); Colchester, England
- Known for: Pretender to the presidency of Polish government-in-exile

Juliusz Nowina-Sokolnicki (born December 16, 1925, in Pinsk, d. August 17, 2009 in Colchester, England) was a Polish pretender to presidency and head of one of the two governments which claimed, in 1972, to be the successor to the Polish government-in-exile that was created to replace original Polish government, which fled to Romania in September 1939 at the start of World War II. The legitimacy of his government was disputed.

== Career ==
Nowina-Sokolnicki, who previously held several minor positions such as communications secretary within the Government of the Polish Republic in Exile and was close to President August Zaleski, claimed that Zaleski nominated him as his successor instead of Stanisław Ostrowski. This claim, however, remains disputed, as there is little evidence in support of it. Most of the Polish emigrant community as well as the Government of Poland recognised Ostrowski and his successors as the legitimate Presidents in exile. (Lech Wałęsa accepted symbols of the pre-war presidency from Ryszard Kaczorowski).

Nowina-Sokolnicki is known for establishing the self styled Ordo Sancti Stanislai, an attempted revival of the Polish Order of Saint Stanislaus, founded in 1765. He also used the titles of Count or Prince even though there is no record of any such titles for either himself or his family, and no proof of his kinship to an aristocratic family bearing a similar name. There is no indication that the noble family ever resided in the Pinsk area in present-day Belarus.
