= Self-styled order =

Unrecognized or illegitimate chivalric order

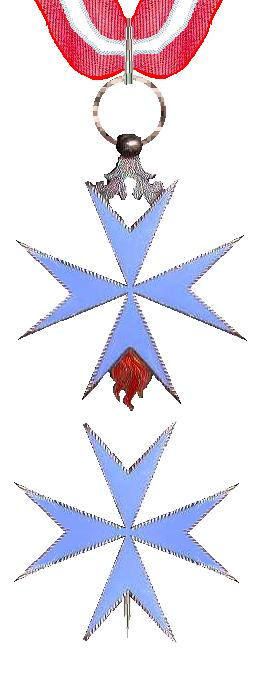
Insignia of the Order of St. Bridget of Sweden, a self-styled order

A self-styled order or pseudo-chivalric order is an organisation which claims to be a chivalric order, but is not recognised as legitimate by countries or international bodies. Most self-styled orders arose in or after the mid-18th century, and many have been created recently. Most are short-lived and endure no more than a few decades.

== Recognition of orders as genuine ==
Many countries do not regulate the wearing of decorations, and remain neutral as to whether any particular order is legitimate or not. Other countries explicitly regulate what decorations are accepted as legitimate. For example, in Sweden, official decisions about medals and orders worn on military uniforms are made by the General Staff.

The criteria of France provide an illustrative example of those nations which take a more regulatory approach: only decorations recognised by the Chancery of the Legion of Honour may be worn publicly, and permission must be sought and granted to wear any foreign awards or decorations. Dynastic orders are prohibited unless the dynasty in question is currently recognised as sovereign. (For example, the Royal Victorian Order is explicitly recognised, whereas the Order of Saints Maurice and Lazarus is not.) Failure to comply is punishable by law. A non-exhaustive list of collectively authorised orders is published by the French government.

Another example is the United Kingdom, where legitimacy of any particular order is determined by the Monarch.

The private organisation International Commission on Orders of Chivalry (ICOC) also maintains a set of principles to evaluate whether a chivalric order is genuine. The ICOC is not officially recognised by any international treaty, and their definition is explicitly rejected by many countries (see examples above of France, UK, and Sweden). The ICOC was created as a temporary committee of the International Congress of Genealogical and Heraldic Sciences in August 1960, though it has been transformed into a permanent and independent international body. The ICOC argues that a chivalric order must have a fount of honour (Latin: fons honorum) as either its founder or its principal patron in order to be considered genuine. A fount of honour is a person who held sovereignty either at or before the moment when the order was established. The ICOC considers that holding sovereignty before the founding of an order is considered effective in creation of a genuine chivalric order only if the former sovereign had not abdicated his sovereignty before the foundation of the order but, instead, had been deposed or had otherwise lost power. In the ICOC's view, some organisations create a false fons honorum in order to satisfy this requirement and give themselves apparent legitimacy; often, the founder or patron of a self-styled order has assumed a false title of nobility as well as supposed current or former sovereignty. The ICOC maintains a register of which organisations they consider to be genuine chivalric orders.

Certain organisations which may appear to have a chivalric character (such as the Augustan Society and the International Fellowship of Chivalry-Now, which state publicly that they are not chivalric orders) carefully distinguish themselves from self-styled orders of chivalry, orders legitimized by countries, and those viewed as genuine by international bodies.

After the medieval era, the exclusive right to confer nobility, titles, knighthoods and membership in Europe's state-recognized orders of chivalry was arrogated by sovereigns, exceptions being recorded in such annals as the Almanach de Gotha for dynastic orders granted by royal consorts (e.g., Order of the Starry Cross) or pretenders.

== Other characteristics ==
Self-styled orders may share certain other characteristics:

1. They long ago were suppressed by the Holy See, protector of mediaeval Western military religious orders in the Holy Land or on the Iberian Peninsula;
2. No sovereign Western state recognises them as legitimate orders of knighthood;
3. They claim to be under the high protection of or to be headed by episcopi vagantes or obscure princes;
4. They are linked closely to bearers of false titles of nobility.

== Freemasonry ==
Since the 18th century, freemasonry has incorporated symbols and rituals of several medieval military orders in a number of Masonic bodies, notably the "Red Cross of Constantine" (derived from the Sacred Military Constantinian Order of Saint George, and the Order of the Holy Sepulchre), the "Order of Malta" (derived from the Sovereign Military Order of Malta), and the "Order of the Temple" (derived from the medieval Knights Templar), the latter two featuring prominently in the York Rite of Freemasonry.

None of the masonic bodies are claiming to be orders of chivalry nor are their insignia worn in public (a right accorded orders of chivalry): hence they are not self-styled orders, but merely fraternal organisations.

== See also ==
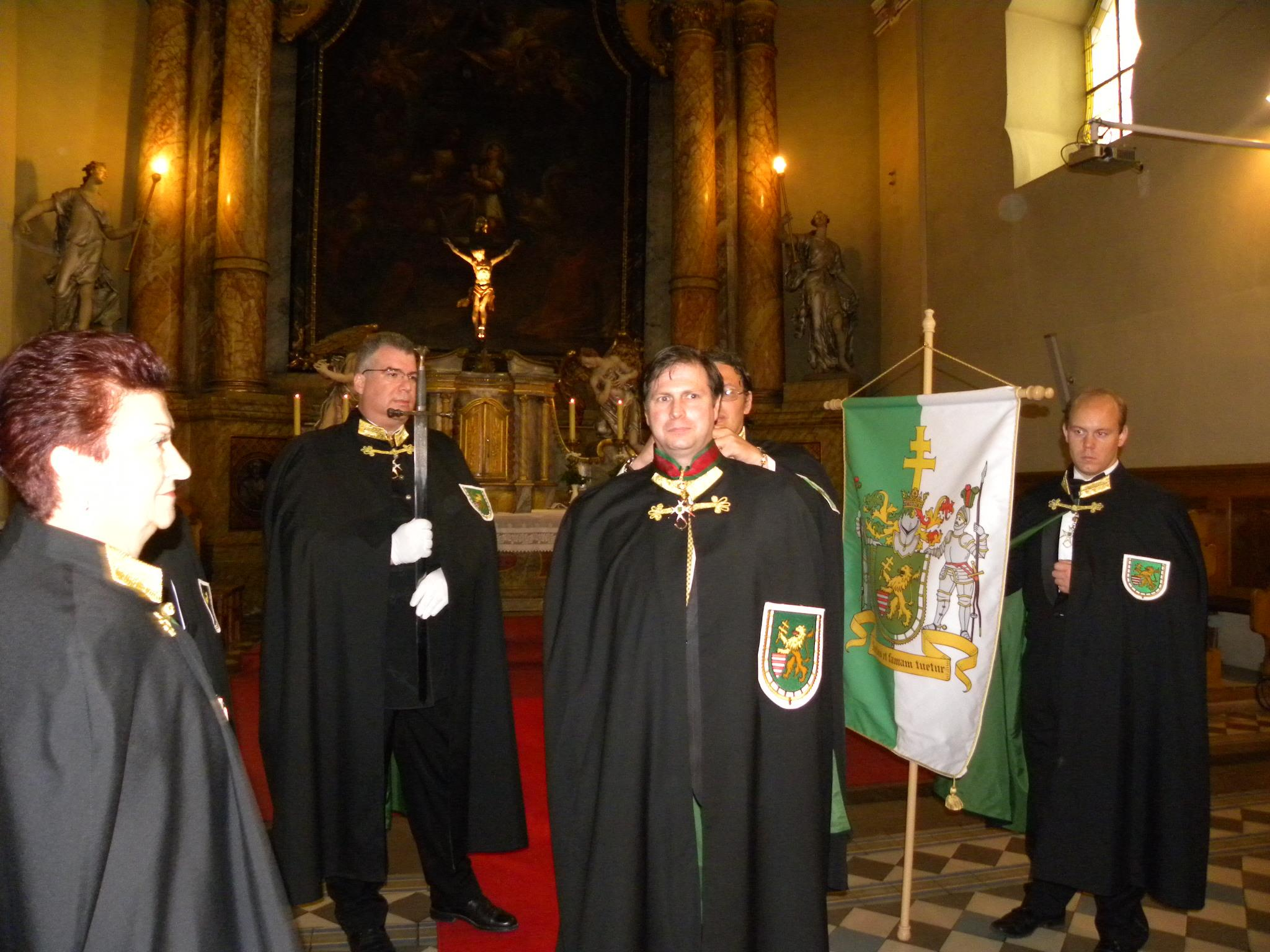
Proclamation of Sandor Habsburg as "Grandmaster of the Knights of the Golden Spur" in the Franciscan Church of Esztergom, 2012

- Hospitaller Order of Saint Lazarus of Jerusalem
- International Order of Saint Stanislaus
- Knights Hospitaller mimic orders
- Knight of the Golden Spur
- Niadh Nask
- Noble Order of Saint George of Rougemont
- Order of Saint Blaise
- Order of the Crown of Thorns
- Order of the Lion and the Black Cross
- Ordo Sancti Stanislai
- Sovereign Military and Hospitaller Order of Saint John of Jerusalem, Oecumenical Knights of Malta
- Sovereign Military Order of the Temple of Jerusalem
