= Knight of the Golden Spur (Hungary) =

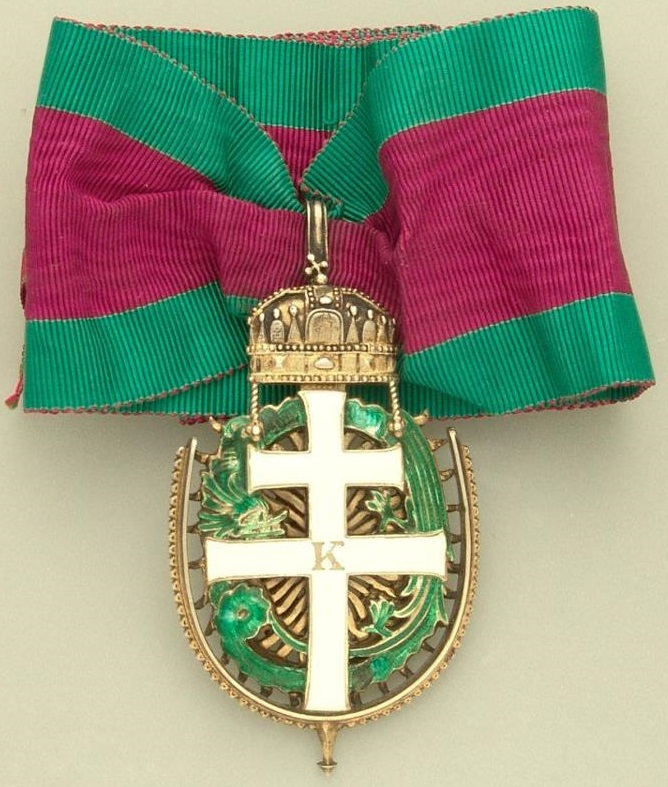
Badge of the Knight of the Golden Spur

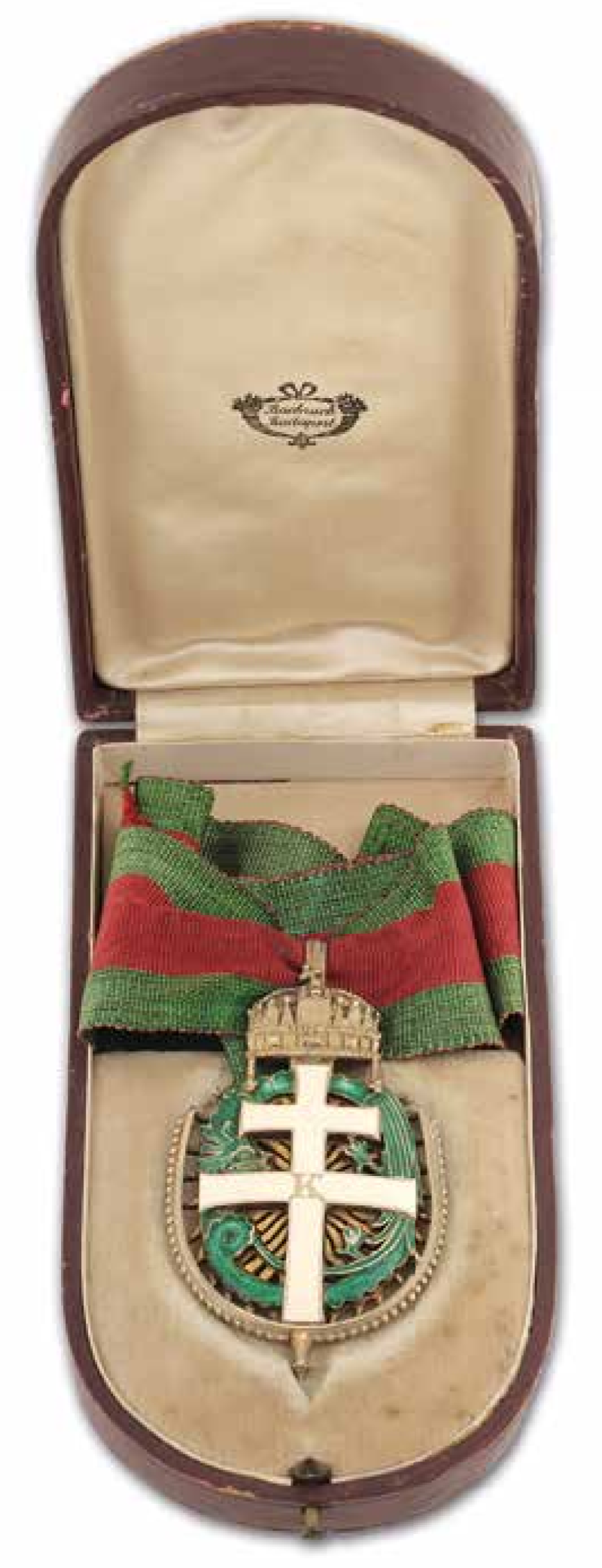
Badge of the knights of golden spur

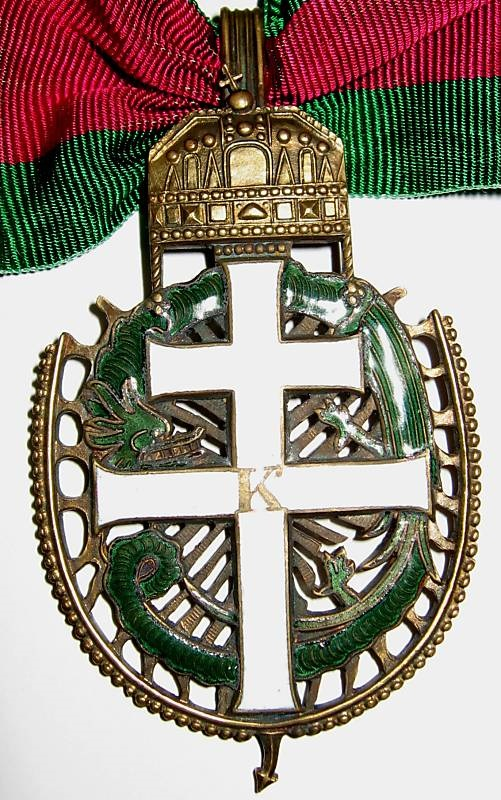
Badge, front side

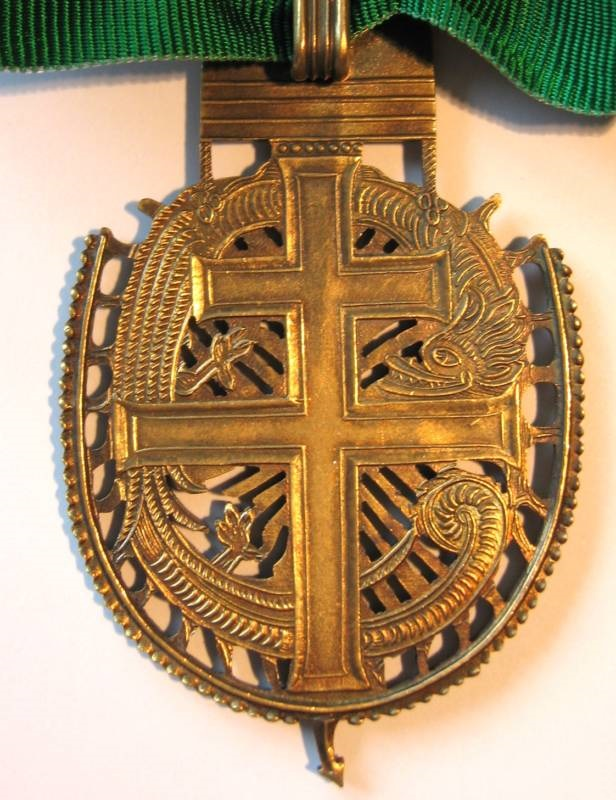
Badge, back side

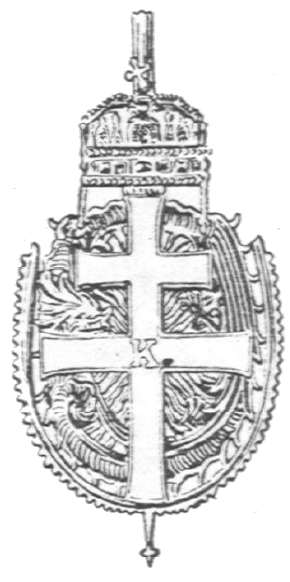
Badge 1918

Ribbon, 1918

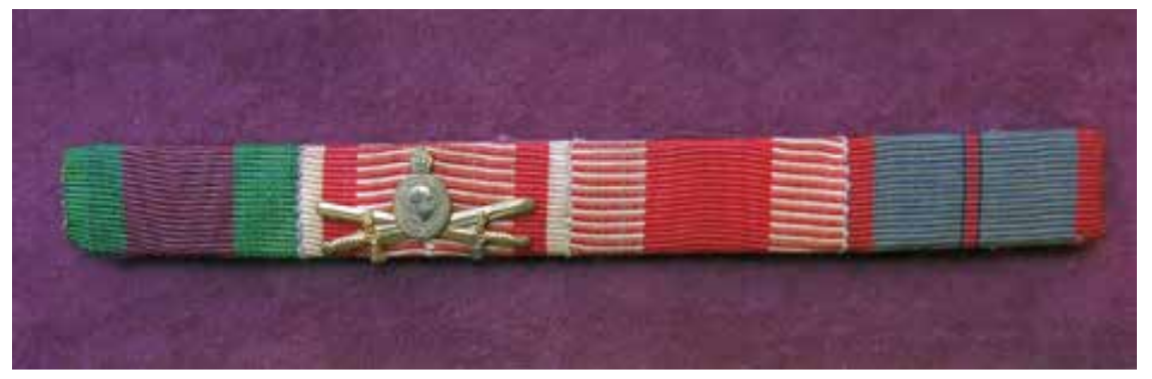
Military ribbons of Count József Cziráky, beginning with the knight of the golden spur from the left

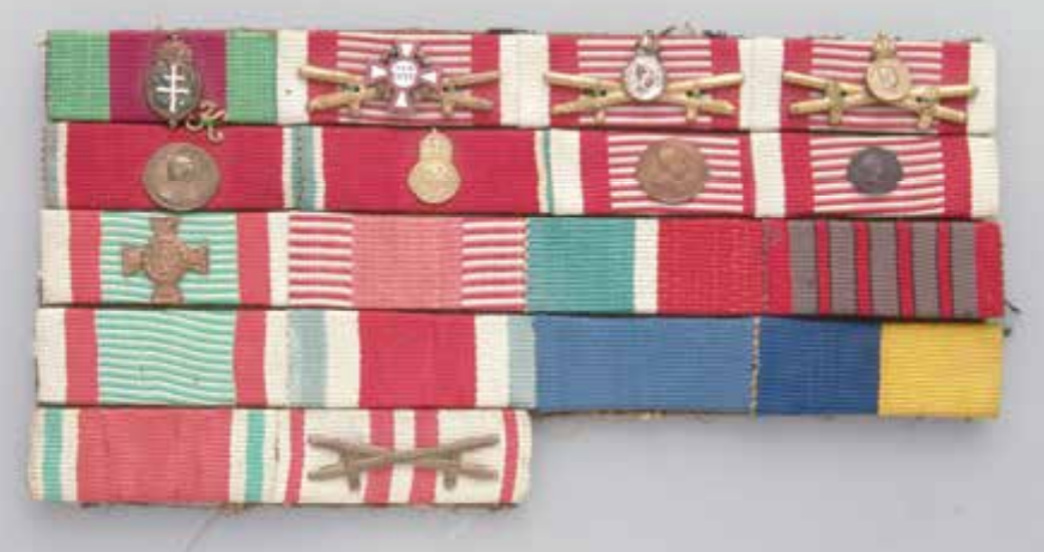
Military ribbons of Zoltán Farkas, beginning with the knight of the golden spur in the upper left corner.

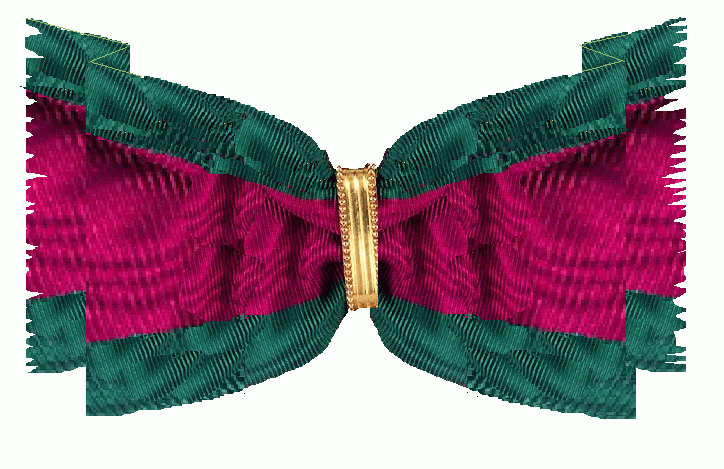
Ribbon

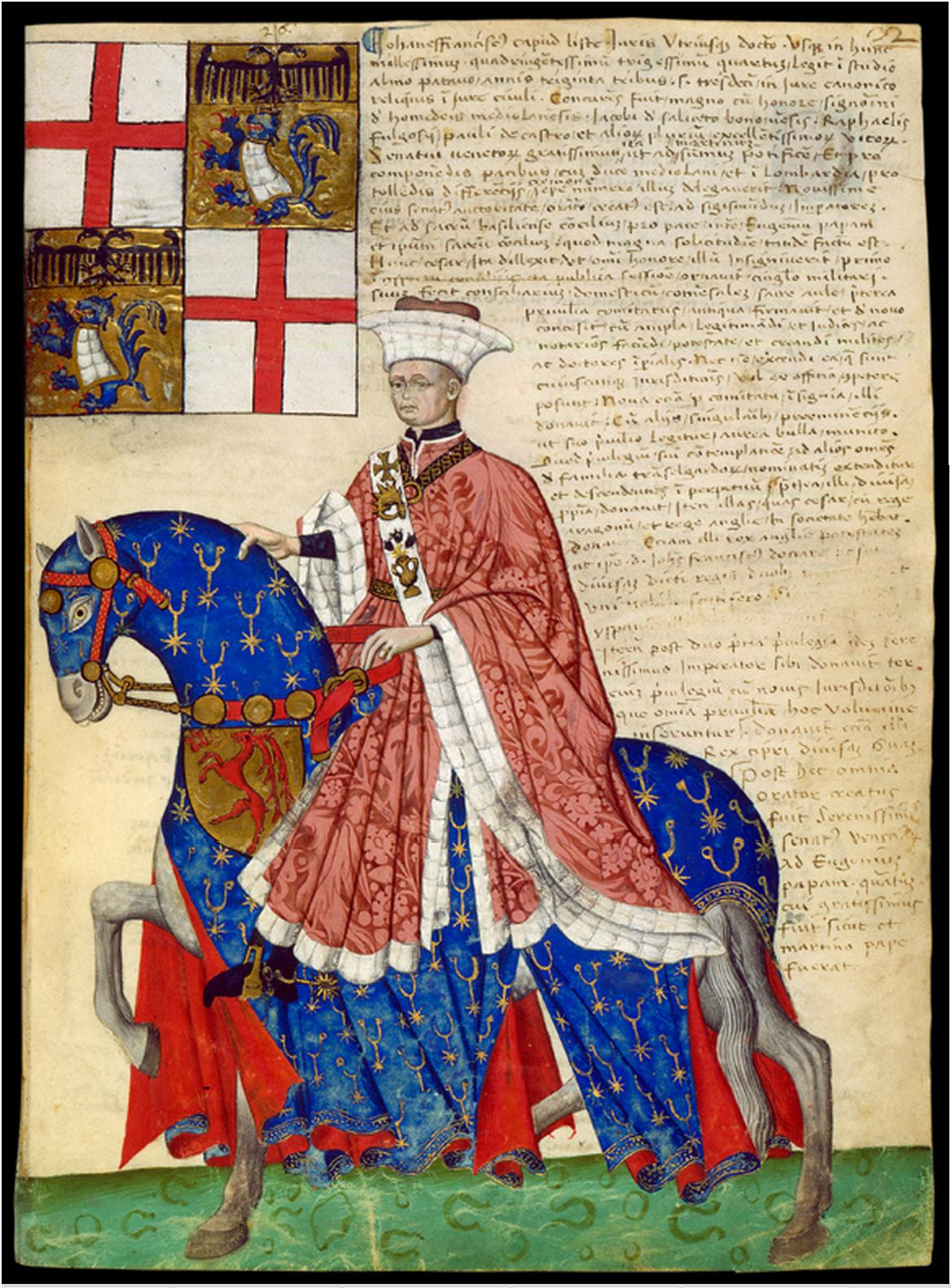
Giovanni Francesco Capodilista (between 1434 and 1440), knighted in 1434. The horse cloth is semé by golden spurs. (He also shows the badges of the Order of the Dragon, Order of the Jar, and the devise of House of Lancaster the so-called SS-chain.)

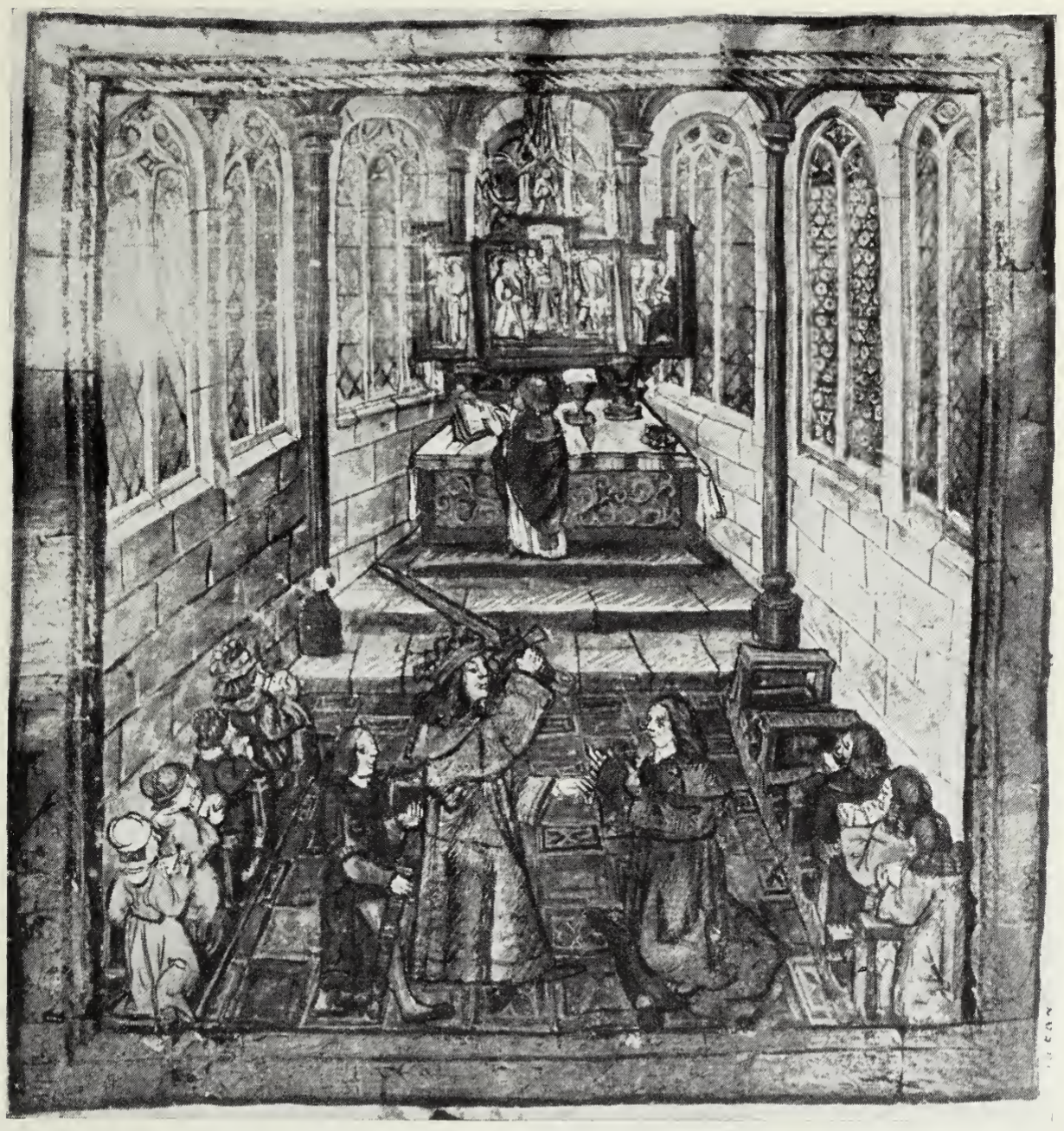
Knighting of the Swiss envoy, Melchior Russ by King Mathias Corvinus in 1488

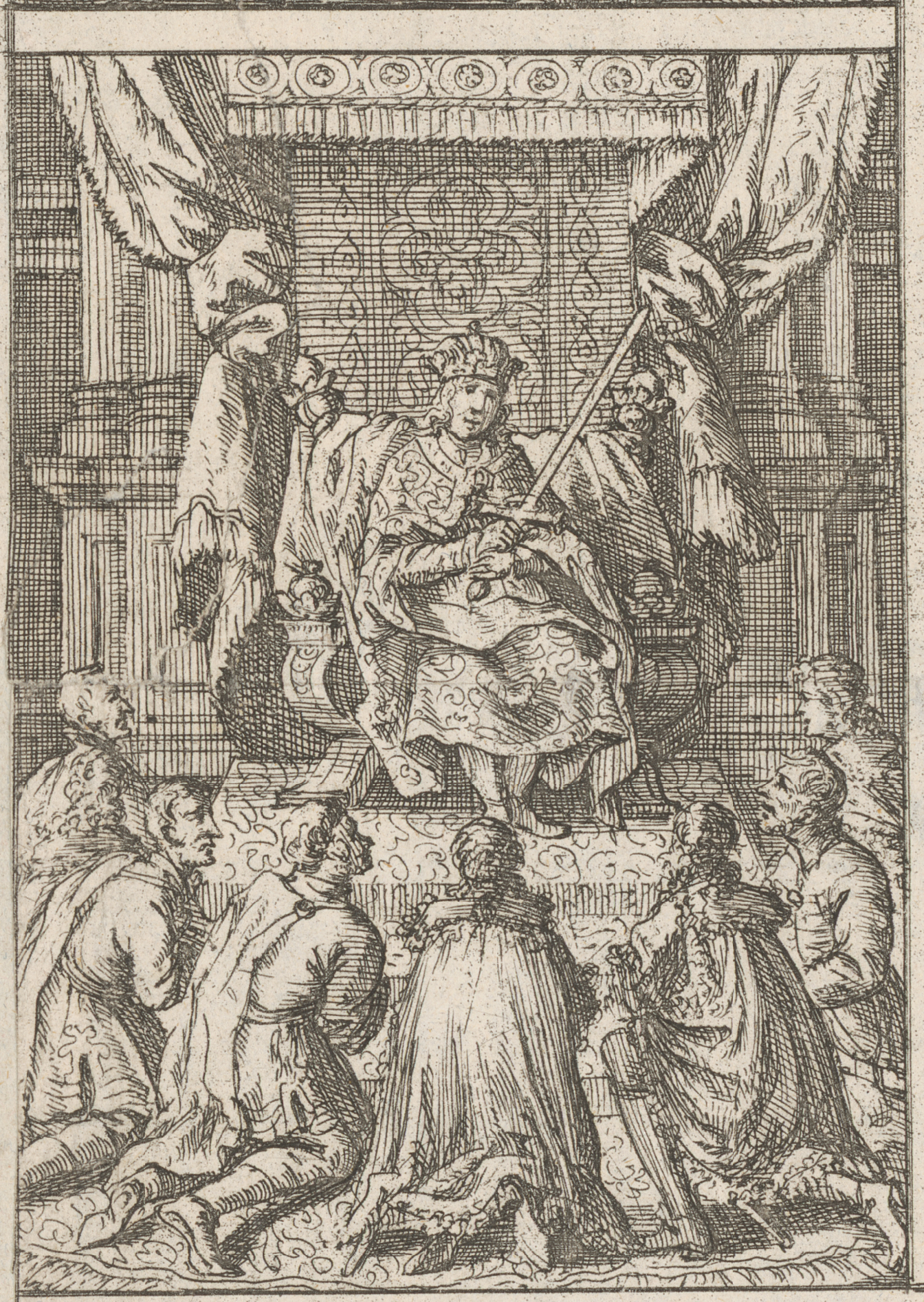
Knighting at the coronation of Joseph I, 1687

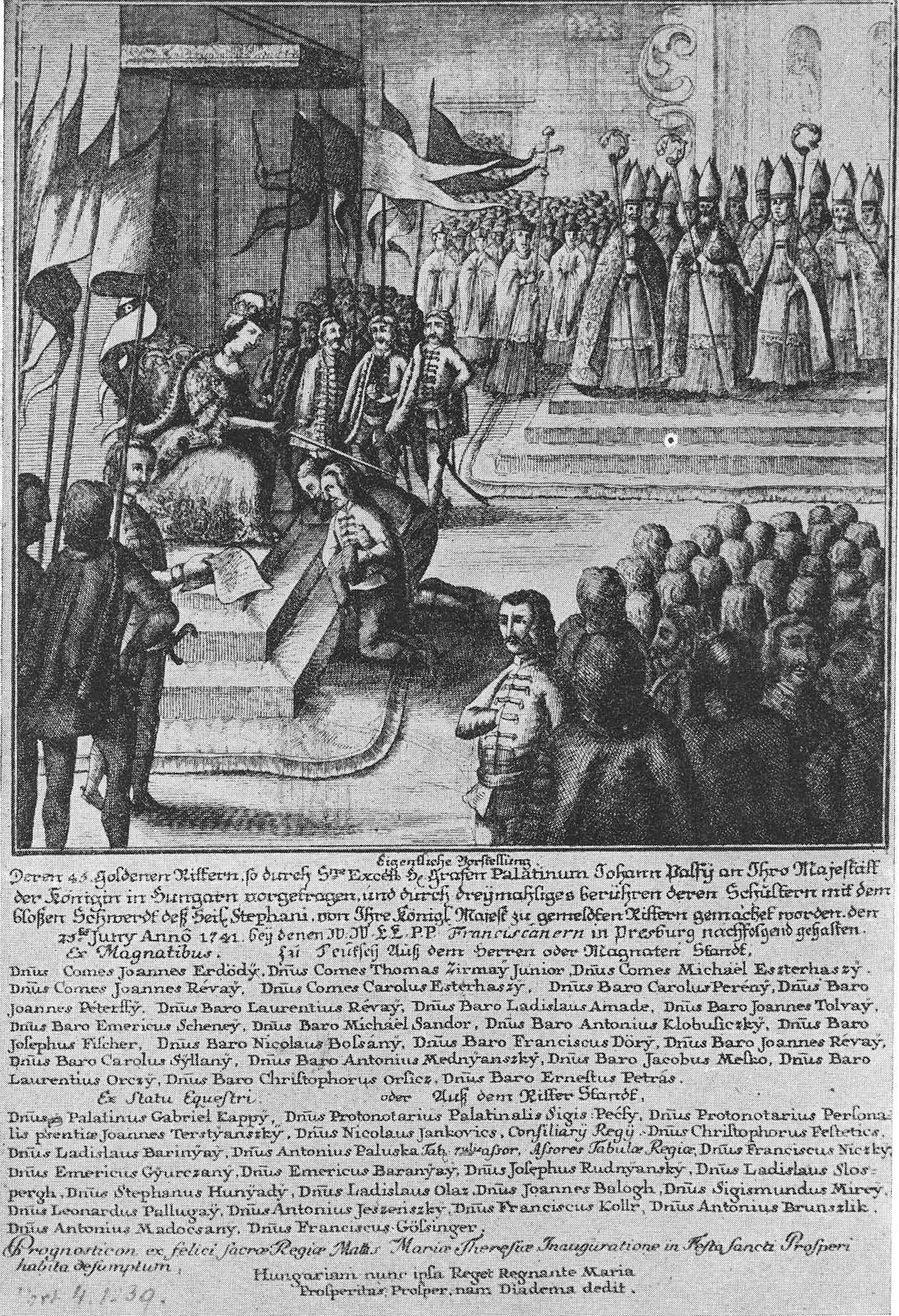
Knighting at the coronation of Maria Theresa, 1740

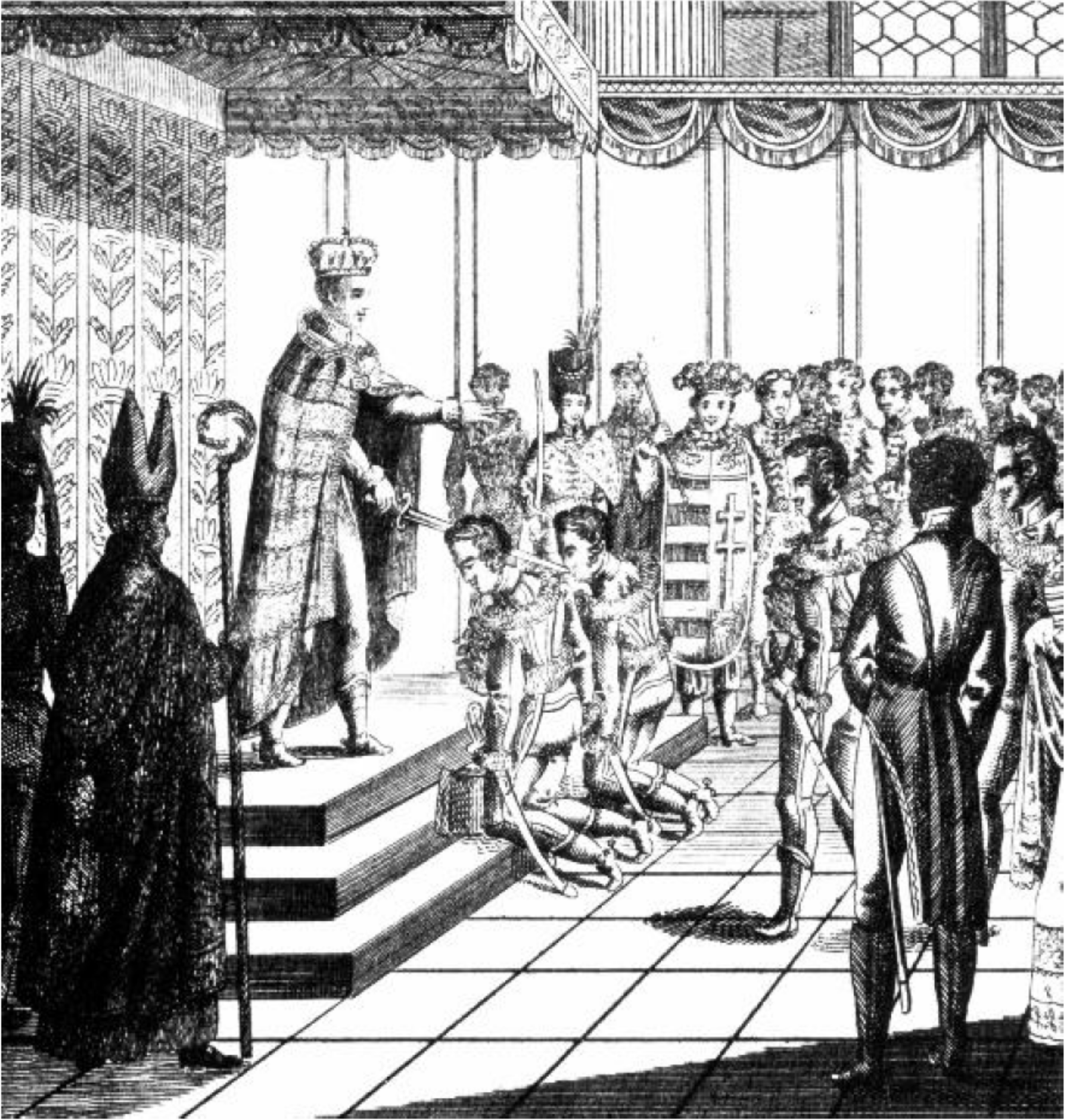
Knighting at the coronation of Ferdinand V, 1830

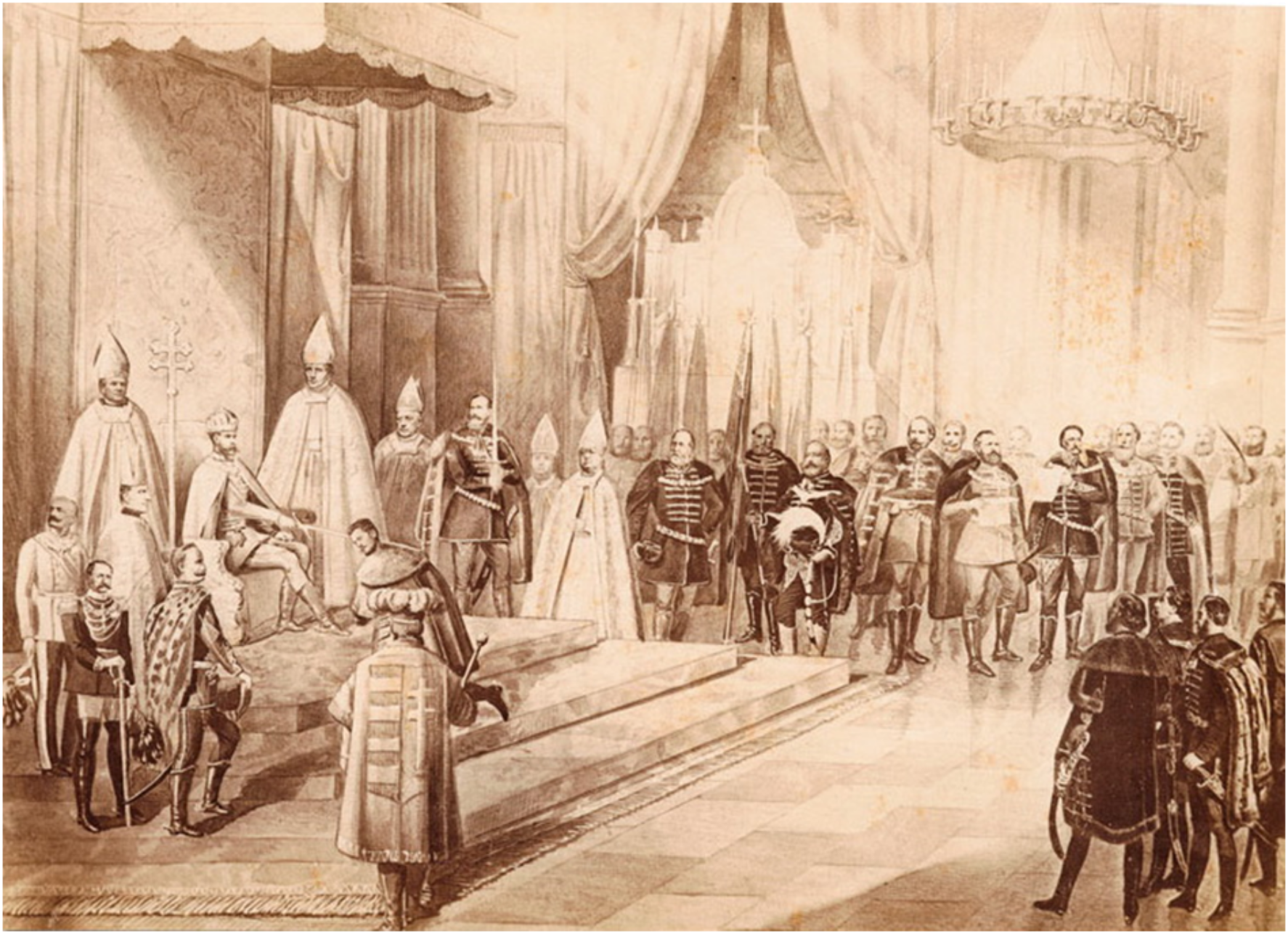
Knighting at the coronation of Franz Joseph I, 1867

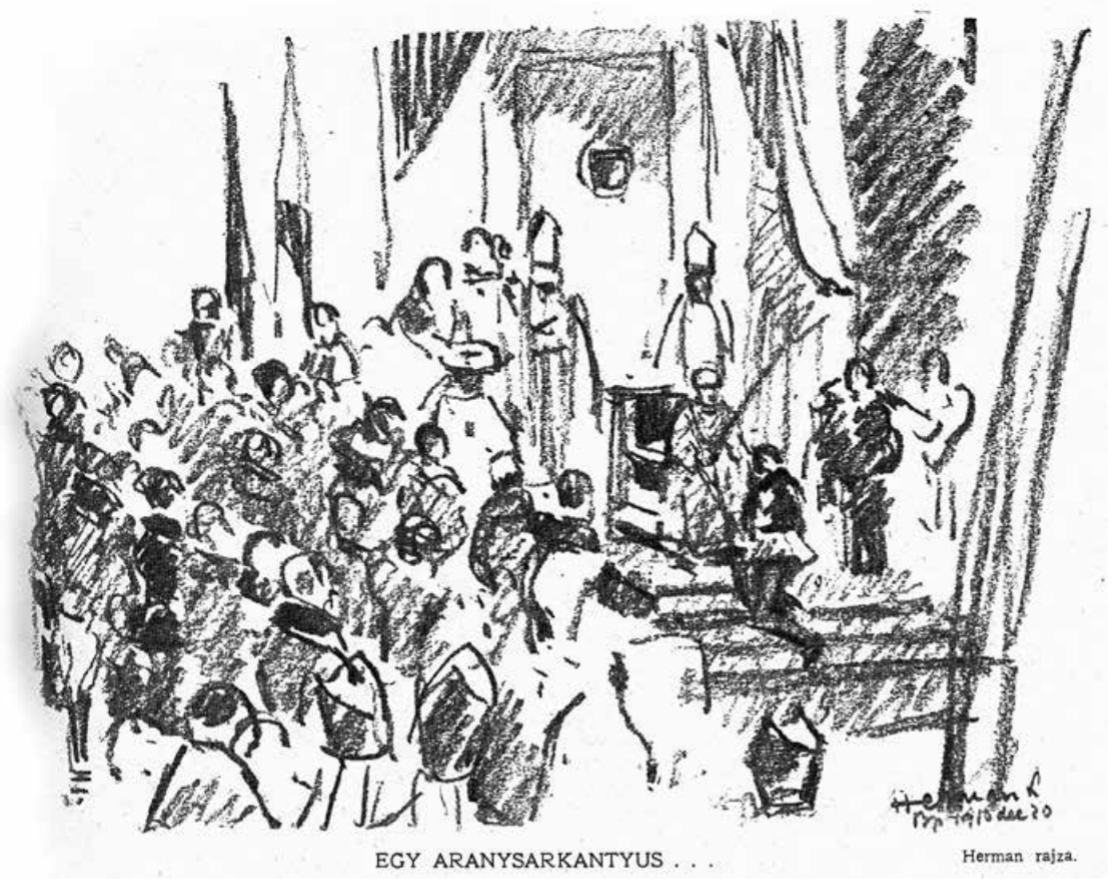
Knighting in 1916

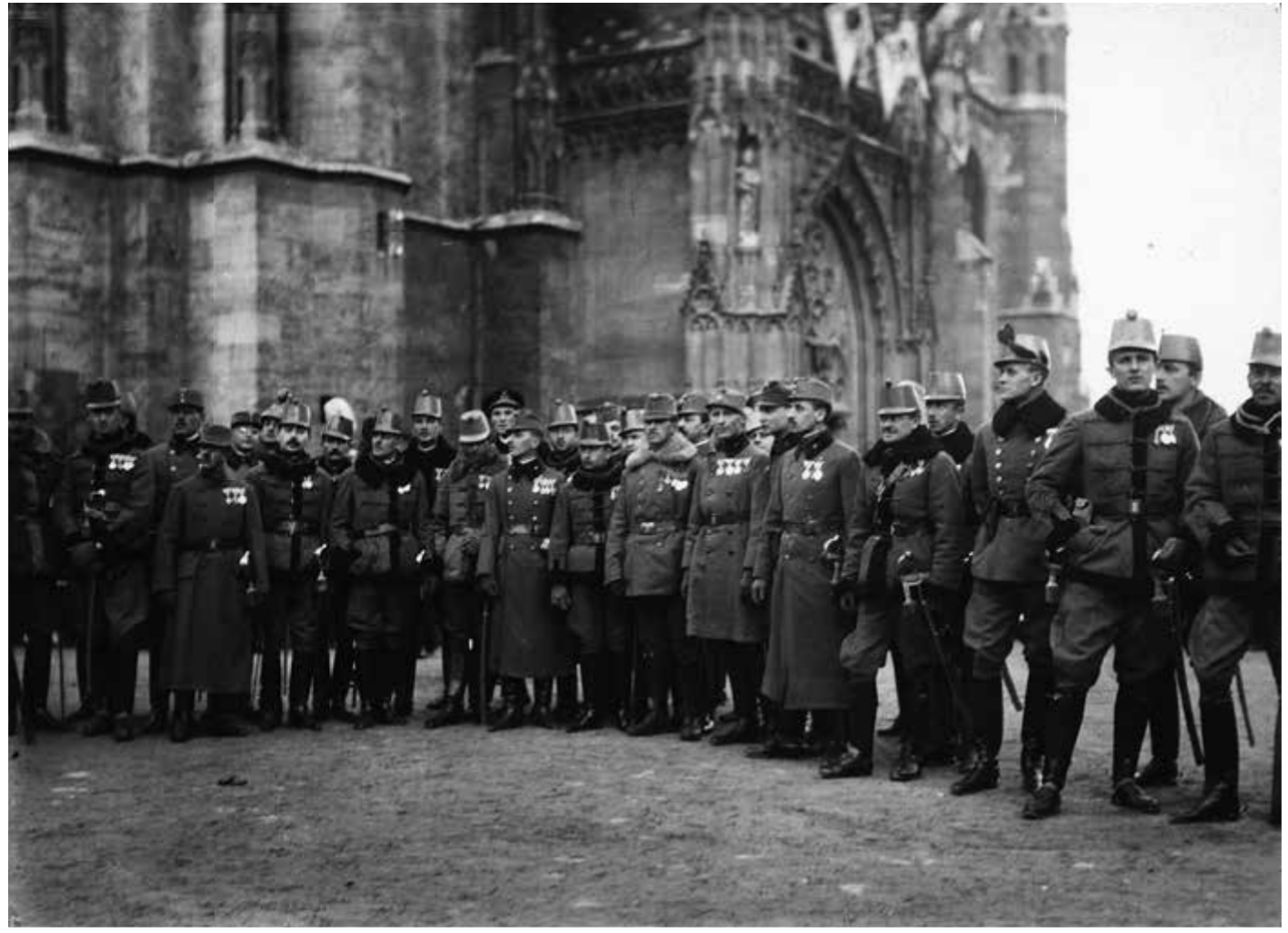
Some of the last knights of golden spur in 1916

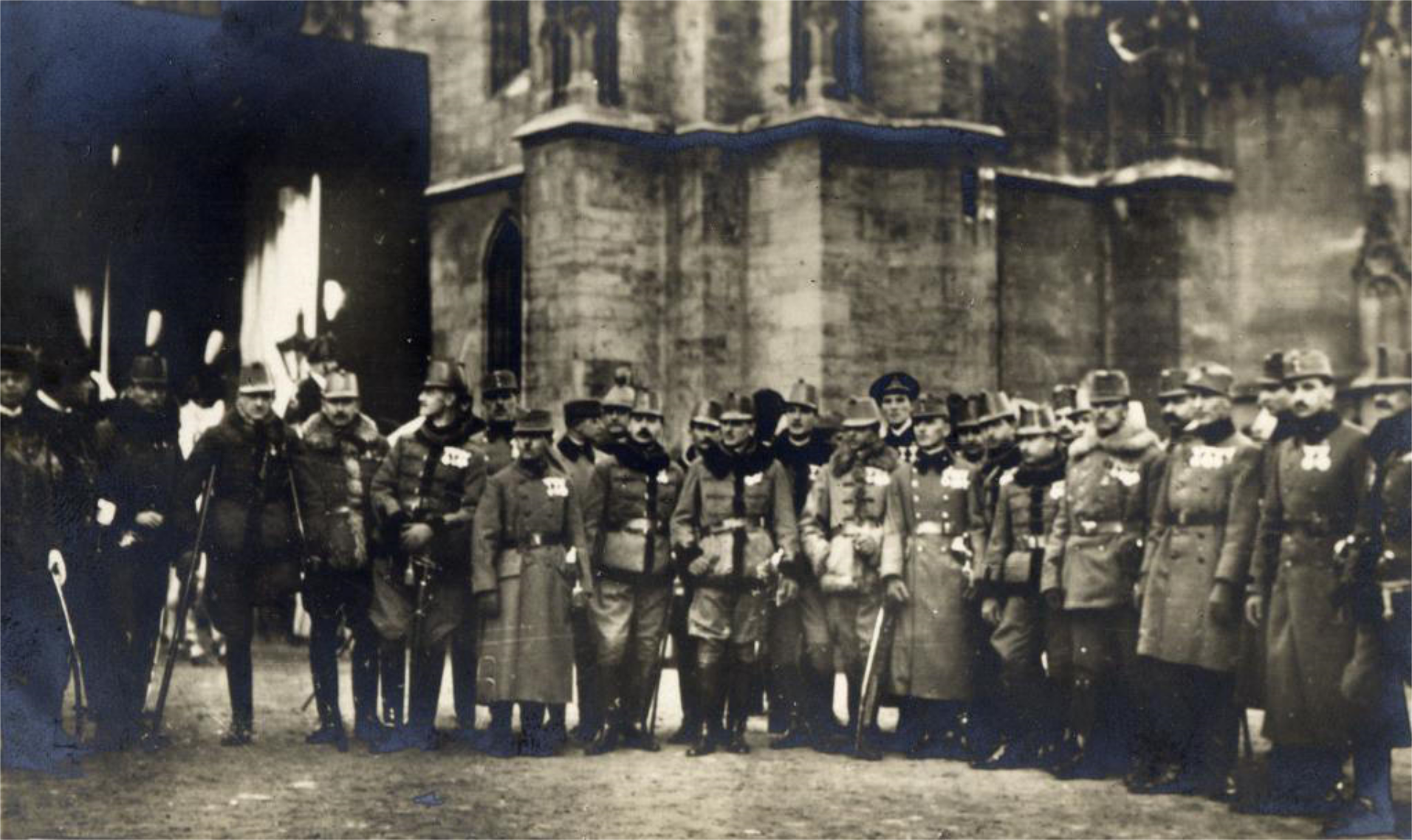
Some of the last knights of golden spur in 1916

Knights of the Golden Spur (Hungarian: Aranysarkantyús lovag; Latin: Eques auratus, or Eques aureatus) were persons knighted during the ceremony of Hungarian kings' coronations. It was not a regular knightly order, its membership did not result in any special privileges or duties. The knightly title was not hereditary, it was given only for a personal use. However, the knights were authorized, to wear real golden spurs, attached to their boots at the ceremony, and they also wore a small golden spur on their hats.

== Insignia ==
They did not have any regular insignia, though it had been claimed several times. On 21 April 1918 Charles IV of Hungary created a decorative medal for them as a memorial insignia to his 30 December 1916 coronation in Budapest.

The preparations for the design begun in 1917, by Joseph Hoffmann, a professor from Vienna. The first proposal was submitted to Baron Rhemen, who was responsible for the issue in June 1917, and a compromise agreement was reached in December. Rhemen ordered to supplement the badge with olive branches, but they were omitted in the final version. The minutes of the 35th session of the Council of Ministers of 26 October 1917 inform us, that badges have already been completed. The statute of Charles IV about the decorative medal of knights of the golden spur was finally issued on 21 April 1918. Accordingly, the decorative medal had to be worn in the neck, on the ribbon of the Order of Saint Stephen. The hand written royal decree of 10 April 1918 allows that the decorative medal may be retained, and passed over to the heirs of the bearer as a gift. Later on, the Hungarian Prime Minister Sándor Wekerle was authorized to handled the affairs of the knights.

From the 12–13 December 1917 correspondence of Count Otokar Czernin, Minister in the personal service of the ruler, and the Minister of Foreign Affairs, and Count Aladár Zichy, the Minister in the personal service of the King, we know the decision, how the bearers of the decorative medal have to wear the badge: "... it seems reasonable to determine precisely, that this emblem can only be worn in its original size, in the neck, and any other ways, like wearing it on the bosom or in the form of a knob made of ribbons, should be avoided under all circumstances." The ministerial summary also emphasizes that, despite its ornate design, the badge hasn't been regarded as a badge of an order, but rather as a wearable memorial item.

The medal from the front side shows a white enameled double cross, with the letter K (Károly) in the middle. Above the cross was placed the Holy Crown of Hungary, and the cross is surrounded by a green enameled dragon, symbolizing the Order of the Dragon. The dragon and the cross are by three quarters surrounded by an ornate golden spur. The height of the memorial sign is 67 mm, the width is 44 mm. It was worn on the red ribbon (wide 40–50 mm or more), lined by green (the ribbon of Order of Saint Stephen of Hungary). On the back side of the medal, only the dragon was worked up in detail. At that time, gold and silver honors began to be replaced by bronze and zinc, and only the highest orders were made from precious metals.

The Bachruch company in Budapest has been entrusted with the production of the decorative medals. Despite the approval of April 1918 and the finished production of the badges by the end of 1917, the distribution still has not been made. According to a letter of 23 October 1918, the Bachruch company indicated that because of the blockade on silkware they can not deliver the badges. On 13 November 1918 they sent another negative answer regarding the acquisition of ribbons, although the badge was the same as the neck-ribbon of the middle cross of the long existing Royal Hungarian Order of Saint Stephen. All this perfectly reflects the extent of the lack of raw materials (and the negative effects of accumulation of goods) at the end of the World War. Finally, the knights got their badges only since February 1920. (Meantime the main events were the end of the world war, the end of the Austro-Hungarian Empire, the rise and end of the Hungarian Soviet Republic, the Treaty of Trianon, and the beginning of the new Kingdom of Hungary.)

== The history of the order ==
The sources mention the first Hungarian knights of golden spur during the coronation of Hungarian Angevin rulers, but they also indicated that this was part of the ceremony already at the time of the Arpadian kings. In 1790, the Hungarian jurist Adalbert Barics believed that they were perhaps servants of king St. Stephen, and were obliged to fight with him in the battles; or the first knights might be ordered by king St. Ladislaus to assist at the reburial of St. Stephen in 1083. According to Barics, the knights were entitled to wear golden spurs, and perhaps golden armour. They also were the only persons to enter the royal court with golden horse trappings, and for some patriotic services they had to be rewarded with two times of the value of nobles' reward. If the nobles, for example, received a gold chain worth of two hundred florins, the knights of golden spur had to be donated with a gold chain worth of four hundred florins. (It is possible that the privileges of Charles I of Hungary from 1327 to magister Doncs also belong to the tradition of the Knights of the Golden Spur. He was entitled to change the Argent parts of his coat of arms, crest and banner to Or, but only in case, if he takes part in the war by the King's side. When Charles I of Hungary died (16 July 1342), three mounted knights were set guard in front of the gates of the Buda church, to personalize the king. According to the Chronicon Pictum of Márk Kálti: "One of the gallants was adorned with a tournament dress suitable for the royal dignity, the next with a dress suitable for the spear-struggle, and the third wore the royal majesty's battle-armory... The gallants ... wore golden helmets and their crest was an ostrich [head with horseshoe in the beak]: as like as the gallant king used to wear and use them in his life. ...all these were the king's belongings during his life." According to the description, the king had a special armory for the "tornamentum"s and the "hastiludium"s, suitable for two different types of tournaments.)

The spurs were always seen as symbols of the knighthood, and some of them wore nicely ornate pieces. Representative spurs could also be made of gold. The knightly rank was mostly expressed by a golden spur. The saying "earning the spurs" also suggests that the right to wear a spur was identical with the acquisition of a knightly rank. During the 1343 Rome pilgrimage of Queen Elizabeth, the mother of king Louis the Great, her cortege was made of fifty knights of golden spur. In 1396, King Sigismund created Resti, the admiral of the Hungarian navy knight of the golden spur, in the city of Ragusa. He was given gold spurs, and gold chain. It happened at Christmas Day, when King Sigismund was presented with a piece from the Savior's sponge by the Ragusan city council. As the sign of his gratitude, the king created the town's rector (and the admiral of the Hungarian navy), Marino Resti knight of the golden spur, and ordered that this piece should always be passed over to Resti's office successors.

On 26 September 1412 Bertholo de Orsini has been taken into the Order of the Dragon, when at his request he was also allowed to see the order's original founding charter in Buda. At the same time, King Sigismund made him his counsellor (consiliariorum et athletarum nostrorum), created him knight of the golden spur (cingulo militis seu militaris preheminentie decore presentialiter adornamus, facientes tibi insignia militie et presertim calcar deauratum ad calcem sinistri pedis tui per nobilem Stephanum de Rozgon aule nostre regalis militem et de dicta societate socialem more et observantia debita in talibus et consueta coram cunctis astantibus apponi et aligari, preserving him the possibility, that – when he'll put on aureas imperatorias infulas in urbe Romana – he can put a spur on his another leg as well), furthermore, he was also belted with a sword (gladio ancipiti seu ense, cum nos bellum insigne committemus, te nobis astante statuentes expresse et hoc regio decernentes edicto).

On 31 May 1433 Emperor Sigismund created after his coronation in Rome, at Bridge of Hadrian a great number of new knights. Some sources indicate that they were more than 200. (If we take into consideration the symbolic year 256, their number might be exactly the same, as like as at the 1452 coronation of Frederick III.) Numerous new knights were also granted Order of the Dragon.

Some coat of arms miniatures of Giovanni Francesco Capodilista also show crest and horse cloth semy of golden spurs (along with other insignia on his clothing, and his neck: Order of the Dragon, Order of the Jar, the devise of House of Lancaster the so-called SS-chain). The Capodilista arms was granted in 1434 by emperor Sigismund in Basel, and at the same time he was raised for the knight of golden spur (maybe also granted with the Order of Dragon), appointed as a royal counselor, and granted the title of Pfalzgraf.

The baby king Ladislaus V was knighted in 1440 by Miklós Újlaki, voivode of Transylvania before his coronation. The new knights were also created by him. King Matthias made new knights not only during his coronation, but also on some festive occasions. On 24 June 1488 in Vienna (under Hungarian occupation that time) the Swiss Envoy Melchior Russ was knighted, in the presence of the courtiers and ten foreign ambassadors. He awarded the Order of the Dragon to the higher ranked persons, and also gave them fashionable golden spurs. According to a report of the Swiss ambassador Schilling, there were only 12 such knights throughout Hungary. These persons were not members of a knightly order but the personal knights of the king.

During the 15th century, creation of new knights of golden spur became regular. In some cases it happened even independently of coronation. On 28 February 1514 György Dózsa was knighted for a winning duel fought in the area of Nándorfehérvár, against the Ali of Epeiros, the leader of the mounted sipahis of Szendrő. As a reward, king Louis II granted him with a double service pay, golden chain, purple dress richly embroidered with gold, spur and sword. Furthermore, he also gained 200 gold florins, a village between Nándorfehérvár and Temesvár. Finally, he was entitled to augment his family coat of arms with Ali's cut off arm, as a reminder to his heroic deeds. In 1522, István Bárdi became knight in a similar way. That year, the Hungarians sought a victory against the Turkish leader Ferhates. They also captured several higher and lower ranked officers, and sent various war insignia for the king to Buda. The good news was brought to the king by Bárdi, who also showed great courage in the battle. As a reward, king Louis II remunerated him with a silvery-scabbarded sword, a gold necklace, a pair of gold spurs, and made him knight of the golden spur in presence of several high ranked noble gentlemen.

In the beginning, it was not stated in advance who will be knighted during the coronation. In 1563, at the coronation of king Maximilian I some nobles were knighted who fought successfully in Turkish wars, like György Thury, Antal Székely, László Gyulaffy and Miklós Hennyey. However, there also appeared a lot of people who were unworthy of honoring this title, but simply jostled themselves forward during the coronation, so the knighting ceremony had to be abandoned. For this reason, in later times the palatine (the military leader of the country) was entitled to choose the candidates for knighting. In 1598, Archduke Matthias made knights of golden spur Ferenc Nádasdy and Miklós Pálffy in Győr, newly recaptured from the Turks. New knights were made in 1608, during the coronation of Matthias II.

The first statute was the 1609:73 which mentions those young nobles whom the Hungarian king used to knight after the coronation. At that time, King Matthias II obliged the new knights to pay a contribution of 12 golden florins. In 1687, Joseph, the 9 years old son of Leopold I was crowned for the king of Hungary. Since he was still a young boy, he could not create new knights. For this reason, Leopold I made him the Knight of the Order of the Golden Fleece first, and let him swore their oath, and so in the knightly sense, he now had the right to make new knights of the golden spur. For a long time, the coronation of Hungarian kings, and the new knightings took place in the Franciscan church of Pressburg, the then capital city of Hungary. Over the time, most of the knights came from the prominent families of Hungary, but almost all the social strata participated in knightings.

According to the Hungarian jurist Ignác Kassics, in 1691 king Leopold I knighted his favorite court servant, a certain Hannibal Dascoli, but this time the primarily personal title was given to his male descendants, as well, as a reward for the military merits made by him and his ancestors. At the same time, he was given the ornaments of the order: belts, necklaces, rings, spurs, other ornaments of the order, and a special diploma of knightment. In 1840, Kassics also describes the insignia of the order, (probably referring back to the 1742 book of József Pintér: a cross-shaped golden "decorative medal" hanging from the gold necklace. In the middle of the cross was placed the shield of Hungary, besides a lion is standing edgewise, and above is the Holy Crown of Hungary floating. According to Kassics, in his times, the knights were also privileged, not to put off their swords when taking an oath.

Still another description says, they had a "coat of arms" in the shape of a four-pronged gold spur [rather a cross], with a similar, but much smaller, gold spur, hanging down from one of the bigger ones [one of the cross' pronges]. The source of this description was the book by Sámuel Decsy (1742–1816), titled A magyar szent koronának és az ahoz tartozó tárgyaknak historiája (Vienna, 1792. paragraph 367), but it is just a reference to Pintér. According to Decsy, the history of the knights of golden spur earlier was described by János Decsi (Cimor) (c. 1560–1601), under the name of Baronius. However, this badge may refer to the papal knights of golden spur, because Baronius thought, the Hungarian knights of golden spur may originate from the papal order, as well. (Compare to the figure of Pintér from the year "265".)

It seems that in the later times the badges of the knights were forgotten, because in 1792 Count Antal Cziráky (who was himself eques auratus in 1790) petitioned the court to create wearable insignia for the knights. He proposed a badge (p. 30) in the form of an eight edged Maltese cross hanging from a neck-ribbon. However, despite the repeated requests, the claim was never met, neither by Leopold II nor by his successors. Cziráky also stated, the spurs to be seen on the tombstone of prince Lőrinc Újlaki (1459/60-1524) were the original badges of knights of the golden spur. (The spurs at the tombstone of his father, Miklós Újlaki [1410 k.-1477], king of Bosnia are even more characteristic. He wears spurs unstrapped from his ankles, superimposed to the feet-armours.)

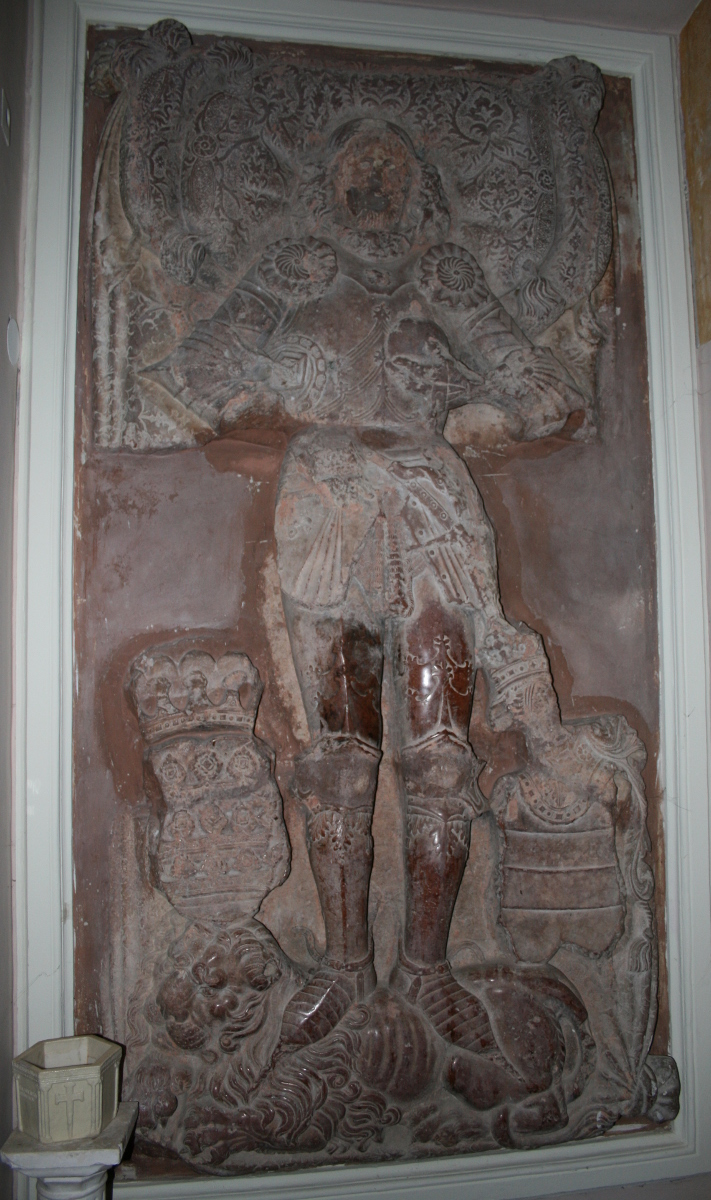
Tombstone of king Miklós Újlaki

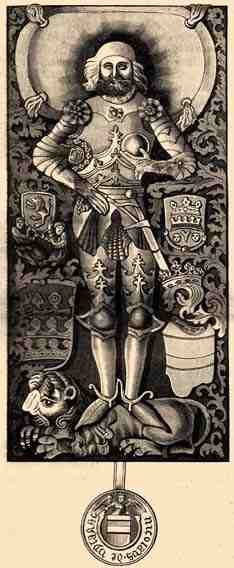
Tombstone and seal of king Miklós Újlaki

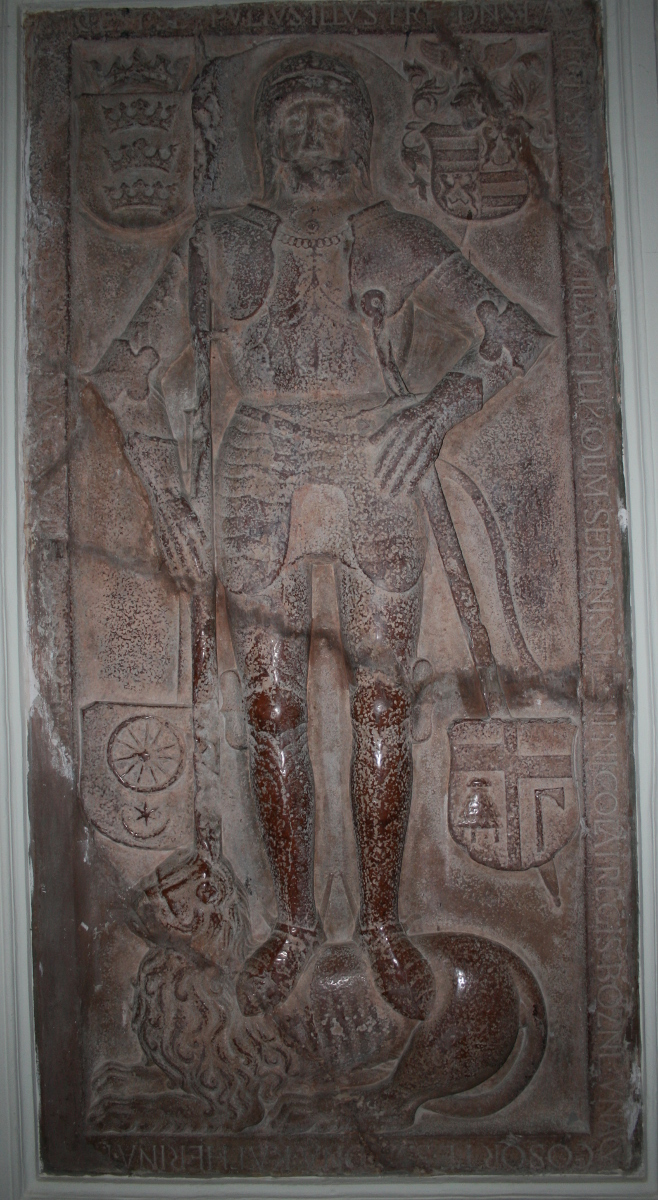
Tombstone of prince Lőrinc Újlaki

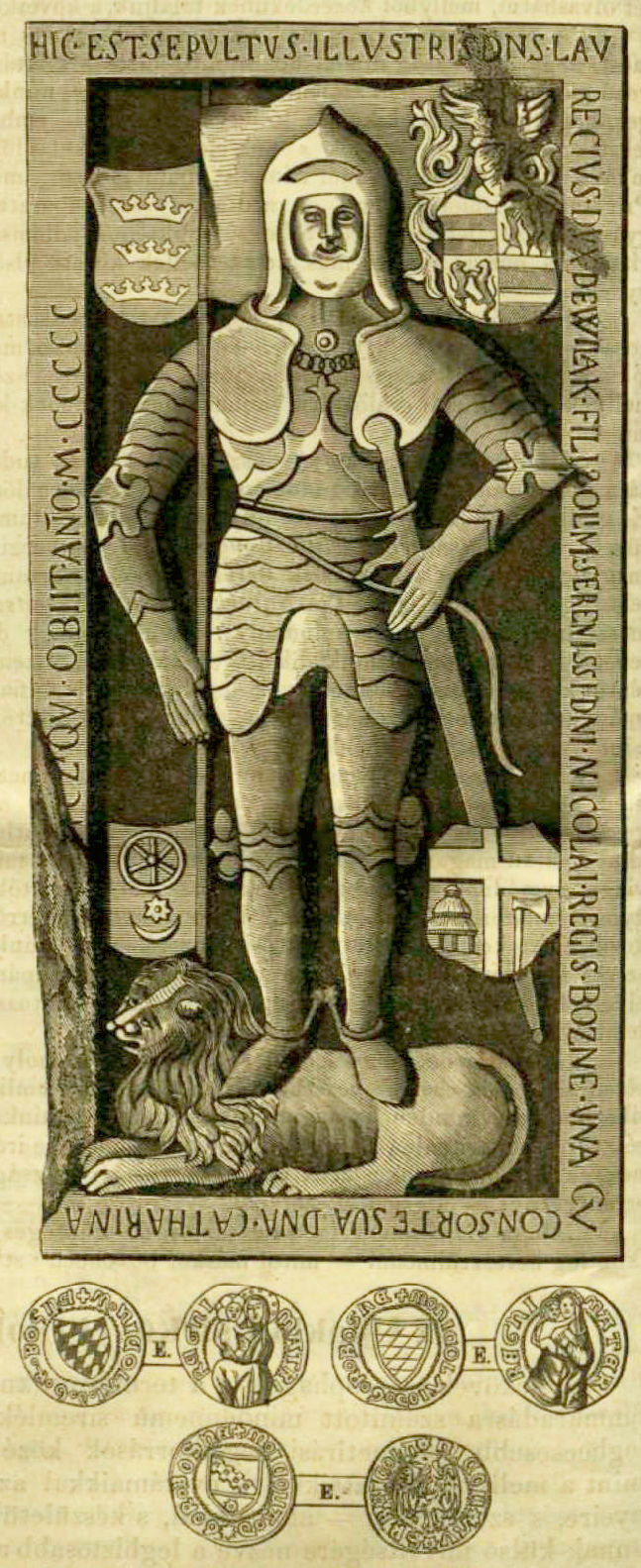
Tombstone and coins of prince Lőrinc Újlaki

Persons to be knighted were proposed by the palatine, and later on, from the end of the 19th century by the Prime Minister. The number of the knights was different on each coronation. Albert I knighted 84 persons, Charles III 6, Maria Theresa 44 (25 nobles and 19 citizens), Leopold II 33, Francis II 48, Ferdinand I 27, Franz Joseph I 28, Charles IV. 47. In the latter coronation, all the knights came from the battlefield soldiers. Half of them originated from old noble families, and there were also soldiers from various military corps. The soldiers were allowed to left the front or the hospital facilities to participate the coronation. Originally, 51 persons received invitations, but only 47 of them arrived to the coronation in time. The intention was to raise those soldiers for knights of golden spur who already were given war medals for their valiant conduct against the enemy. They got their imaginary honors to their battlefield-gray uniforms.

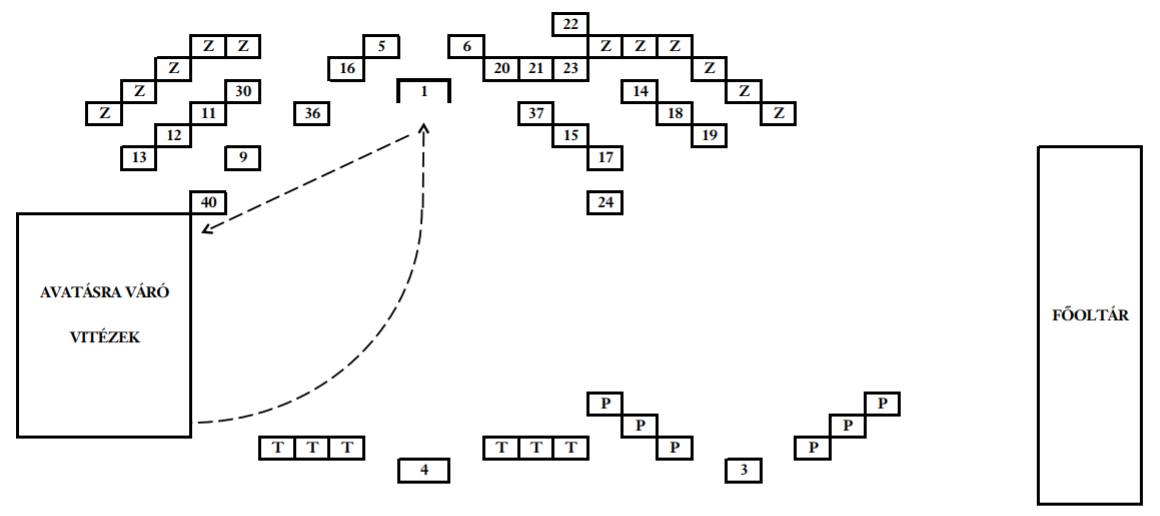
The disposition of knights in relation to the royal throne, in the church of Budapest, during the 1916 coronation ceremony

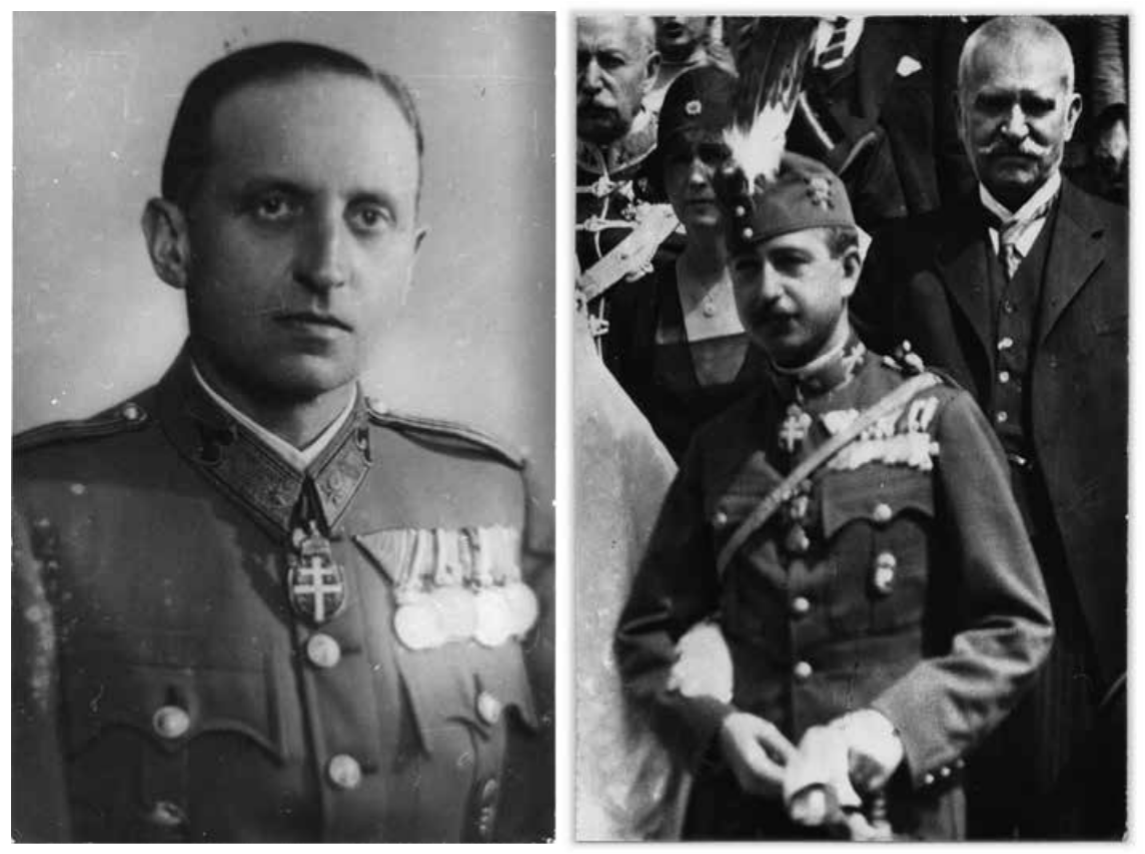
István Badics and István Damaszkin

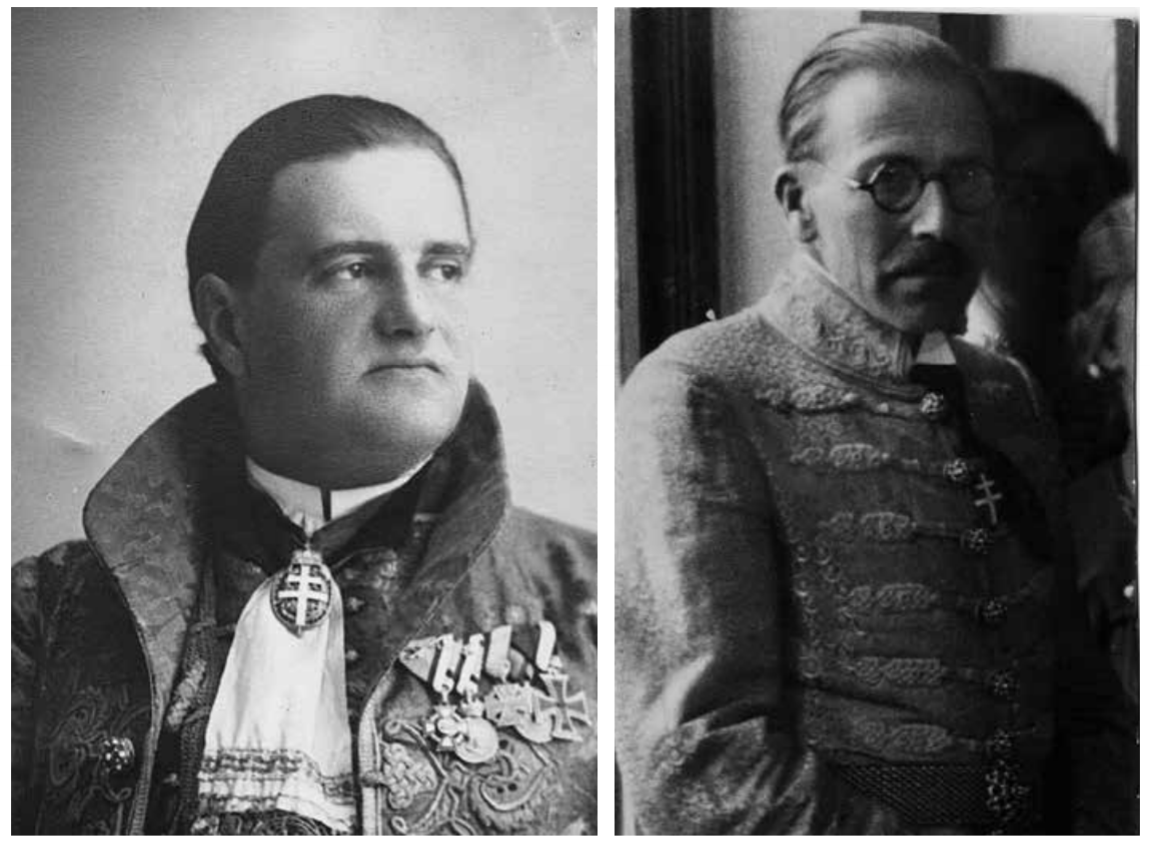
Baron István Roszner and Count György Széchenyi

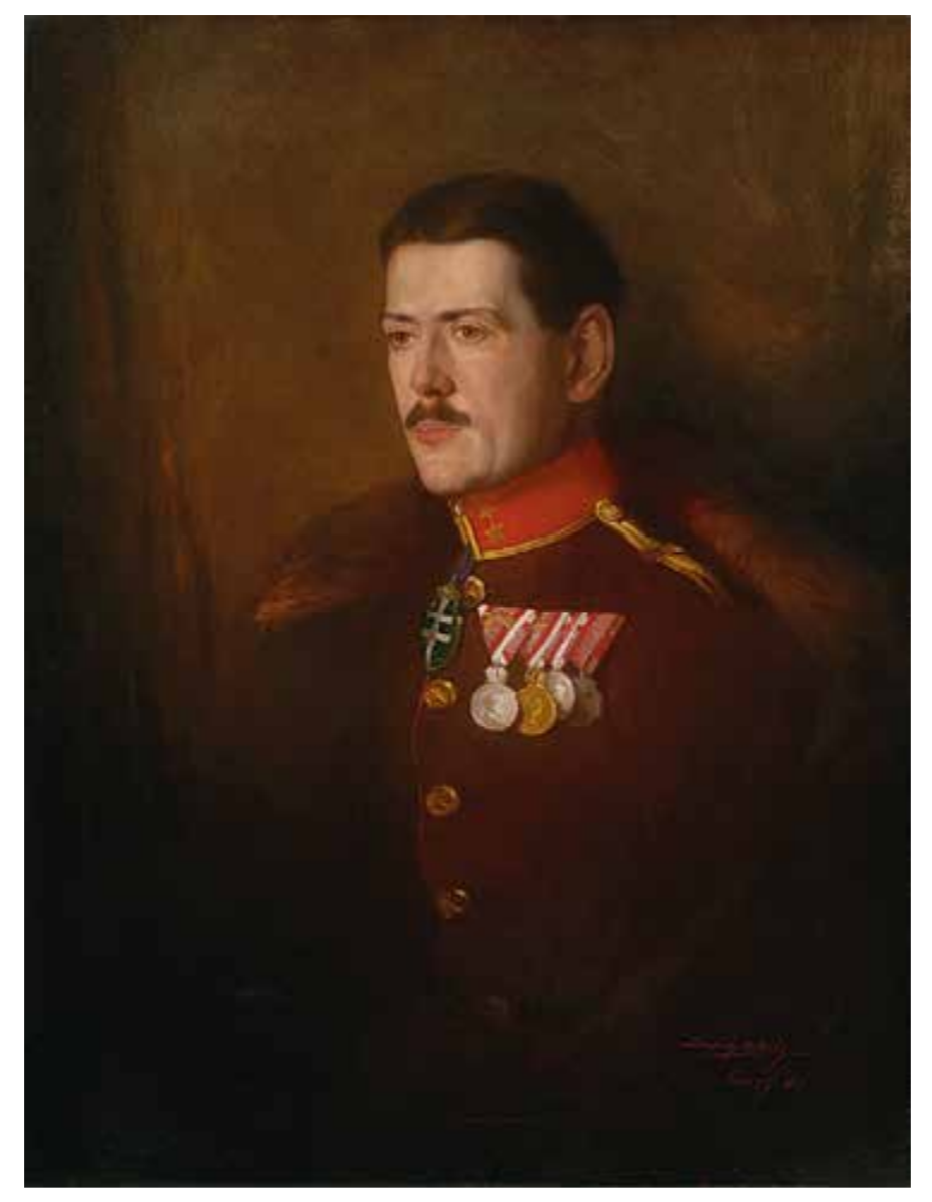
Bertalan Szepesházy

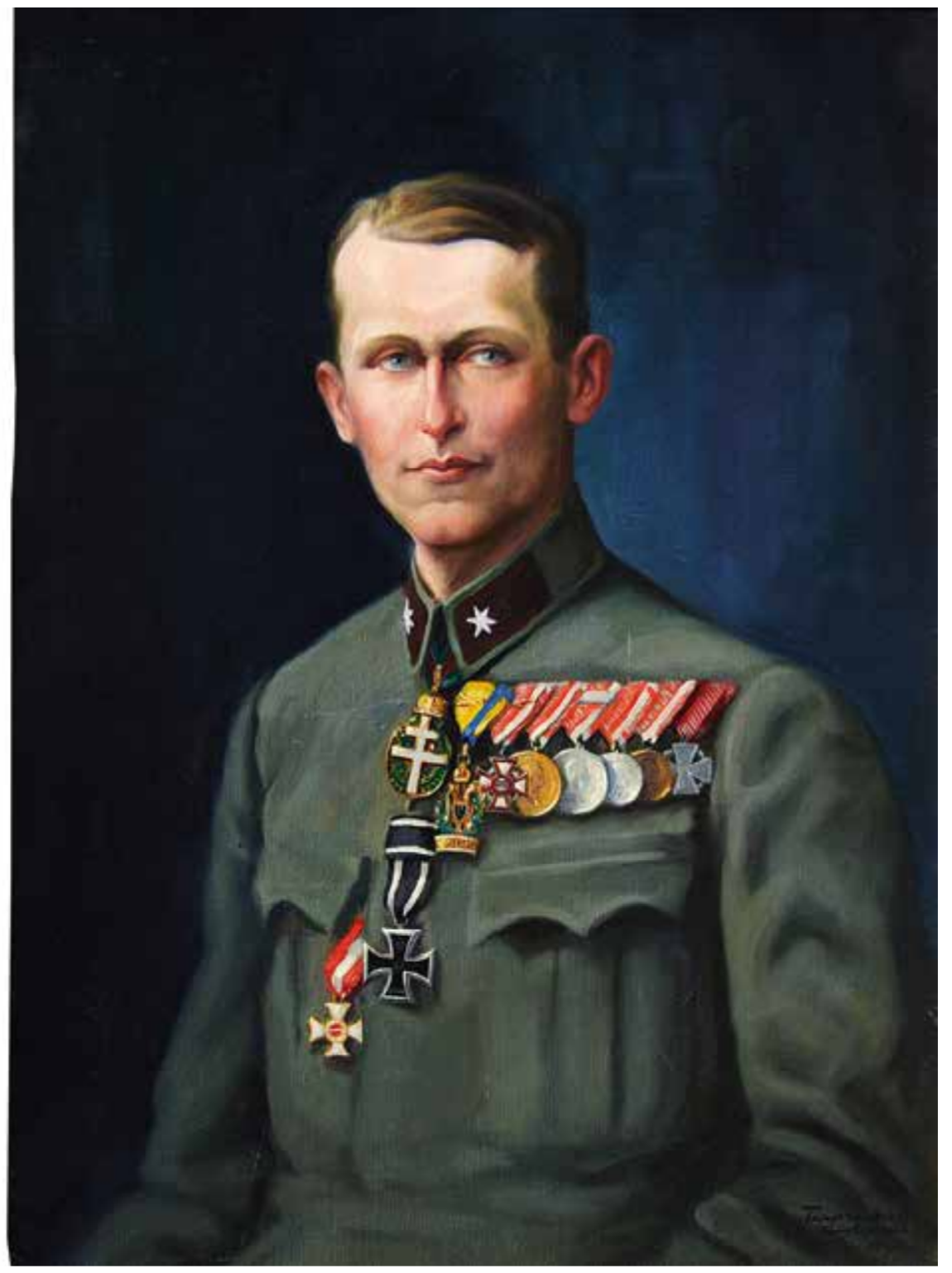
Emil Poppr

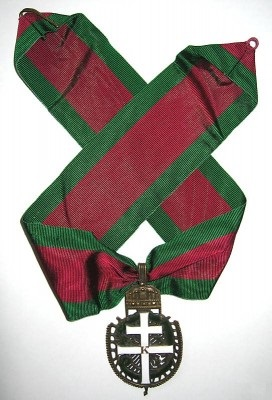
Badge of the knights of the golden spur

The Würzburg historian, Reinhard Freiherr von Bibra (1845–1926), in his study of Charles IV coronation (1916) published an image of the potential badge worn by the knights on their hats (a buttercup with golden spur and egret feathers), but he did not support it with sustainable historical sources. His aim goes back to some older descriptions telling that the Hungarian knights of golden spur wore a small gold spur not just on their boots, but beneath their hat buttercups, as well.

== Legacy ==
In 2011, the knightly society has been re-established as a self styled order in the Franciscan Church of Esztergom (the first knightings were made on 30 April), under the name Aranysarkantyús Vitézi Lovagrend (Ordine Equitum Auratorum, Ritterorden vom Goldenen Sporn); in reality it is a private organization following Austrian Association Law with a seat in Götzis, Austria. The order has three classes, but did not take over the 1918 decorative medal. (However, the badge resembles the medal described by Kassics in 1840.) For this reason, it has to be seen as a distinct order. However, they confess themselves to the history of the Hungarian knights of golden spur. The first grand master to be appointed was Sándor Habsburg-Lothringen (1965– ), a member of the Tuscan branch of the Habsburg-Lothringen family and active promoter of several self styled orders.

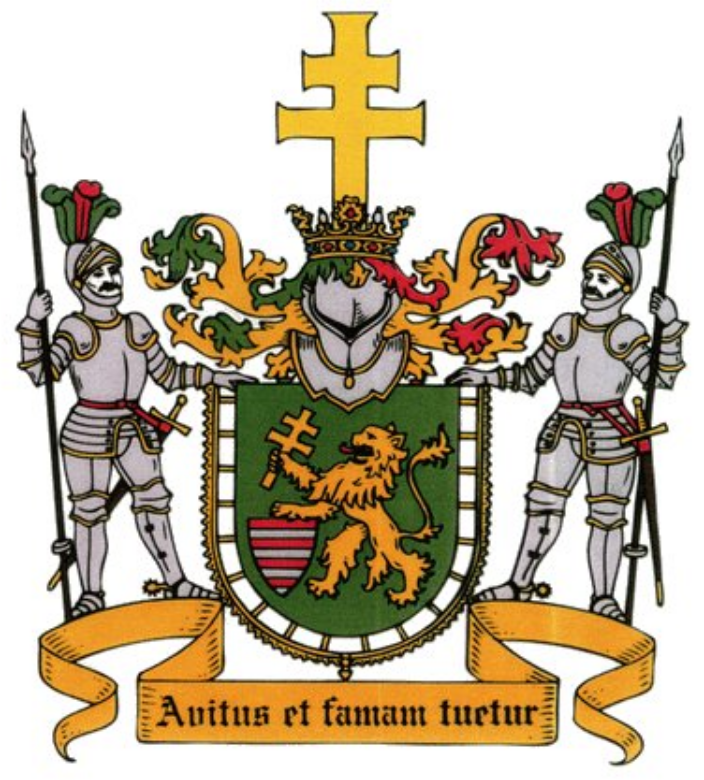
Coat of arms of Aranysarkantyús Vitézi Lovagrend

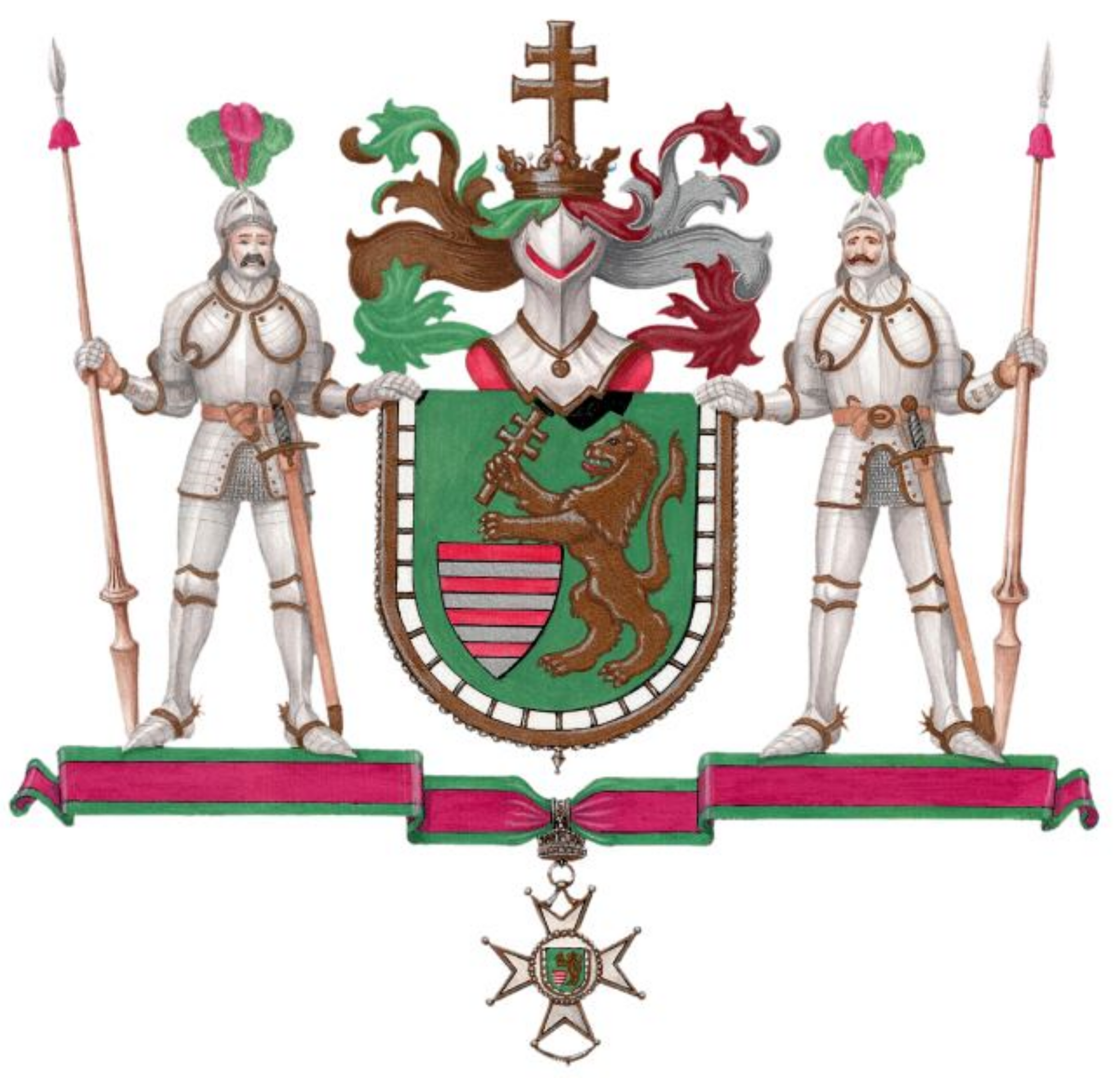
Coat of arms of Aranysarkantyús Vitézi Lovagrend

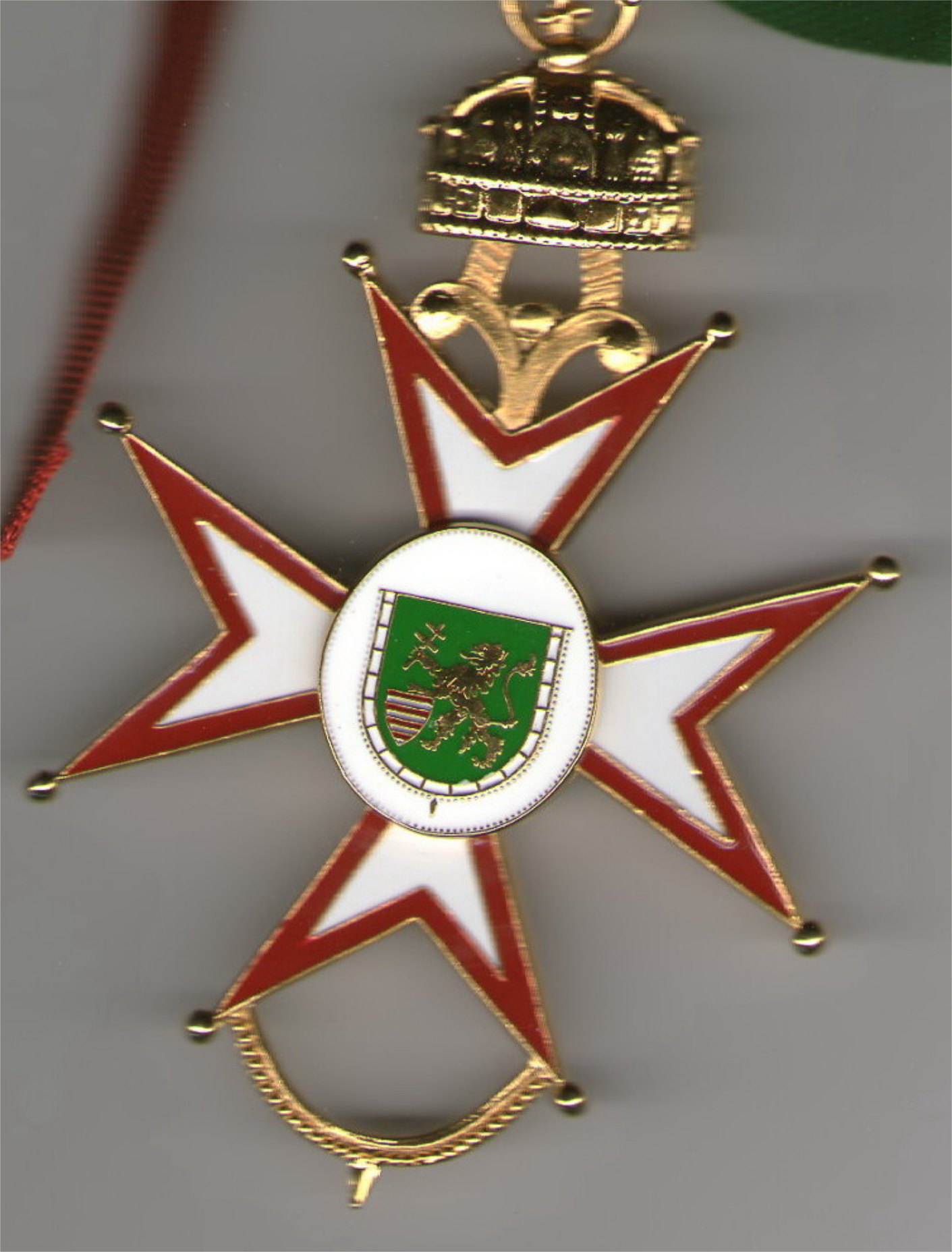
Knight

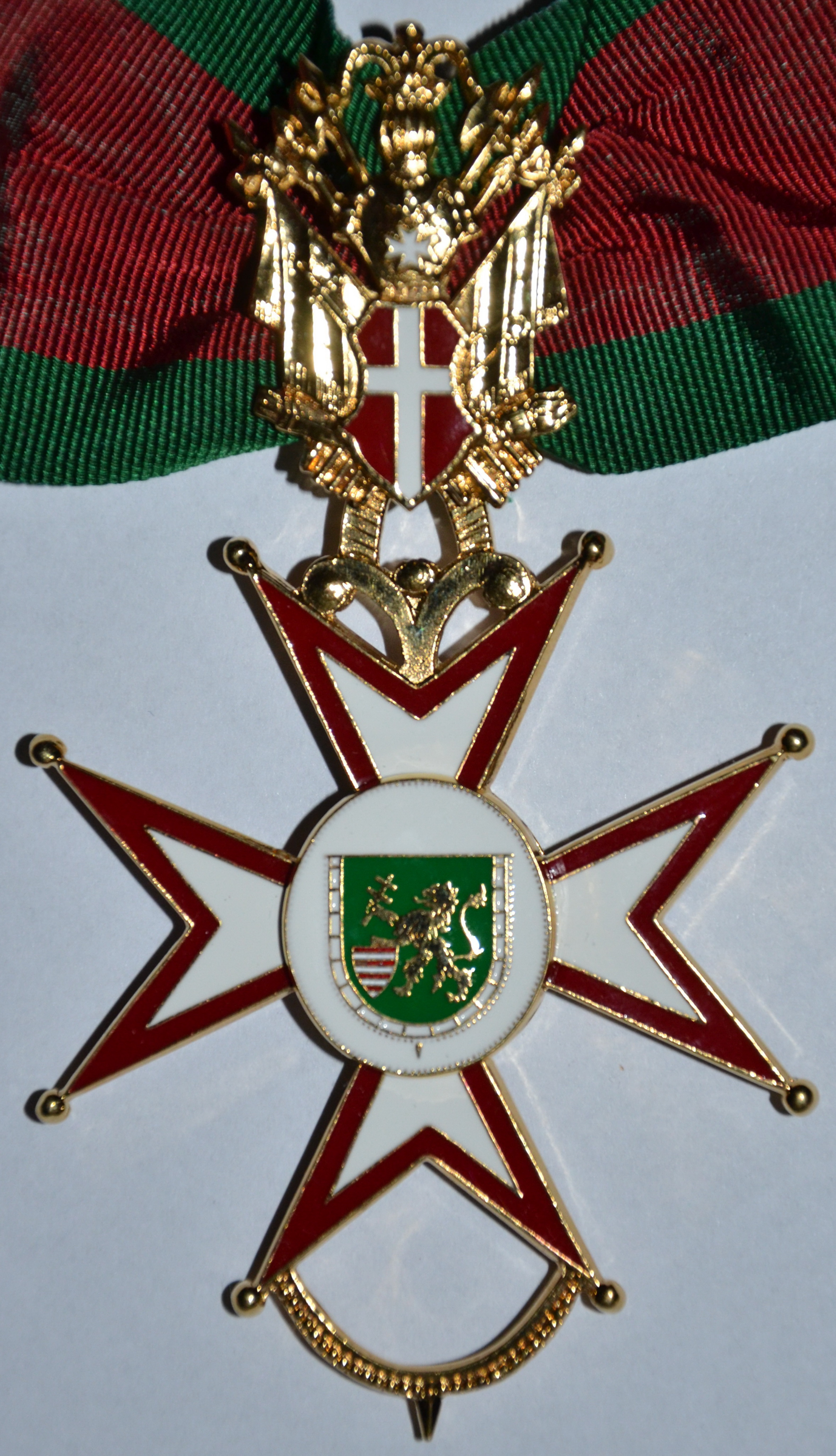
Prior

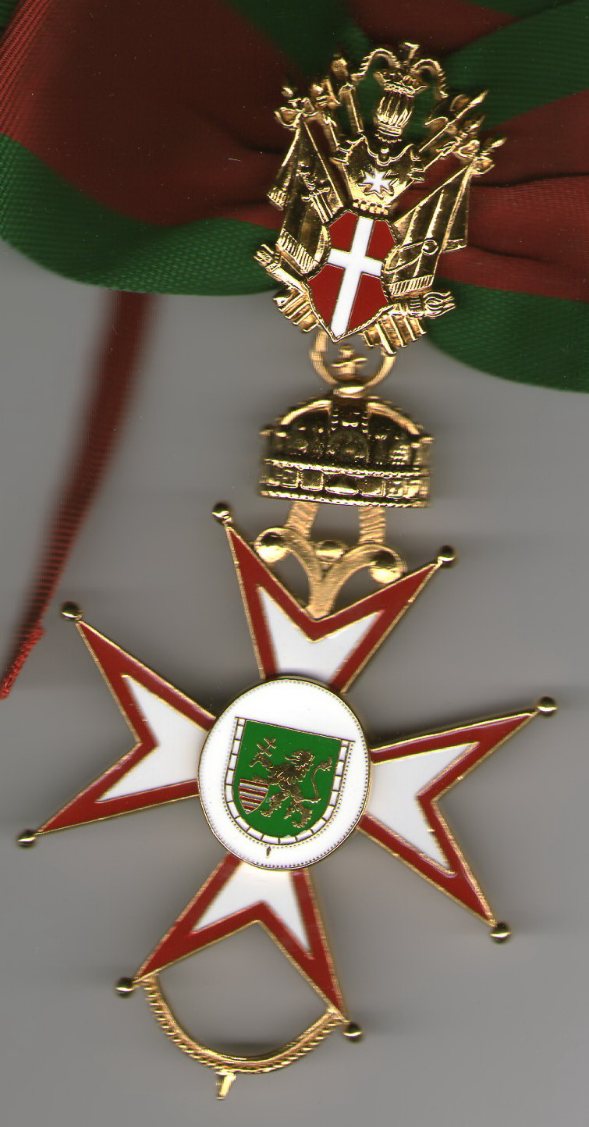
Chancellor, Grand Prior

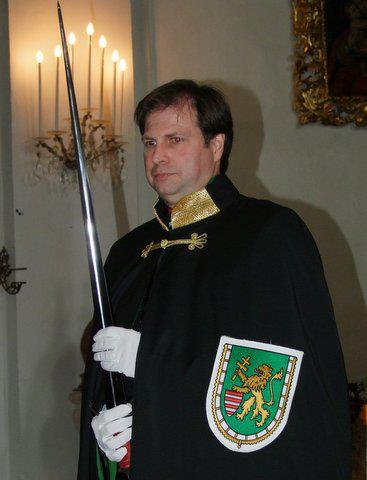
Sándor Habsburg-Lothringen (1965- ), Grand Master of the order

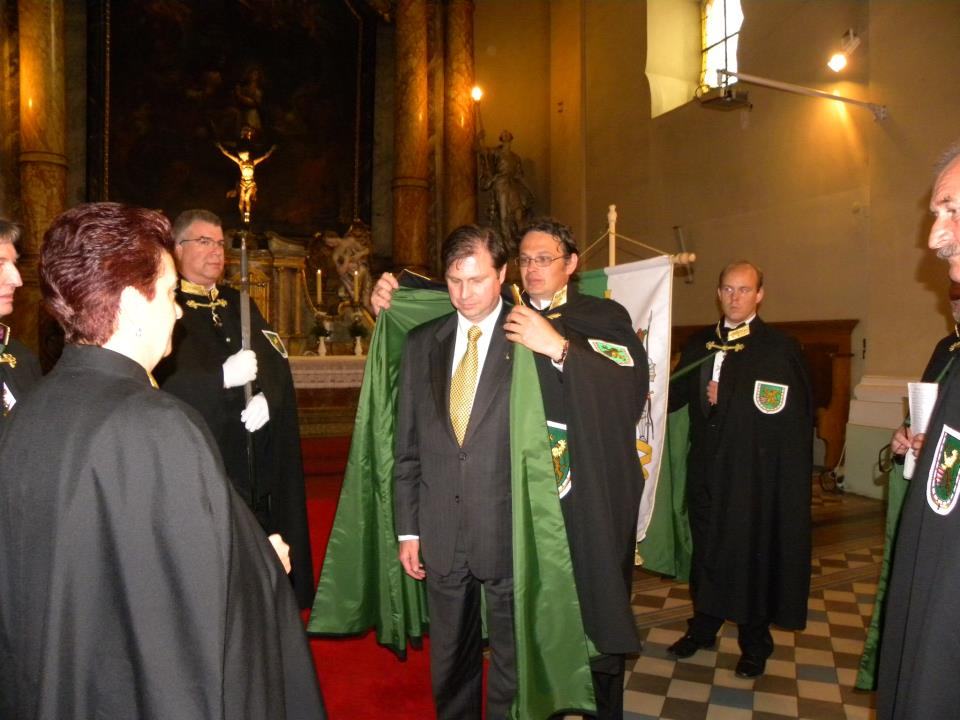
Investiture of Grand Master, Esztergom 2012

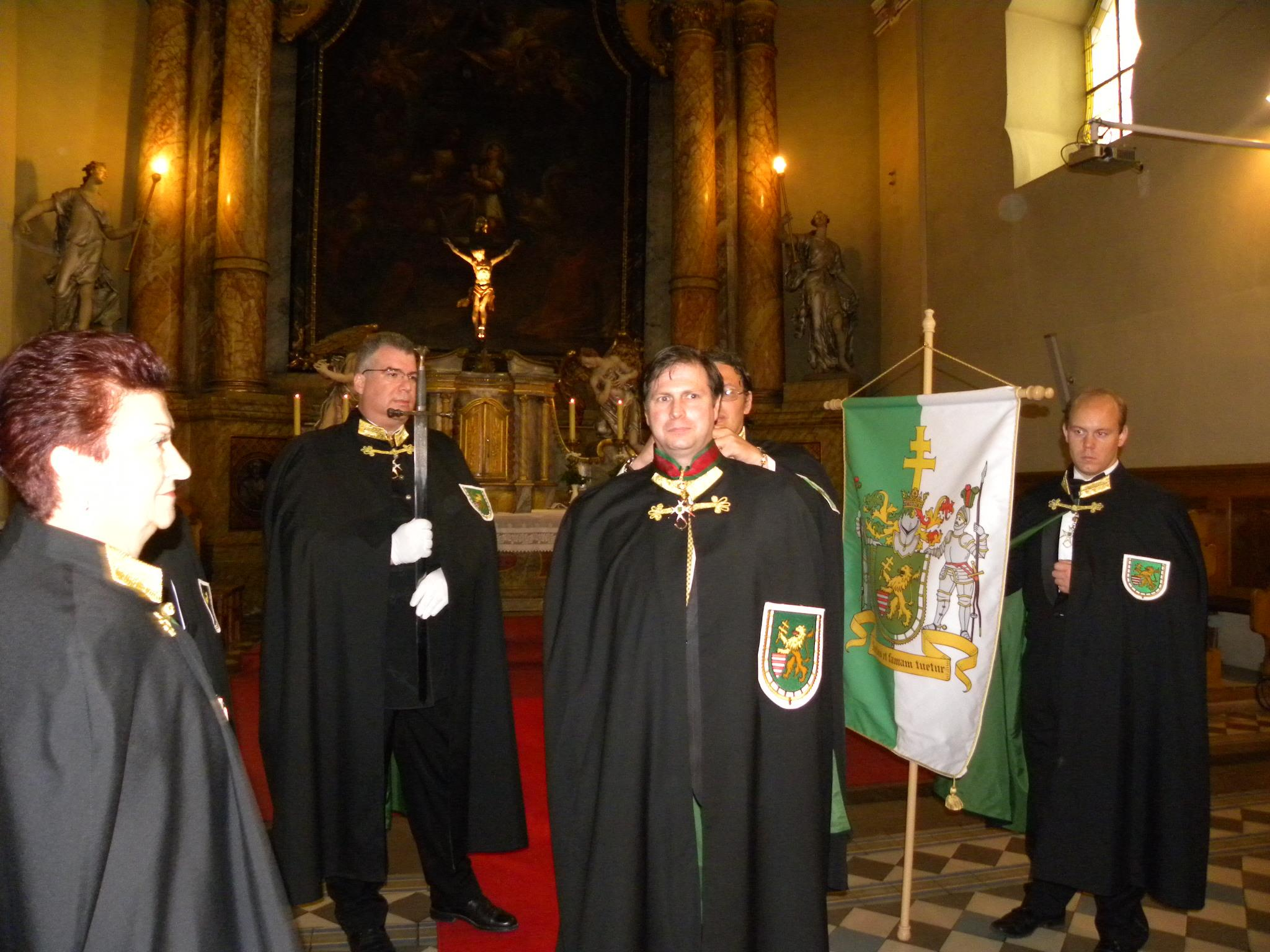
Investiture of Grand Master, Esztergom 2012

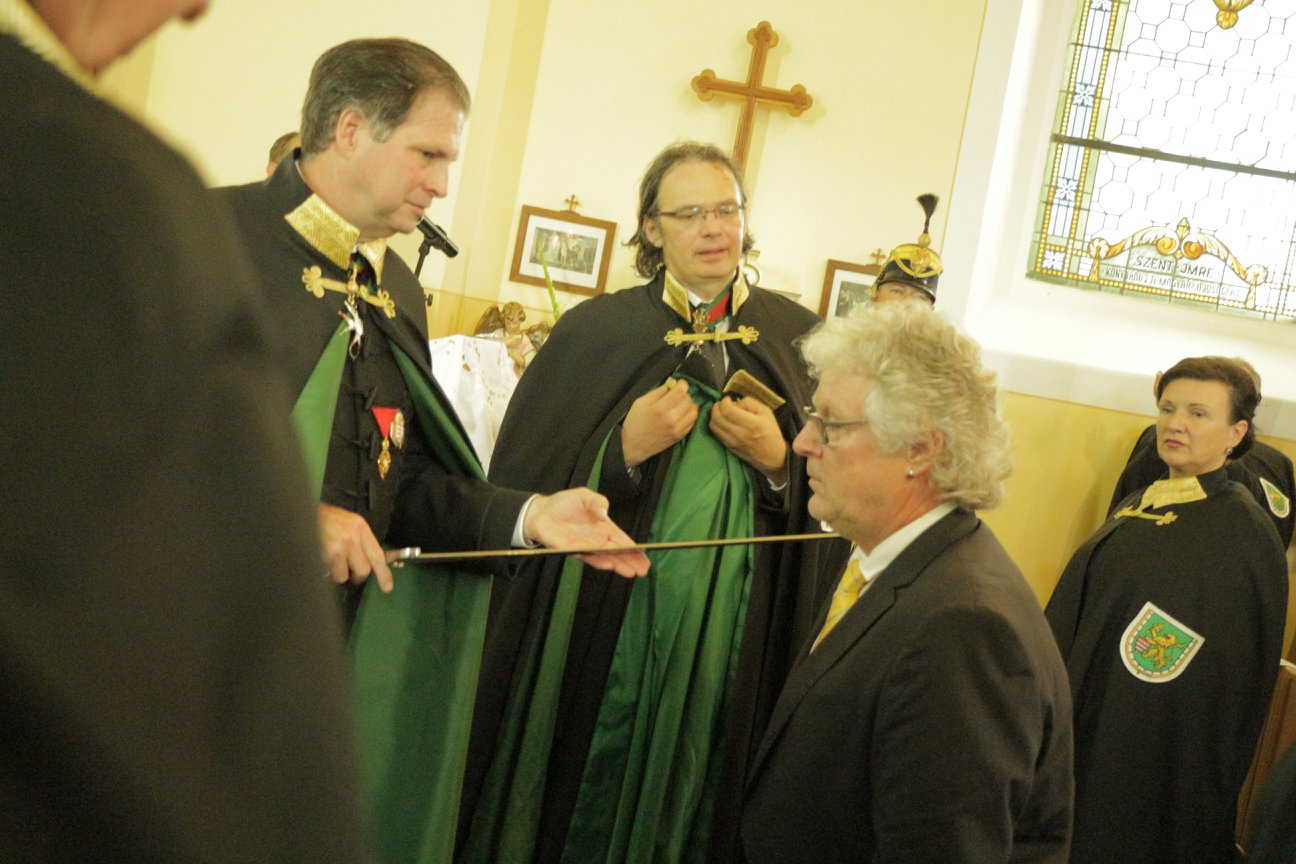
Creation of new knights, 2018

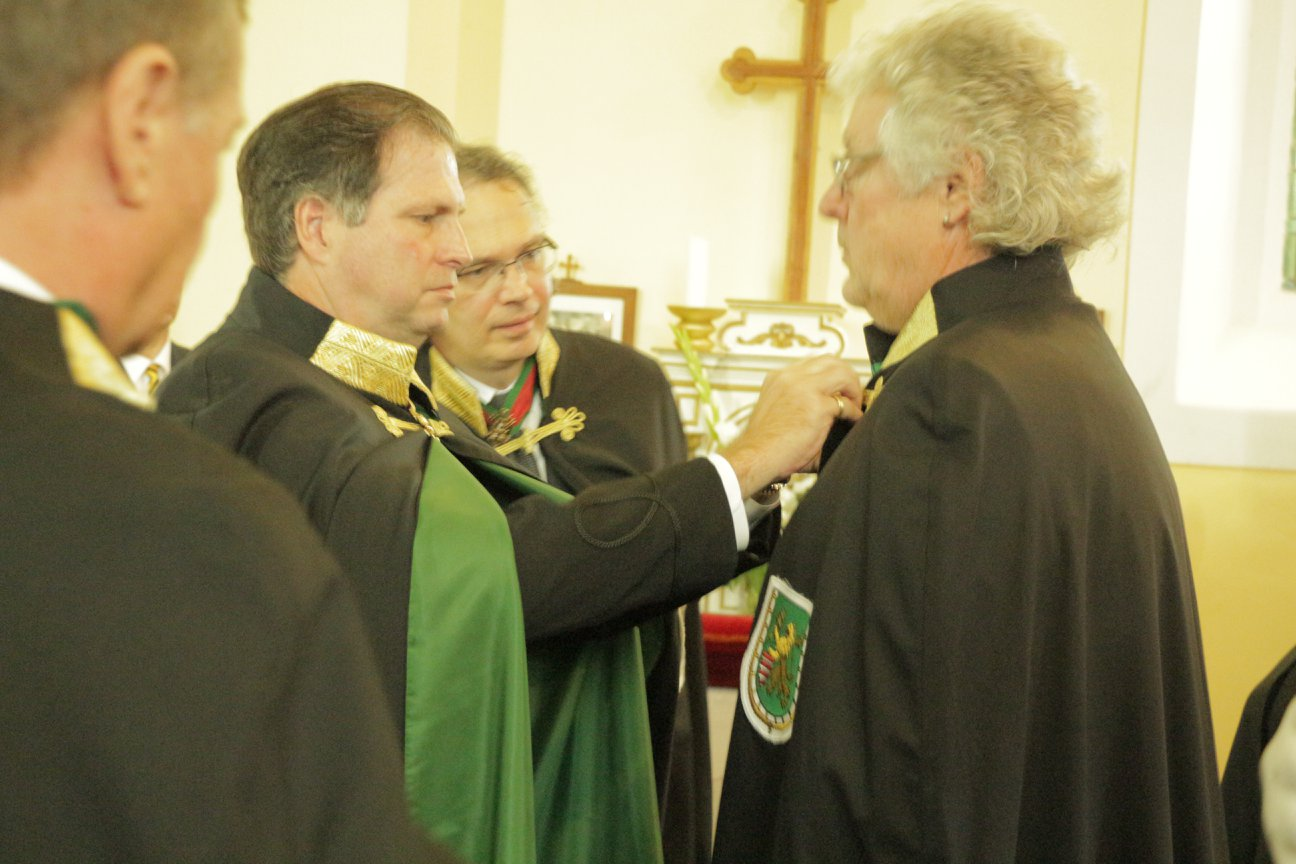
Creation of new knights, 2018

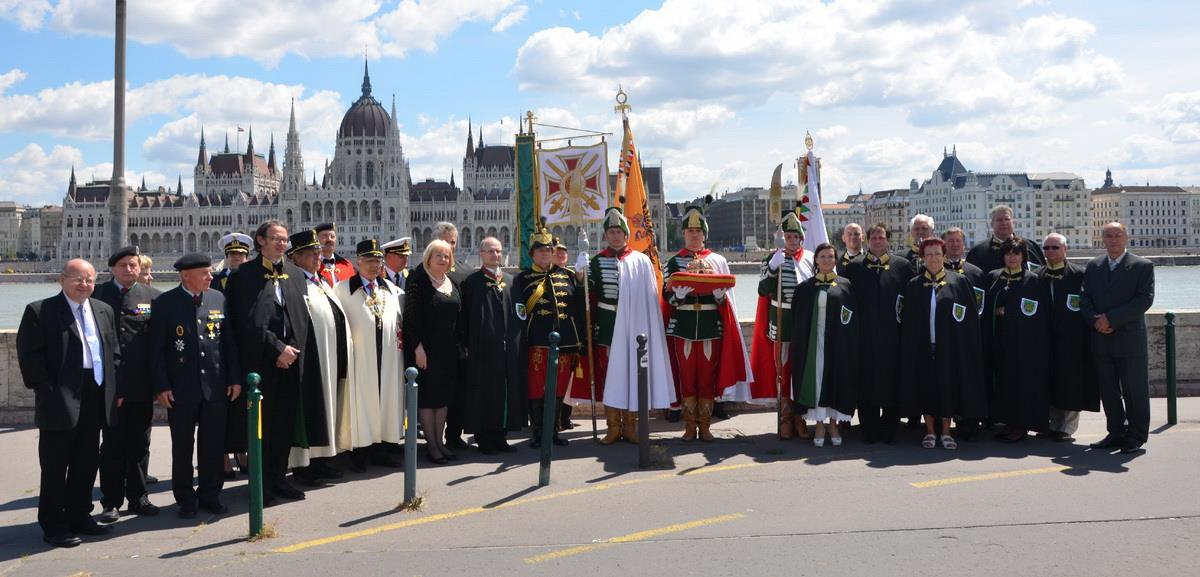
Guards of the Holy Crown of Hungary as well as knights and the Grand Master of Aranysarkantyús Vitézi Lovagrend

== Literature ==
József Pintér: Conspectus equestrium ordinum per Europam omnem florentium. Nagyszombat, 1742.

Adalbert Barics: A' magyar királyok' és királynék' koronáztatásoknak inneplése, melylynek szokott szer-tartásait Német nyelven le-írta és közre botsátotta N. Nemzetes Barits Albert, a' Törvénynek Tudósda, és a' Pesti. Királyi, Tudomány' Mindenese benn, ugyan azon, Törvénynek Tanítója. Magyarra fordította Lambach Elek, Kegyes Iskola-béli Pap, és a' Pesti Iskolákbann a' Szelídebb Tudományoknak Tanítójok. Pest, 1790. In German: Die gewöhnliche Krönungsfeyer der ungarischen Könige und Königinnen. Pest, 1790.

Antal Cziráky: De Ordine Eqvitvm Avratorvm Hvngariae Antonii e Comitibvs Cziráky de Dienesfalva Exercitatio. Pest, 1792.

Ignácz Kisfaludi Kassics: Érdem koszorúk, vagy Értekezés A' Felséges Austriai, Császári és Királyi uralkodó Házat illető Jeles Rendekrűl, megtiszteltetésekrűl és jutalmazásokrúl, toldalékkép pedig Europában most virágzó egyéb Jeles Rendekrűl is. Vienna, 1840. 299–308.

Gergely Pál Sallay – János Szentváry-Lukács: Az aranysarkantyús vitézek jelvénye. In: A Hadtörténeti Múzeum Értesítője. 16. Budapest, 2016.

Fanni Hende: Politikai reprezentáció a magyar országgyűléseken 1687 és 1765 között. Budapest, 2017. 97–102.

Johann Stolzer – Christian Steeb: Österreichs Orden vom Mittelalter bis zur Gegenwart. Graz, 1996. 197–202.

Václav Měřička: Orden und Ehrenzeichen der Österreichisch-Ungarischen Monarchie. Wien, 1974.

Günther Kronenbitter: Krieg im Frieden. Die Führung der k.u.k. Armee und die Großmachtpolitik Österreich-Ungarns 1906–1914. München, 2003.
