= International Order of Saint Stanislaus =

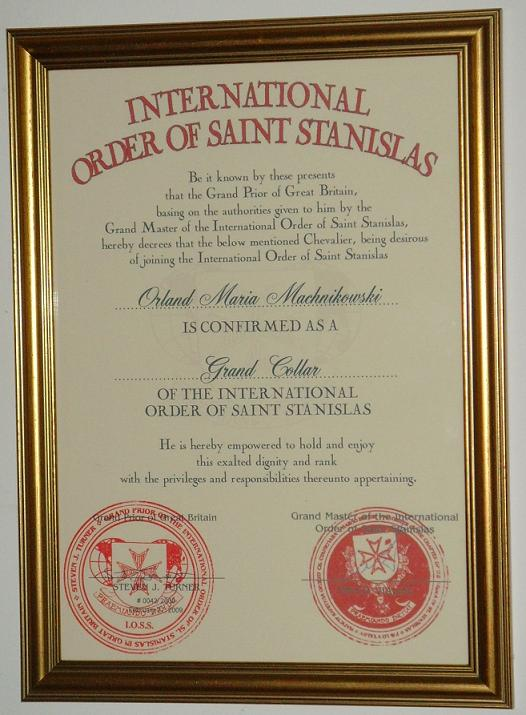
Certificate of International Order of Saint Stanislas

The International Order of Saint Stanislaus is a Polish fraternal order founded on 16 May 2004.

Although claiming to follow the "code of chivalry" it acknowledges itself as a recently founded private organisation without fount of honour and no legitimate order of chivalry. In doing so, the organisation frankly acknowledges the problems with its background organisation, Ordo Sancti Stanislai founded by Juliusz Nowina-Sokolnicki in 1979 as an attempted revival of the Polish Order of Saint Stanislaus, in turn founded in 1765.

The International Order of Saint Stanislaus is generally regarded as a fraternal order. It has been compared to the masonic movement.

== History ==
=== Background ===
In 1979, Juliusz Nowina-Sokolnicki and a Polish exile group claiming to be the legitimate government founded the Ordo Sancti Stanislai, attempting to revive the Polish Order of Saint Stanislaus, founded in 1765 as an order of knighthood of the Polish–Lithuanian Commonwealth, since it had been incorporated by the Russian Empire in 1831 as the Order of Saint Stanislaus (Imperial House of Romanov).

However, the management of the new organisation resulted in several claimed successor movements. During the 1990s, disputes with Juliusz Nowina-Sokolnicki caused several national sub-groups of this organisation, called priories, to break away.

=== Foundation ===
In 2004, several of the existing national priories of the Ordo Sancti Stanislai joined together to create the International Order of Saint Stanislaus as an alliance of national groups.
