= Ordo Sancti Stanislai =

The Ordo Sancti Stanislai is a Polish self-styled order founded on 9 June 1979 by Juliusz Nowina-Sokolnicki, in his claimed capacity as disputed President of the Polish Government in exile as an attempted revival of the Polish Order of Saint Stanislaus, founded in 1765 as an order of knighthood of the Polish–Lithuanian Commonwealth, since it had been incorporated by the Russian Empire in 1831 as the Order of Saint Stanislaus (Imperial House of Romanov).

However, mismanagement of the Ordo Sancti Stanislai resulted in several claimed successor movements. During the 1990s, disputes with Juliusz Nowina-Sokolnicki caused several national sub-groups of this organisation, called priories, to break away. Several of these united in 2004 to create a joint Polish successor, the International Order of Saint Stanislaus as an alliance of national groups.

== History ==
The self-proclaimed version of the history of the organisation has Sokolnicki transforming the Order of Saint Stanislaus into a private charitable institution on 15 September 1990, before transferring his authority to the new Polish government of Lech Wałęsa in December of the same year. Prior to his death on 17 August 2009, Sokolnicki appointed Polish businessman Jan Zbigniew Potocki as his successor. Potocki was fired by the Ordo Sancti Stanislai in February 2010 "after he violated the Constitution of the Order repeatedly." On 16 February 2011, Waldemar Wilk was appointed new Grand Master. Perhaps not surprisingly, in a recreation of the circumstances that brought Juliusz Nowina-Sokolnicki to his disputed office as president, Waldemar Wilk claims that he was the legitimately designated successor to Sokolnicki but that Jan Zbigniew Potocki somehow managed to obtain the position ahead of him.

=== Succession debate ===
There have been several organisations which claim to be the heirs of the Polish Order of Saint Stanislaus. Ordo Sancti Stanislai has been one of the more prominent attempts, founded (or revived) by Juliusz Nowina-Sokolnicki who claimed to be the president of the Polish government-in-exile from 1972 until the restoration of Polish democracy in 1990. In his capacity as president, he claimed to restore the Order of Saint Stanislaus on 9 June 1979. Sokolnicki's claim to the Polish presidency was widely rejected and he is not recognized by the current government of Poland (in 1990, Lech Wałęsa accepted symbols of the pre-War presidency from Ryszard Kaczorowski). Sokolnicki's status was enhanced by the fact that he was an associate of August Zaleski, generally recognized as the head of the Polish government-in-exile from 1947 to 1972. That connection gave Sokolnicki's order a veneer of legitimacy that other such endeavors lacked.

After Lech Wałęsa became President of Poland with universal recognition on 22 December 1990, the rationale for the governments in exile ended. Sokolnicki followed the path of his rival, Ryszard Kaczorowski, in formally recognizing Wałęsa as his successor. Nevertheless, Sokolnicki claimed to retain the office of Grand Master in his Order of Saint Stanislaus. He based his continued control of the order partially on his status as an independent bishop after his ordination in 1983. Ultimately, Sokolnicki claimed that the grand mastership was an hereditary office for his family. The result was the division of the order into several competing groups, none of which recognize the claims of the others. On 27 January 1997 disgruntled members of the Order deposed Sokolnicki and replaced him with Zbigniew Kazimierz. The Polish government does not accept any of these groups as legitimate.

== Organisation ==
The Ordo Sancti Stanislai says of itself: "The Order of Saint Stanislas is a hierarchically organized body of men and women, many with a Polish Connection, who support and assist in charitable works of various kinds to help the poor and disadvantaged in Poland and in other countries throughout the world. Originally a dynastic chivalric order from Poland, it is now an international charitable non-profit association in the form of a private chivalric order."
