= Stanislav =

Stanislav and variants may refer to:

== People ==
- Stanislav (given name), a Slavic given name with many spelling variations (Stanislaus, Stanislas, Stanisław, etc.)

== Places ==
- Stanislav, Kherson Oblast, a coastal village in Ukraine
- Stanislau, German name of Ivano-Frankivsk, Ukraine
- Stanislaus County, California, United States
- Stanislaus River, California
- Stanislaus National Forest, California
- Place Stanislas, a square in Nancy, France, World Heritage Site of UNESCO

== Schools ==
- Collège Stanislas de Paris, an institution in Paris, France
- California State University, Stanislaus, a public university in Turlock

== Other uses ==
- "Stanislaus", a 2009 song from White Water, White Bloom by Sea Wolf

== See also ==
- Stanislov (Hasidic dynasty)
- Jesus Estanislao, Secretary of Finance of the Philippines, 1990–1992
