= Ryszard =

Ryszard ([ˈrɘʂart]) is the Polish equivalent of "Richard", and may refer to:

- Ryszard Andrzejewski (born 1976), Polish rap musician, songwriter and producer
- Ryszard Bakst (1926–1999), Polish and British pianist and piano teacher of Jewish/Polish/Russian origin
- Ryszard Bartel (1897–1982), Polish engineer, aircraft designer, pioneer and aviator
- Ryszard Bender (1932–2016), Polish politician and historian, specialist in the history of the January Uprising
- Ryszard Wincenty Berwiński (1817–1879), Polish poet, translator, folklorist, and nationalist
- Ryszard Białous (1914–1992), Polish scoutmaster (harcmistrz) captain of the AK-Szare Szeregi
- Ryszard Bober (born 1956), Polish politician, Vice-Chairperson of Kuyavian-Pomeranian Regional Assembly
- Ryszard Bogusz (born 1951), Lutheran theologian, bishop of the diocese Wroclaw of the Evangelical Augsburg Church in Poland
- Ryszard Bolesławski (1889–1937), Polish film director, actor and teacher of acting
- Ryszard Bosek (born 1950), former volleyball player from Poland, played in the team that won the gold medal at the 1976 Summer Olympics
- Ryszard Bugaj (born 1944), Polish politician and economist, former advisor to Lech Kaczyński
- Ryszard Bugajski (1943–2019), Polish film director and screenwriter
- Ryszard Ćwikła (1946–1992), Polish alpine skier who competed in the 1968 Winter Olympics
- Ryszard Cyroń (born 1965), retired Polish football player
- Ryszard Czarnecki (born 1963), British-born Polish politician, Member of the European Parliament
- Ryszard Czerniawski (1952–2019), Polish lawyer and economist
- Ryszard Czerwiec (born 1968), Polish football player
- Ryszard Dembinski (1924–2008), Polish Cavalry officer and D-Day Veteran
- Ryszard Długosz (born 1941), Polish former wrestler
- Ryszard Engelking (born 1935), Polish mathematician
- Ryszard Filipski (1934–2021), Polish actor
- Ryszard Gajewski (born 1954), Polish mountaineer
- Ryszard Galla (born 1956), Polish politician
- Ryszard Garnys (born 1947), retired Polish triple jumper
- Ryszard Gawlor (born 1943), Polish luger who competed in the late 1960s
- Ryszard Głowacki (born 1937), Polish engineer of geology, writer and publicist
- Ryszard Grobelny (born 1963), mayor of Poznań since 1998
- Ryszard Gryglewski (1932–2023), Polish physician
- Ryszard Grzegorczyk (1939–2021), former Polish football player
- Ryszard Horowitz (born 1939), born in Kraków, Poland
- Ryszard Jankowski (born 1960), retired Polish footballer (goalkeeper)
- Ryszard Jedliński (born 1953), former Polish handball player
- Ryszard Kaczorowski hon GCMG (1919–2010), the last President of the Polish government in exile
- Ryszard Kaczyński (born 1954), Polish politician
- Ryszard Kalisz (born 1957), Polish politician
- Ryszard Kapuściński (1932–2007), Polish journalist whose dispatches in book form brought him a global reputation
- Ryszard Katus (born 1947), Polish athlete, competed mainly in the men's decathlon
- Ryszard Knosala (born 1949), Polish politician
- Ryszard Kole, Polish-American pharmacologist
- Ryszard Komornicki (born 1959), retired Polish footballer, currently manager of Górnik Zabrze
- Ryszard Koncewicz (died 2001), Polish soccer player as well as a coach
- Ryszard Kornacki (born 1940), it a Polish poet and essayist from Międzyrzec Podlaski
- Ryszard Kosiński (1955–2010), Polish sprint canoeist who competed in the mid-1970s
- Ryszard Kotla (born 1947), Polish travel writer, tour guide, activist, journalist, academic teacher and lifeguard instructor
- Ryszard Kubiak (1950–2022), Polish rower who competed in three Olympics
- Ryszard Kukliński (1930–2004), Polish colonel and Cold War spy
- Ryszard Kulesza (1931–2008), Polish footballer, coach and official
- Ryszard Jaxa-Małachowski Kulisicz, Peruvian architect of Polish and Slovak origin
- Ryszard Kunze (born 1939), Polish fencer
- Oskar Ryszard Lange (1904–1965), Polish economist and diplomat
- Ryszard Legutko (born 1949), Polish professor of philosophy, writer and politician
- Ryszard Lubicz, fictional character from Polish television series Klan
- Ryszard Malachowskis (born 1965), retired male decathlete
- Ryszard Marchlik (1939–2015), Polish sprint canoeist who competed in the 1960s
- Ryszard Marczak (born 1945), former long-distance runner from Poland
- Ryszard Marzec (1931–1972), Polish field hockey player
- Ryszard Mordarski (born 1976), Polish slalom canoeist who competed in the mid-1990s
- Ryszard Musielak (born 1950), one of the leaders of the Polish illegal Solidarity union in Toruń
- Ryszard Nowak, Polish politician, member of Prawo i Sprawiedliwość (Law and Justice) party
- Ryszard Oborski (born 1952), Polish sprint canoeist
- Ryszard Ochyra (born 1949), Polish bryologist
- Ryszard Ordynski (1878–1953), Polish film director
- Ryszard Ostrowski (born 1961), male former track and field middle distance runner from Poland
- Ryszard Pacławski (born 1958), Polish lawyer, Scoutmaster and former Chief Scout from 1991 to 2000
- Ryszard Parulski (1938–2017), Polish fencer
- Ryszard Pawłowski (born 1950), Polish alpine and high-altitude climber and photographer
- Ryszard Pędrak-Janowicz (1932–2004), Polish luger
- Ryszard Peryt (1947–2019), Polish opera director, conductor, producer and actor
- Andrzej Ryszard Piątkowski (1934–2010), Polish sabreur and Olympic medallist
- Ryszard Piec (1913–1979), Polish soccer player
- Ryszard Pilarczyk (born 1975), former Polish athlete specializing in sprinting events
- Ryszard Podlas (born 1954), Polish athlete who competed mainly in the 400 metres
- Ryszard Przecicki (1934–2009), Australian businessman, chairman of Visy Industries
- Ryszard Przybysz (1950–2002), Polish handball player
- Ryszard Reiff (1923–2007), Polish politician, lawyer, publicist and resistance fighter
- Ryszard Riedel (1956–1994), lead singer of the blues-rock band Dżem
- Ryszard Rumianek (1947–2010), the rector of Cardinal Stefan Wyszyński University in Warsaw
- Ryszard Schnepf, Polish politician, deputy foreign minister from 2007 to 2008
- Ryszard Ścigalski (born 1954), Polish former wrestler who competed in the 1980 Summer Olympics
- Ryszard Seruga (born 1953), Polish slalom canoeist who competed in the 1970s and 1980s
- Krzysztof Ryszard Sikora (born 1959), Polish politician
- Ryszard Siwiec (1909–1968), the first person to commit suicide by self-immolation in protest against the Soviet-led invasion of Czechoslovakia
- Ryszard Skowronek (born 1949), retired male decathlete from Poland
- Ryszard Skwarski (1930–1996), Polish sprint canoeist
- Ryszard Sobczak (born 1967), Polish fencer
- Ryszard Stadniuk (born 1951), Polish rower
- Ryszard Stanibuła (1950–2025), member of the Polish People’s Party
- Ryszard Staniek (born 1973), former Polish football midfielder
- Ryszard Świętochowski (1882–1941), Polish politician, publicist and engineer
- Ryszard Syski (1924–2007), Polish-American mathematician
- Ryszard Szurkowski (1946–2021), retired road bicycle racer from Poland
- Ryszard Szymczak (1944–1996), former Polish football player
- Ryszard Tarasiewicz (born 1962), retired Polish football player
- Ryszard Tomczyk (born 1959), Polish politician, a historian, and a member of Local government
- Ryszard Torzecki (1925–2003), Polish historian, specializing in the Polish-Ukrainian relations
- Ryszard Tylewski (born 1952), Polish sprint canoeist who competed in the mid-1970s
- Ryszard Wasko, Polish artist in multimedia, photography, film, video, installation, painting, and drawing
- Ryszard Wawryniewicz (born 1962), Polish politician
- Ryszard Wieczorek (born 1962), manager of the Polish football team Górnik Zabrze
- Ryszard Wójcik (born 1956), retired Polish football referee
- Ryszard Wolny (born 1969), Polish wrestler and Olympic champion in Greco-Roman wrestling
- Ryszard Zakrzewski, Polish traveler, topographer, and an officer in the Russian Army who lived in the 19th century
- Ryszard Zbrzyzny (born 1955), Polish politician
- Ryszard Zub (1934–2015), Polish fencer
