= Głowacki =

Głowacki, Glovatsky, Hlovatskyi, Golovatsky, or Holovatskyi is a surname derived from golva (Slavic for "head"). Its Ukrainian and Belarusian forms are generally transcribed beginning with an 'H' but may also be written with a 'G'.

Language	Masculine	Feminine	Plural
Polish	Głowacki ([ɡwɔˈvat͡ski])	Głowacka ([ɡwɔˈvat͡ska])	Głowaccy ([ɡwɔˈvat͡st͡sɨ])
Belarusian (Romanization)	Галавацкі (Halavacki, Halavatski); Главацкі (Hlavacki, Hlavatski)	Галавацкая (Halavackaja, Halavatskaya, Halavatskaia); Главацкая (Hlavackaja, Hlavatskaya, Hlavatskaia)	
Russian (Romanization)	Головацкий (Golovatsky, Golovatskiy, Golovatskij); Гловацкий (Glovatsky, Glovatskiy, Glovatskij)	Головацкая (Golovatskaya, Golovatskaia, Golovatskaja); Гловацкая (Glovatskaya, Glovatskaia, Glovatskaja)	
Ukrainian (Romanization)	Головацький (Holovatskyi, Holovatskyy, Holovatskyj); Гловацький (Hlovatskyi, Hlovatskyy, Hlovatskyj)	Головацька (Holovatska); Гловацька (Hlovatska)	Головацькі (Holovatski); Гловацькі (Hlovatski)

== People ==
Notable people with the surname include:

- Aleksander Głowacki (a.k.a. Bolesław Prus; 1847–1912), Polish novelist, essayist, and journalist
- Anton Glovatsky (born 1988), Russian ice hockey player
- Arkadiusz Głowacki (born 1979), Polish footballer
- Andrzej Głowacki, Polish philosopher, professor, and graphic artist
- Antoni Głowacki (1910–1980), Polish fighter pilot
- Dawid Głowacki (born 1987), Polish cyclist
- Jan Nepomucen Głowacki (1802–1847), Polish painter
- Janusz Głowacki (1938–2017), Polish-born American playwright, essayist, and screenwriter
- Jerzy Głowacki (1950–2022), Polish cyclist and Olympics competitor
- Krzysztof Głowacki (born 1986), Polish boxer
- Léon Glovacki (1928–2009), French footballer
- Marcin Głowacki (born 1973), Polish ice dancer and Olympics competitor
- Piotr Głowacki (born 1980), Polish actor
- Ryszard Głowacki (born 1937), Polish geological engineer, writer, and publicist
- Vadim Glovatsky (1970–2015), Kazakhstani ice hockey player and Olympics competitor
- Wojciech Bartosz Głowacki (1758–1794), Polish insurgent
- Yakiv Holovatsky (1814–1888), Ukrainian writer and academic

== See also ==
- Bartosz Głowacki (armoured train) (c.1919–1939), a Polish army train
