= Anglicisation (linguistics) =

Practice of modifying words for English

In linguistics, anglicisation or anglicization is the practice of modifying foreign words, names, and phrases to make them easier to spell, pronounce, or understand in English. The term commonly refers to the respelling of foreign words or loan words in English, often to a more drastic degree than that implied in, for example, romanisation. One instance is the word "dandelion", modified from the French dent-de-lion ("lion's tooth", a reference to the plant's sharply indented leaves). The term can also refer to phonological adaptation without spelling change: for example, pasta (pronounced [ˈpasta] in Italian) is accepted in English with Italian spelling, but anglicised phonetically in being pronounced /ˈpɑːstə/ in American English and /ˈpæstə/ in British English. The anglicisation of non-English words for use in English is just one case of the more widespread domestication of foreign words that is a feature of many languages, sometimes involving shifts in meaning. The term does not cover the unmodified adoption of foreign words into English (e.g. kindergarten) or the unmodified adoption of English words into foreign languages (e.g. internet, computer, web).

== Loan words ==
Non-English words may be anglicised by changing their form and/or pronunciation to something more familiar to English speakers. Changing grammatical endings is especially common. The Latin word obscenus /obskeːnʊs/ has been imported into English in the modified form "obscene" /əbˈsiːn/. The plural form of a foreign word may be modified to fit English norms more conveniently, like using "indexes" as the plural of index, rather than indices, as in Latin. The word "opera" (itself the plural form of the Latin word opus) is understood in English to be a singular noun, so it has received an English plural form, "operas". The English word "damsel" is an anglicisation of the Old French damoisele (modern demoiselle), meaning "young lady". Another form of anglicising is the inclusion of a foreign article as part of a noun (such as alkali from the Arabic al-qily). "Rotten Row", the name of a London pathway that was a fashionable place to ride horses in the 18th and 19th centuries, is an adaptation of the French phrase Route du Roi. The word "genie" has been anglicised via Latin from jinn or djinn from Arabic: الجن, al-jinn originally meaning demon or spirit. Some changes are motivated by the desire to preserve the pronunciation of the word in the original language, such as the word "schtum", which is a phonetic spelling for the German word stumm, meaning silent.

The French word "homage" was introduced by the Normans after 1066, (Note: Earl and nobles would pay "homage" to the king.) and its pronunciation became anglicised as /ˈhɒmɪdʒ/, with stress on the first syllable; but in recent times showbusiness and Hollywood have taken to pronouncing "homage" in the French fashion, rhyming with "fromage".

== Place names ==
Some places are named something different in English than they are in their native language, e.g. Florence for Firenze. This is not always the case; some places are just transferred instead, e.g. old names like Amsterdam and Madrid and new names like Port-au-Prince.

De-anglicisation has become a matter of national pride in some places and especially in regions that were once under colonial rule, where vestiges of colonial domination are a sensitive subject. Following centuries of English rule in Ireland, Douglas Hyde delivered an argument for de-anglicisation before the Irish National Literary Society in Dublin, 25 November 1892: "When we speak of 'The Necessity for De-Anglicising the Irish Nation', we mean it, not as a protest against imitating what is best in the English people, for that would be absurd, but rather to show the folly of neglecting what is Irish, and hastening to adopt, pell-mell, and, indiscriminately, everything that is English, simply because it is English."

In some cases, a place name might appear anglicised compared with the most widely used name, but the form being used in English is actually the borrowing of an older or different form that has since been changed. For example, Turin in the Piedmont region of Italy is named Turin in the native Piedmontese language, but is known as Torino in Italian.

== Personal names ==
The translation of personal names used to be common, e.g. Copernicus rather than Kopernik. According to The Economist, the tradition 'seems to belong to another era'. The Universitat Oberta de Catalunya style guide for example recommends not translating the names of contemporary royalty, but does recommend translating papal names. Furthermore, names written in the Latin alphabet should be written according to the spelling conventions of the native language, including reasonable diacritics. They say names written in other scripts should still be anglicised.

=== Immigrant names ===
During the time in which there were large influxes of immigrants from Europe to the United States and United Kingdom during the 19th and 20th centuries, the names of many immigrants were never changed by immigration officials (as demonstrated in The Godfather Part II).

The anglicisation of a personal name now usually depends on the preferences of the bearer. Name changes are less common today for Europeans emigrating to the United States than they are for people originating in East Asian countries (except for Japan, which no longer has large-scale emigration). However, unless the spelling is changed, European immigrants put up with (and in due course accept) an anglicised pronunciation: "Lewinsky" will be so pronounced, unless the "w" becomes a "v", as in "Levi". "Głowacki" will be pronounced "Glowacki" (/ɡloʊˈækiː/), even though in Polish pronunciation it is "Gwovatski" ([ɡwɔˈvat͡ski]). "Weinstein" is usually pronounced with different values for the two "-ein-" parts (/ˈwaɪnstiːn/). American NFL coach Steve Spagnuolo's family name, which contains no phonetic [ɡ] in the original Italian, is pronounced not with a semblance of the palatal /ɲɲ/ represented by the digraph <gn> in Italian, but with fully occlusive /ɡ/ followed by /n/, enabling his nickname Spags, also with /ɡ/.

== See also ==
- Anglicisation of names
- Anglicism – Word or construction peculiar to or borrowed from the English language
- English-speaking world
- Englishisation – English influence on other languages
- English terms with diacritical marks
- Linguistic purism in English
