= Polish Institute and Sikorski Museum =

Learned society in London UK

Coordinates: 51°30′5″N 0°10′24″W

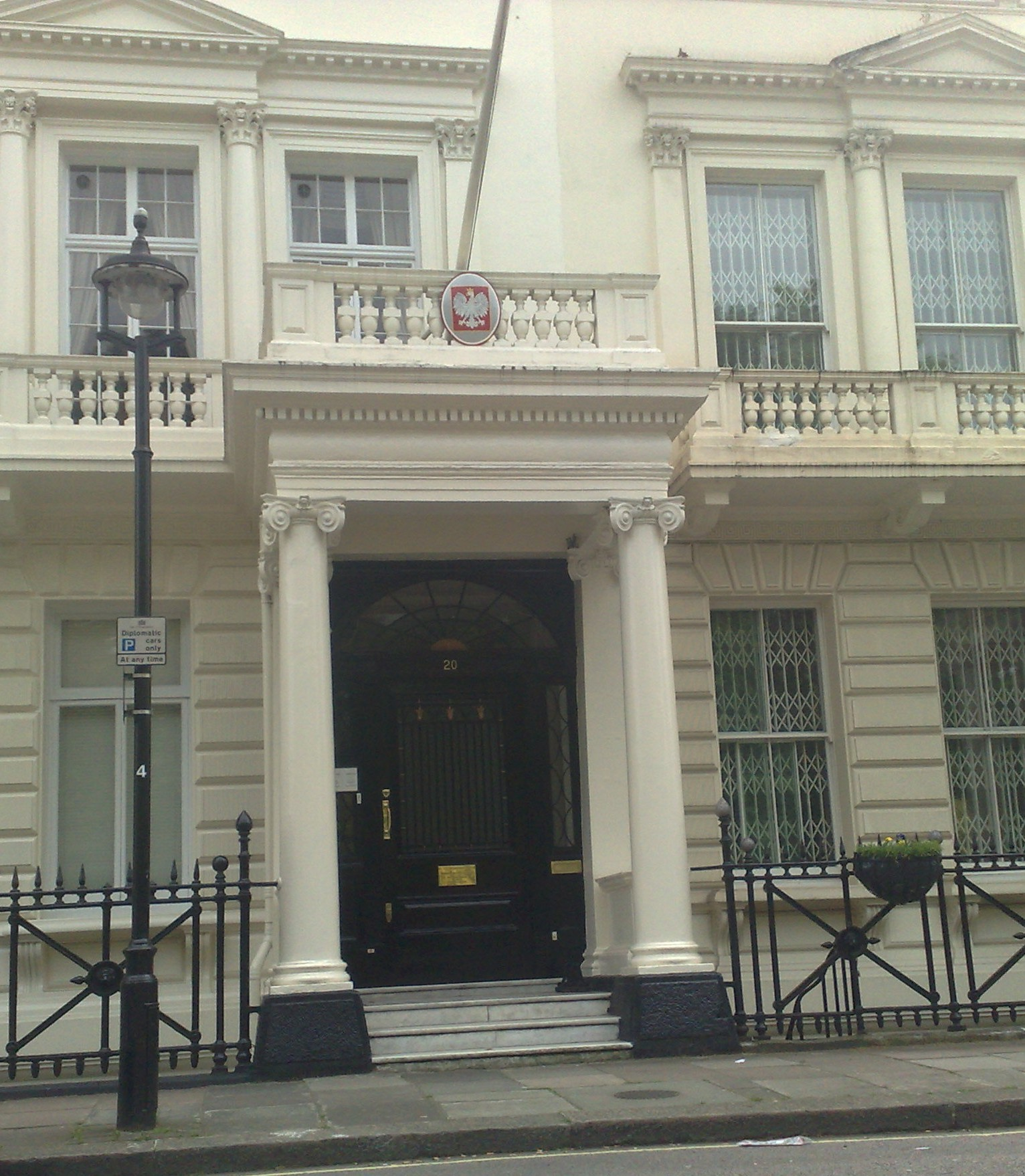
- Polish Institute and Skorski Museum, main entrance
- Formation: 2 May 1945
- Type: Learned society
- Registration no.: 312168
- Legal status: Registered charity
- Purpose: Archival, educational, historical, and museological
- Headquarters: 20 Prince's Gate, London, SW7 1PT
- Services: Research and publications, lectures and events, heritage conservation, and exhibitions
- Chairman: Danuta Bildziuk
- Head of Archives: Andrzej Suchcitz
- Website: www.pism.org.uk

The Polish Institute and Sikorski Museum (Polish: Instytut Polski i Muzeum im. Gen. Sikorskiego), known as Sikorski Institute, named after General Władysław Sikorski, is a leading London-based museum and archive for research into Poland during World War II and the Polish diaspora. It is a non-governmental organisation managed by scholars from the Polish community in the United Kingdom, housed at 20 Prince's Gate in West London, in a Grade II listed terrace on Kensington Road facing Hyde Park. It is incidentally part of the same Victorian development by Charles James Freake as the nearby Polish Hearth Club. Although the institute is closer to the commercial centres of Kensington, it is just within the City of Westminster. In 1988 it merged with the formerly independent Polish Underground Movement (1939–1945) Study Trust – (Polish: Studium Polski Podziemnej w Londynie).

== Origins ==
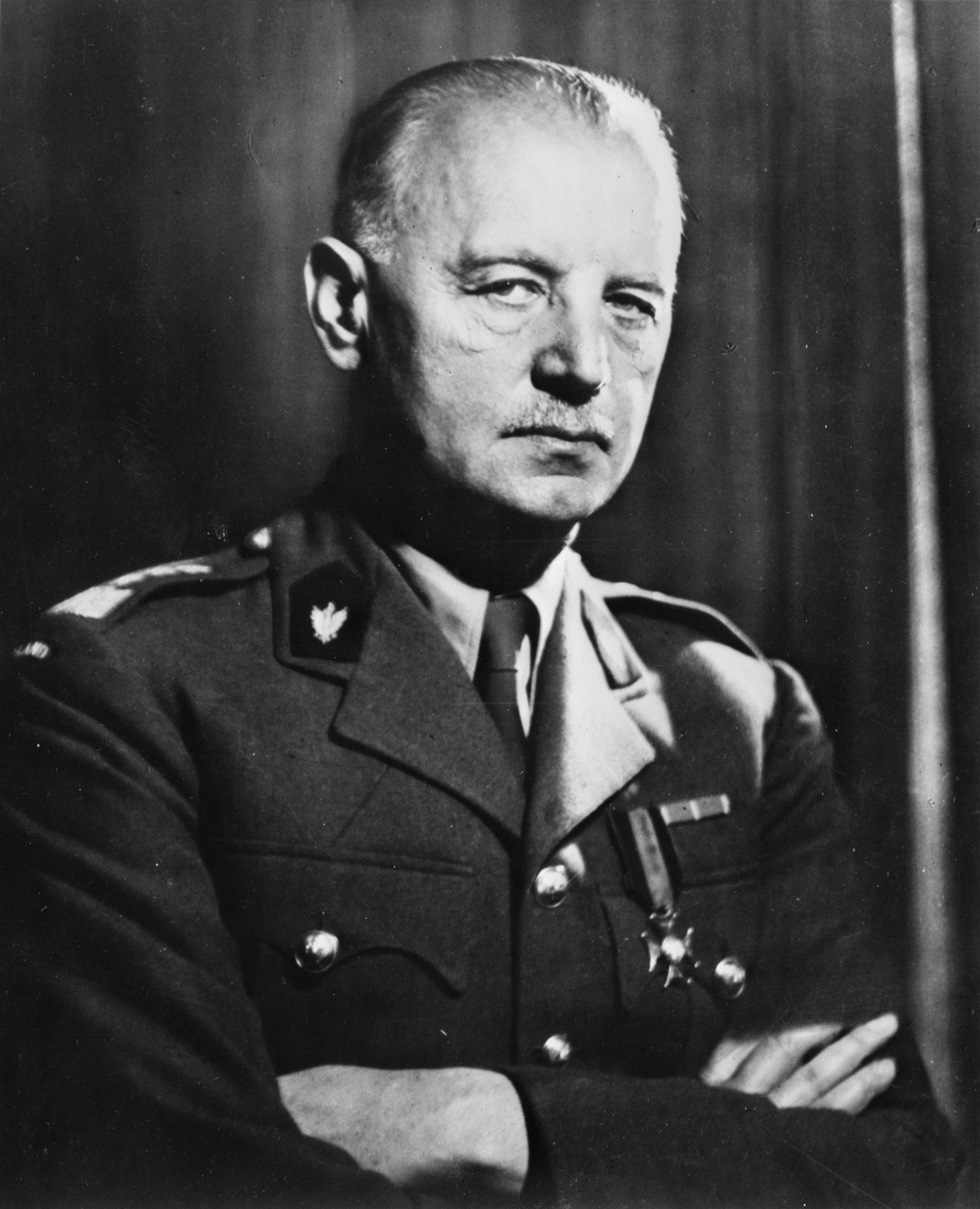
Władysław Sikorski, prime minister of Poland

It was created immediately on the conclusion of the Second World War, on 2 May 1945, to preserve the memory of the Polish Underground State in Occupied Poland, its links to the Polish government-in-exile initially in France then in London, the Polish armed forces in the West and their contribution to World War II. At that time the communist takeover of Poland made it hazardous if not impossible for many exiled Polish ex-servicemen and civilians to return to their native country, after one third of Poland's territory was ceded to the Soviet Union under the Yalta Accords and the native Polish civilian population killed or forcibly deported. It is also a research centre and museum and publisher of historical issues which were either banned or censored in the then People's Republic of Poland.

=== Activities ===
The institute has conserved historical records, including witness records from the Warsaw Uprising in 1944, documents, regimental colours, military medals, uniforms, insignia, works of art, a library and many personal effects which had once belonged to Polish statesmen, diplomats, academics, military leaders and ordinary men and women. The institute's unrivalled film and photographic archive of over 5,000 photographs was digitised by Karta during 2005–6 and is available in Poland for exhibitions and educational initiatives. Around 2006 the institute received a chance find of 2,000 photographs taken by photographer Jan Markiewicz of the early Polish community in 1950s South London, which a passer-by retrieved from a skip in Brixton.

=== Study Trust of the Polish Underground State ===
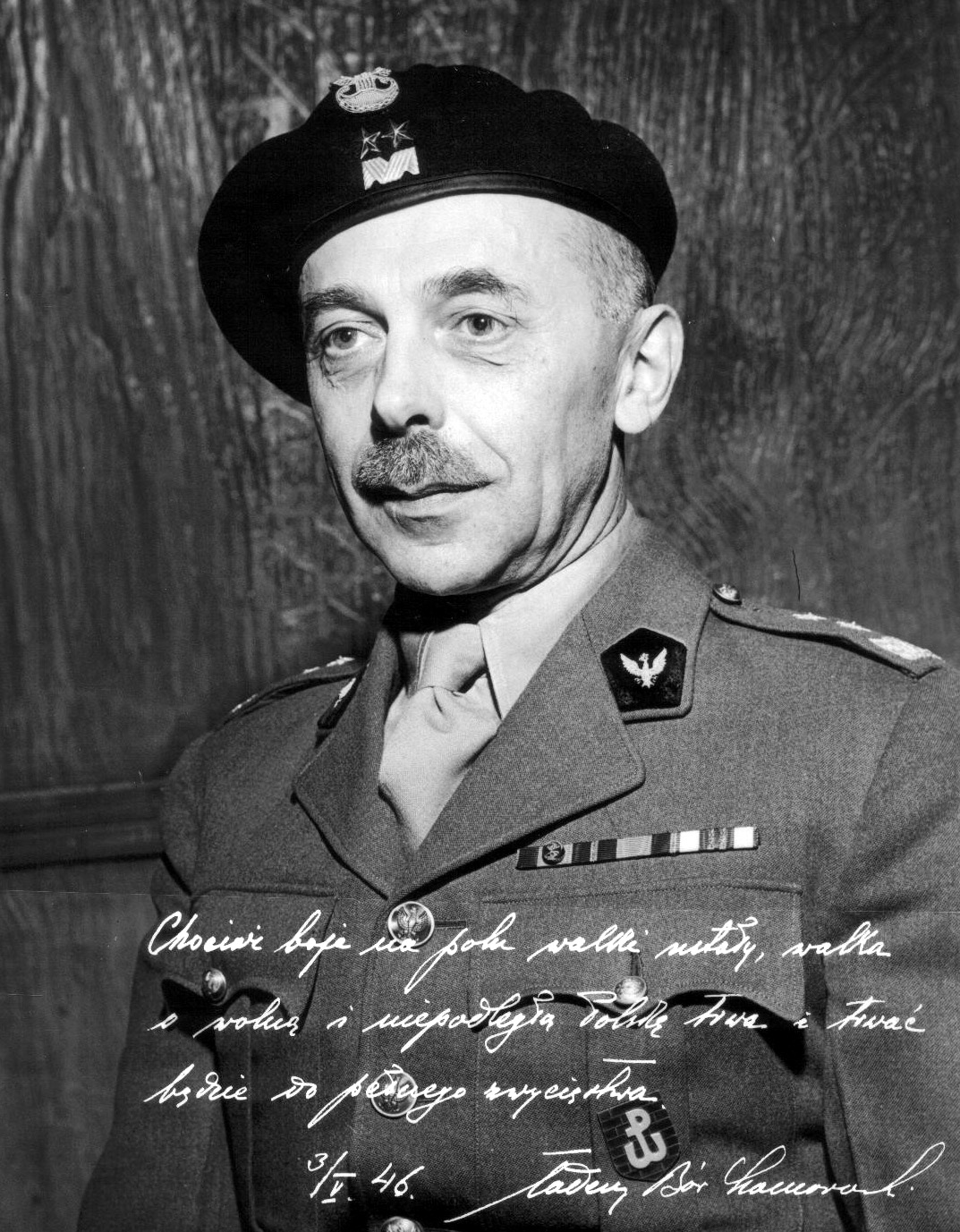
Tadeusz Bór-Komorowski 4th prime minister of the Polish government-in-exile

Founded in 1948, by a group of veterans led by general Tadeusz Bór-Komorowski the Polish Underground Movement (1939–1945) Study Trust – Studium Polski Podziemnej w Londynie, known as the Studium, amalgamated with the institute in 1988. Although it lost its separate legal status, it was granted internal autonomy to carry out its own research and publications from its base in Ealing.

== Governance ==
The Polish Institute and Sikorski Museum is divided into the following departments and sections:

- Archives
- Museum, including the Photographic Archive, the Film Archive and the Sound Archive
- Reference Library
- Administration
- Publications
- Regimental Colours Fund

The institute is governed by a council which elects the executive committee from among its members who run the day-to-day business of the institute. The chairman heads the council and executive committee. Membership consists of honorary members (nominated by the AGM), full members chosen by the council, life members by single donation and annual members.

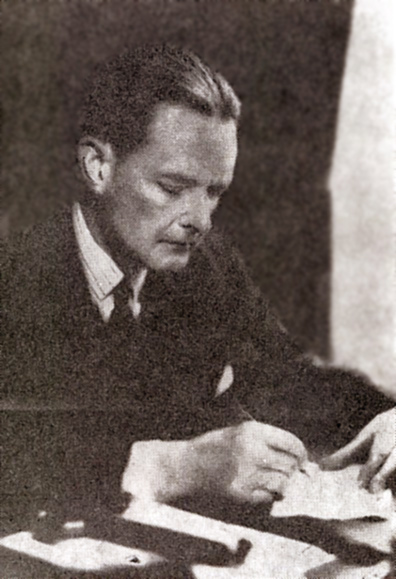
Count Edward Raczynski Polish Ambassador to the Court of St James's 1932–1941

Since its inception, the institute has had eight chairmen:

- Prof. Stanisław Stroński PhD (1945–1951)
- Lt. Gen. Prof. Marian Kukiel PhD (1951-c.1965)
- Count Edward Raczyński PhD (c.1965–1976)
- Stanisław Leśniowski MSc (1977–1979)
- Capt. Ryszard Dembiński (1979–2004)
- Krzysztof Barbarski CEng (2004–2022)
- Krzysztof deBerg (2022 -2023 )
- Danuta Bildzuik (2023 - )

== See also ==
- History of Poland (1939–45)
- Polish government in exile
- Poles in the United Kingdom
- Polish Library in Paris
- Polish Museum, Rapperswil
- Institute of National Remembrance

== Bibliography ==
- "Documents on Polish-Soviet Relations, 1939–1945", General Sikorski Historical Institute, London: Heinemann. 1967.
- Milewski, Waclaw. Suchcitz, Andrzej. Gorczycki, Andrzej. (Eds.) "Guide to the Archives of the Polish Institute and Sikorski Museum". 1985
- Suchcitz, Andrzej. O Instytucie Polskim i Muzeum im. gen. Sikorskiego w Londynie, Pamiętnik Literacki, tom XIII, Londyn 1988 – About the Polish Institute and Sikorski Museum in London, a Memoire (in Polish).
- Suchcitz, Andrzej. Powstanie Instytutu Historycznego im gen. Sikorskiego, [w:] Idea Europy i Polska w XIX-XX wieku, Towarzystwo Przyjaciół Ossolineum, Wrocław 1999 – The creation of the Historical Sikorski Institute in "The Idea of Europe and Poland in the 19th and 20th centuries". Association of the Friends of the Ossolineum. (in Polish).
- Orr, Aileen (2012). Wojtek the Bear: Polish War Hero. Edinburgh: Birlinn Publishers. ISBN 978-1-84341-057-7.

== Gallery ==
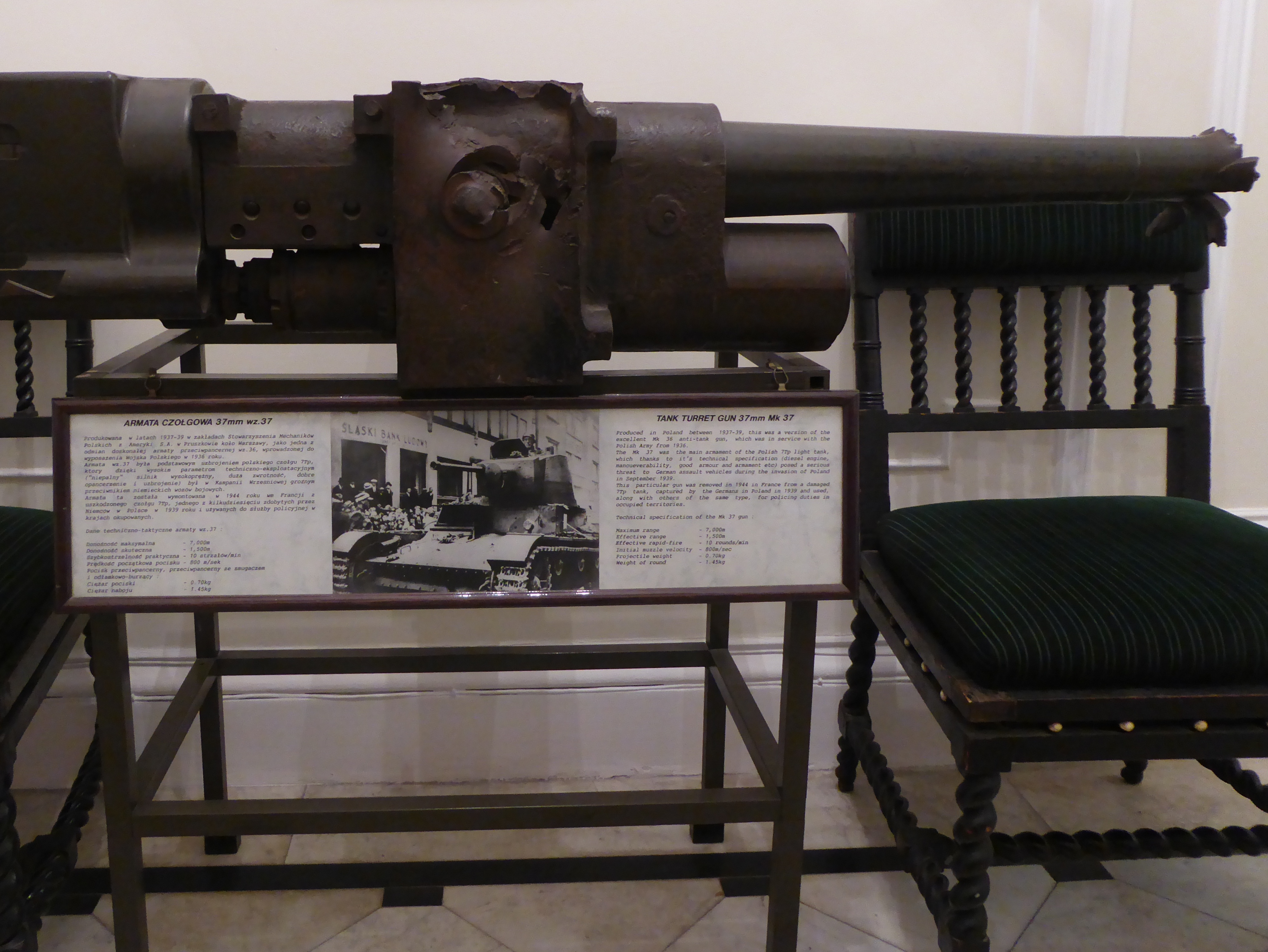
A turret gun from a Polish 7TP light tank which was used against the invading Germans in September 1939. It was later employed by the Germans in France and recovered during the allied invasion of western Europe in 1944.

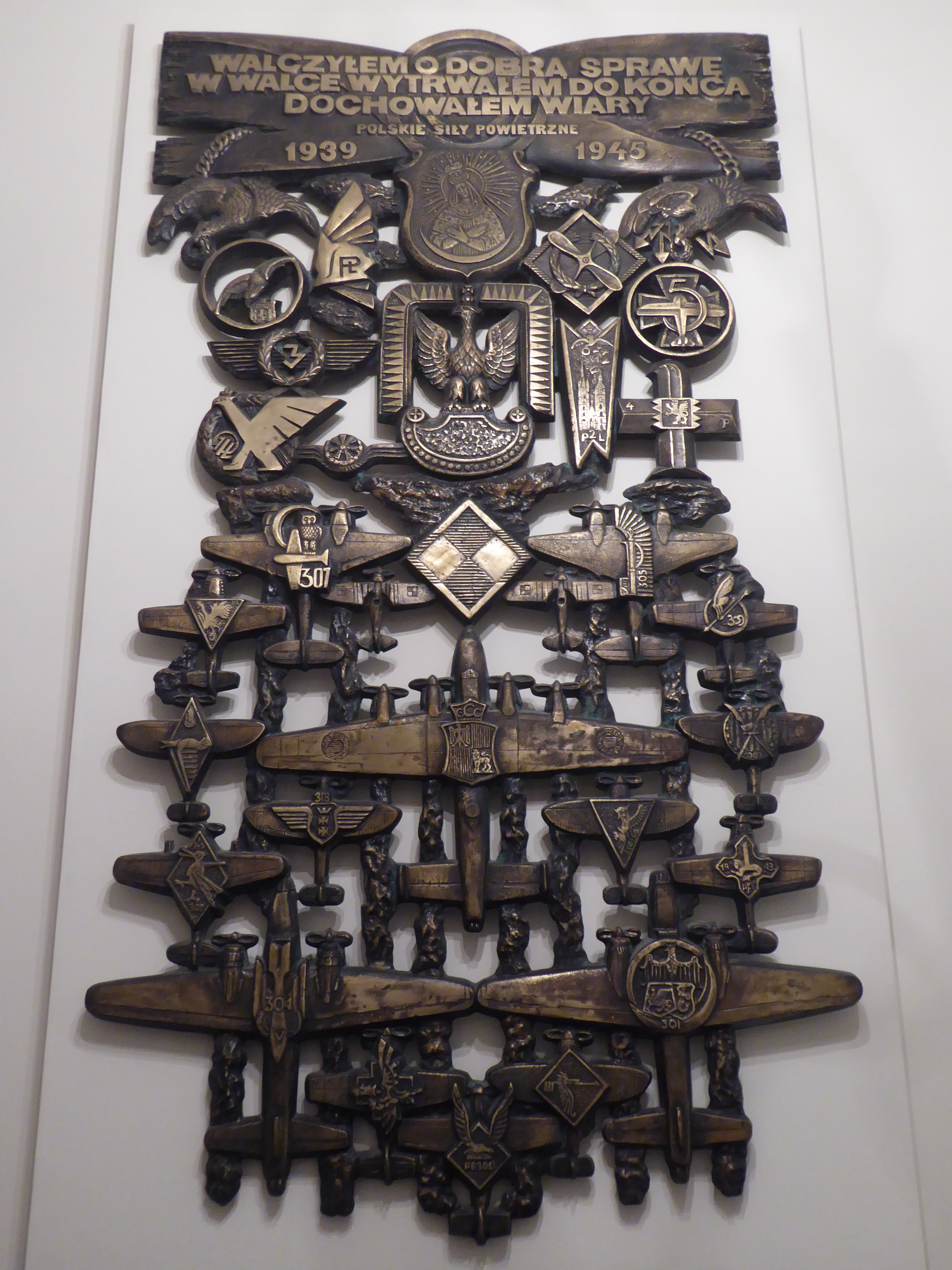
A memorial to the Polish pilots who fought in World War 2

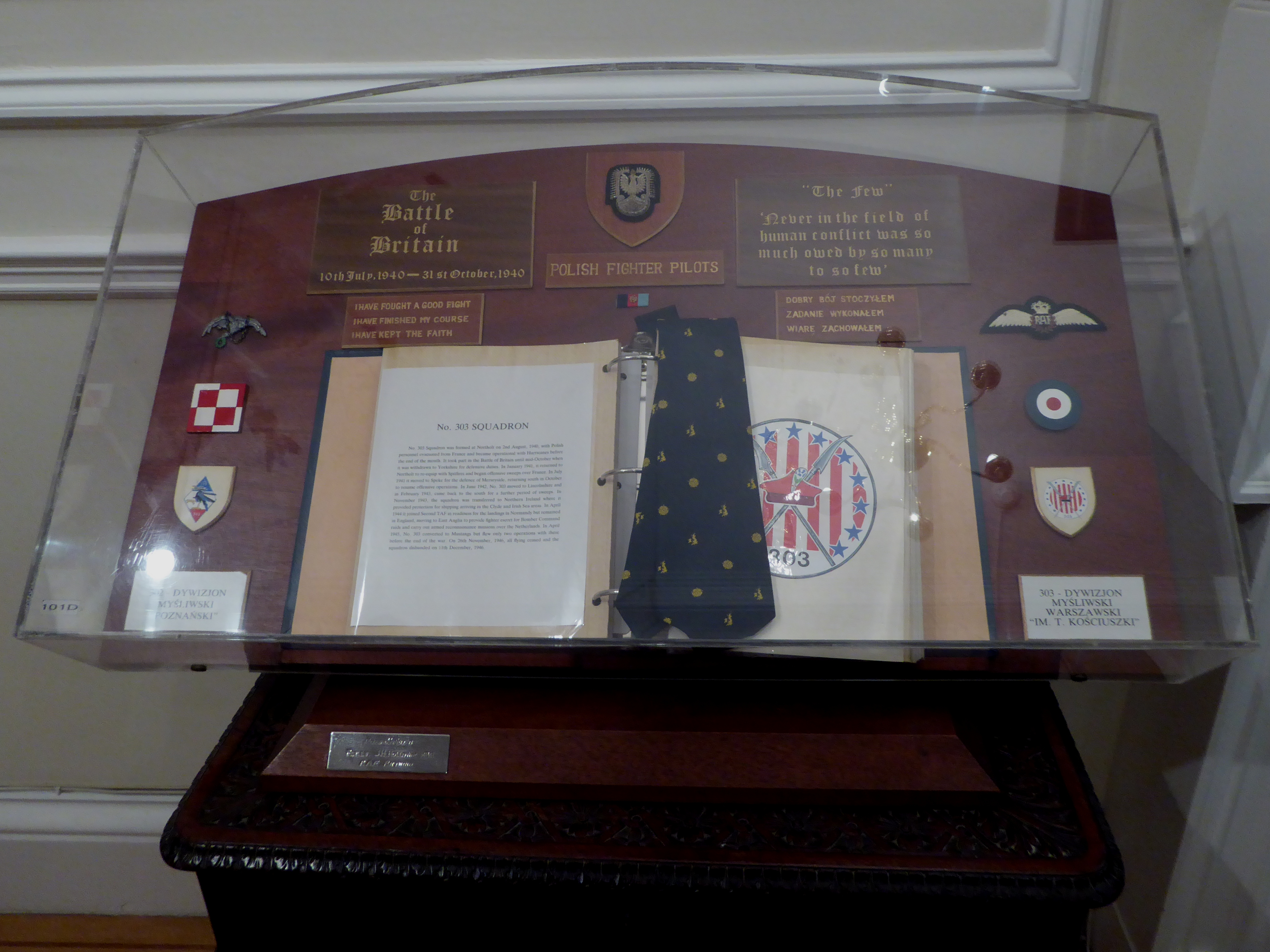
An exhibit about the Polish contribution to the Battle of Britain

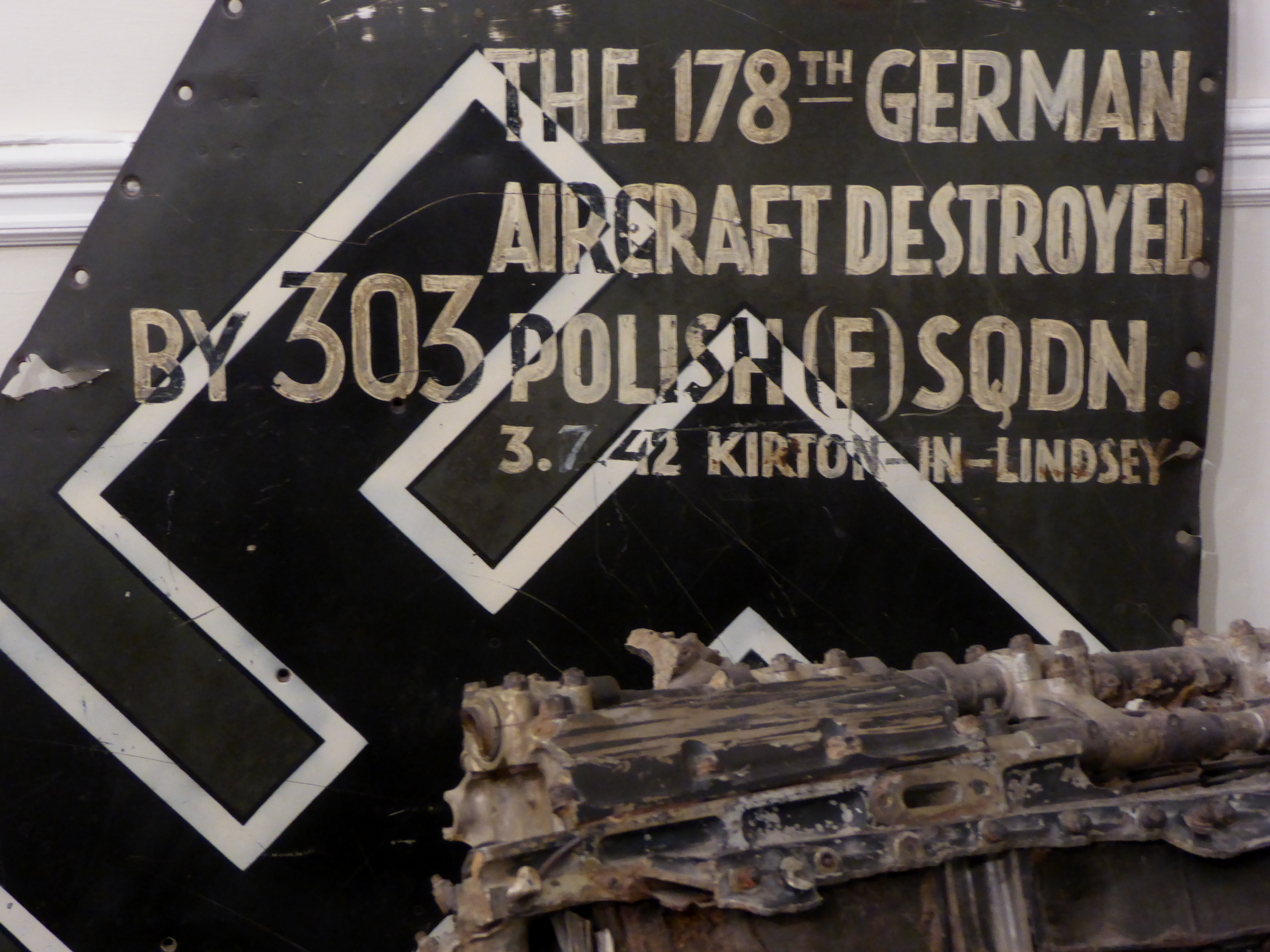
Remains of the 178th German plane shot down by the Polish 303 squadron during the Battle of Britain

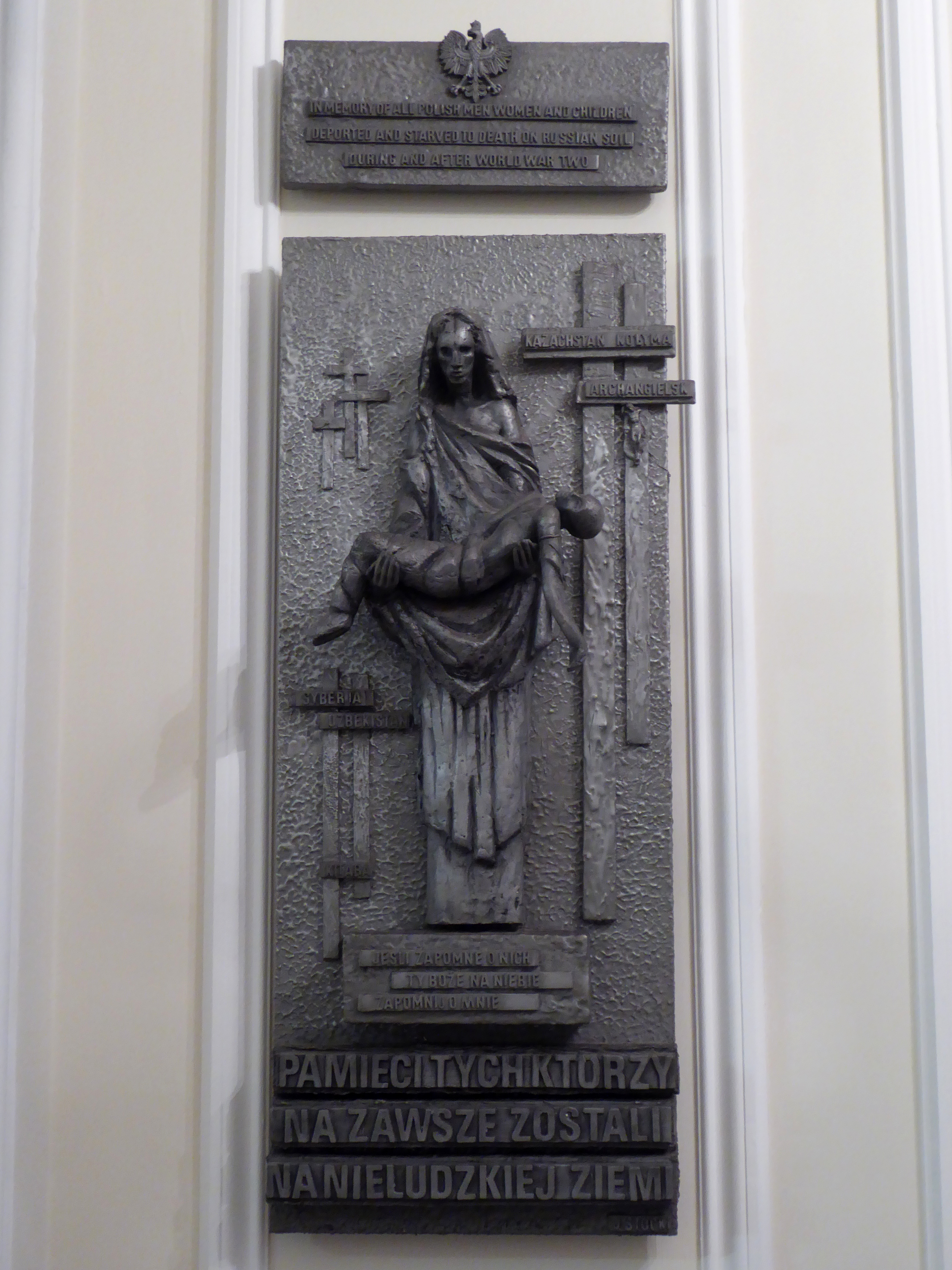
A memorial to the thousands of Polish men, women and children deported and starved to death on Russian soil during and after World War 2

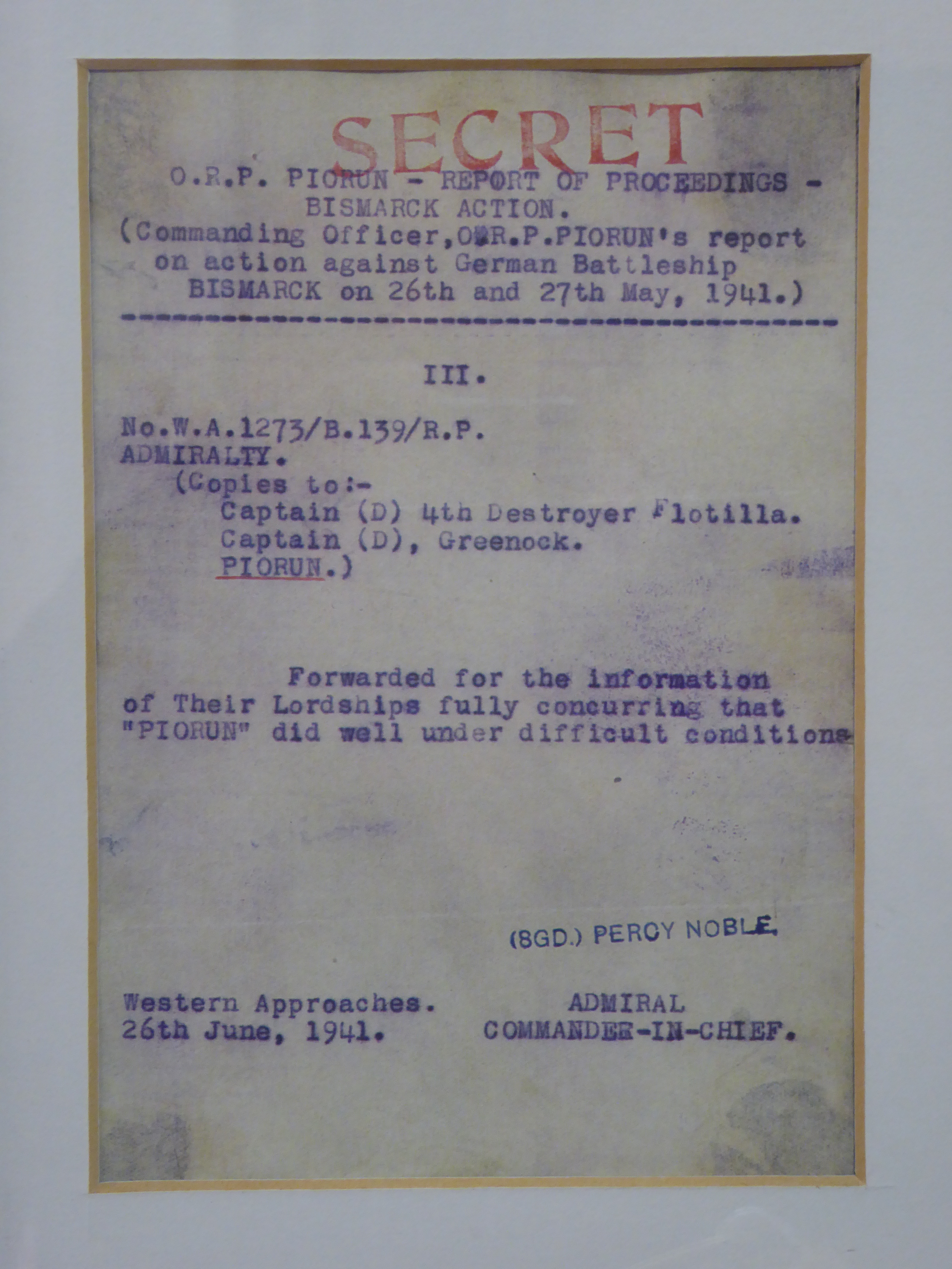
A report commending the actions of the Polish destroyer Piorun ("Thunderbolt") prior to the sinking of the Bismarck

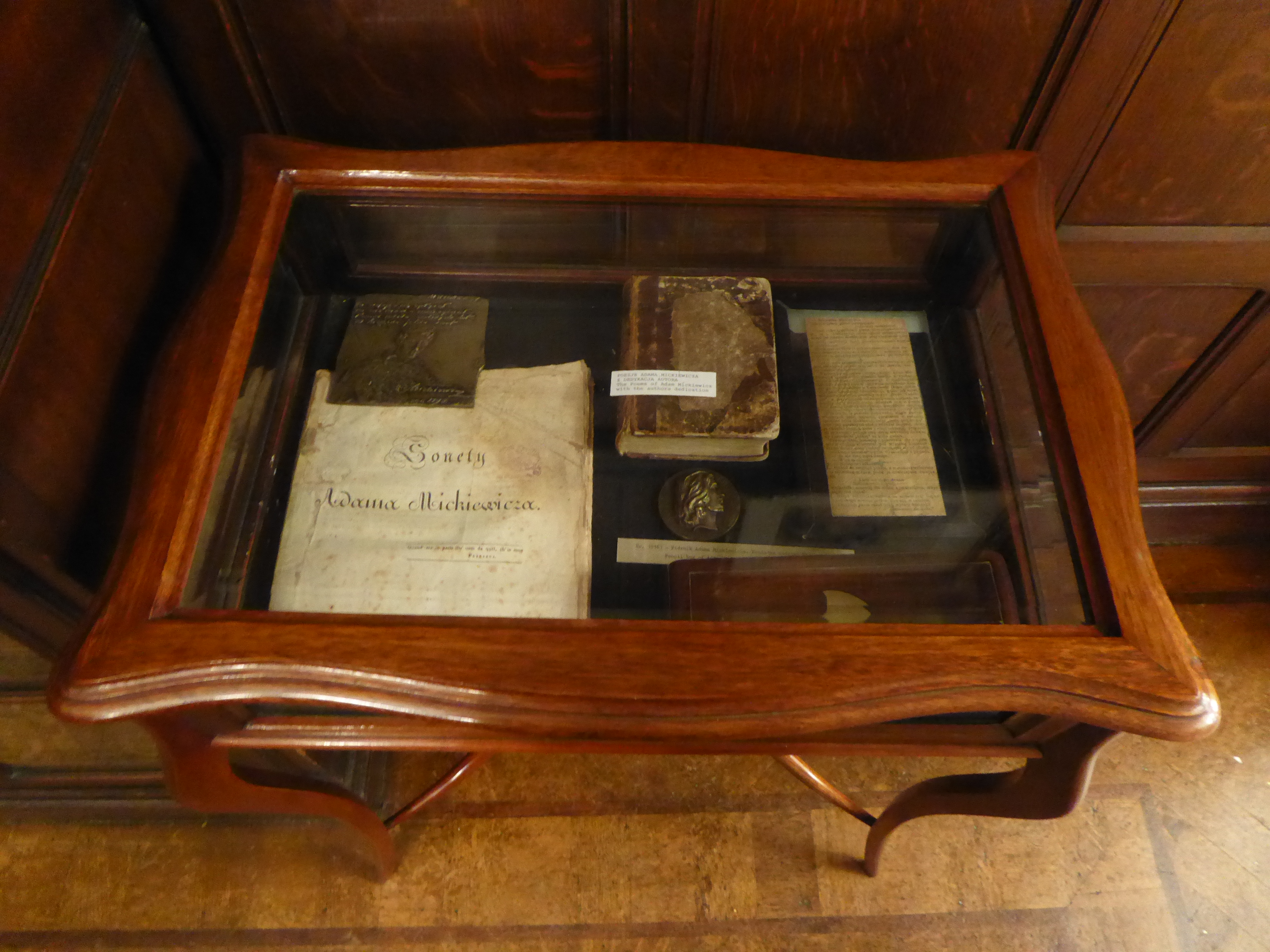
Original manuscripts by Polish poet Adam Mickiewicz

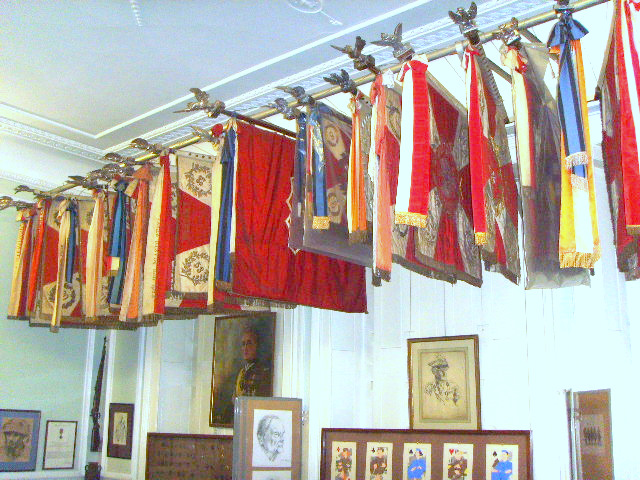
Regimental colours

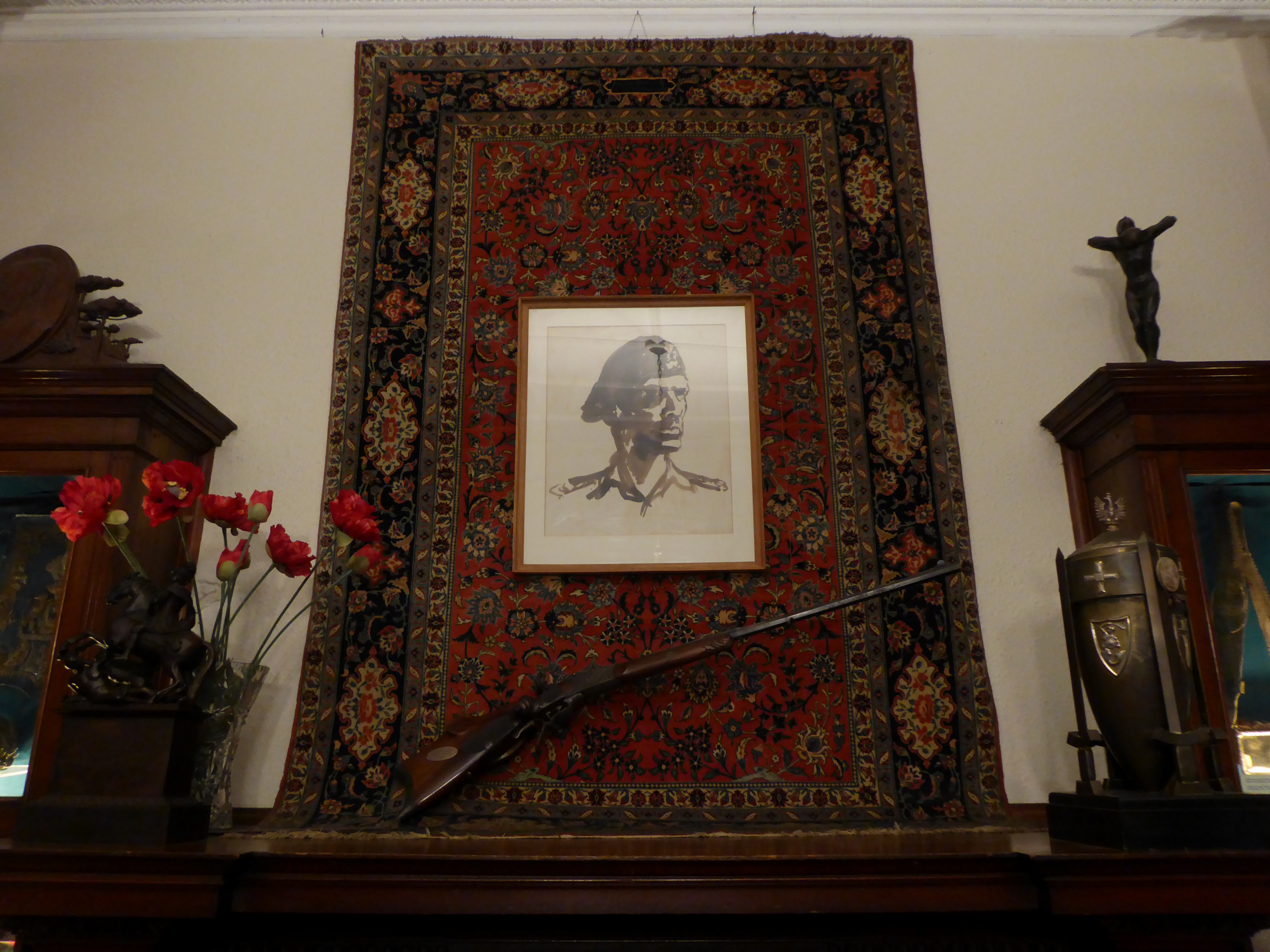
The Władysław Anders room

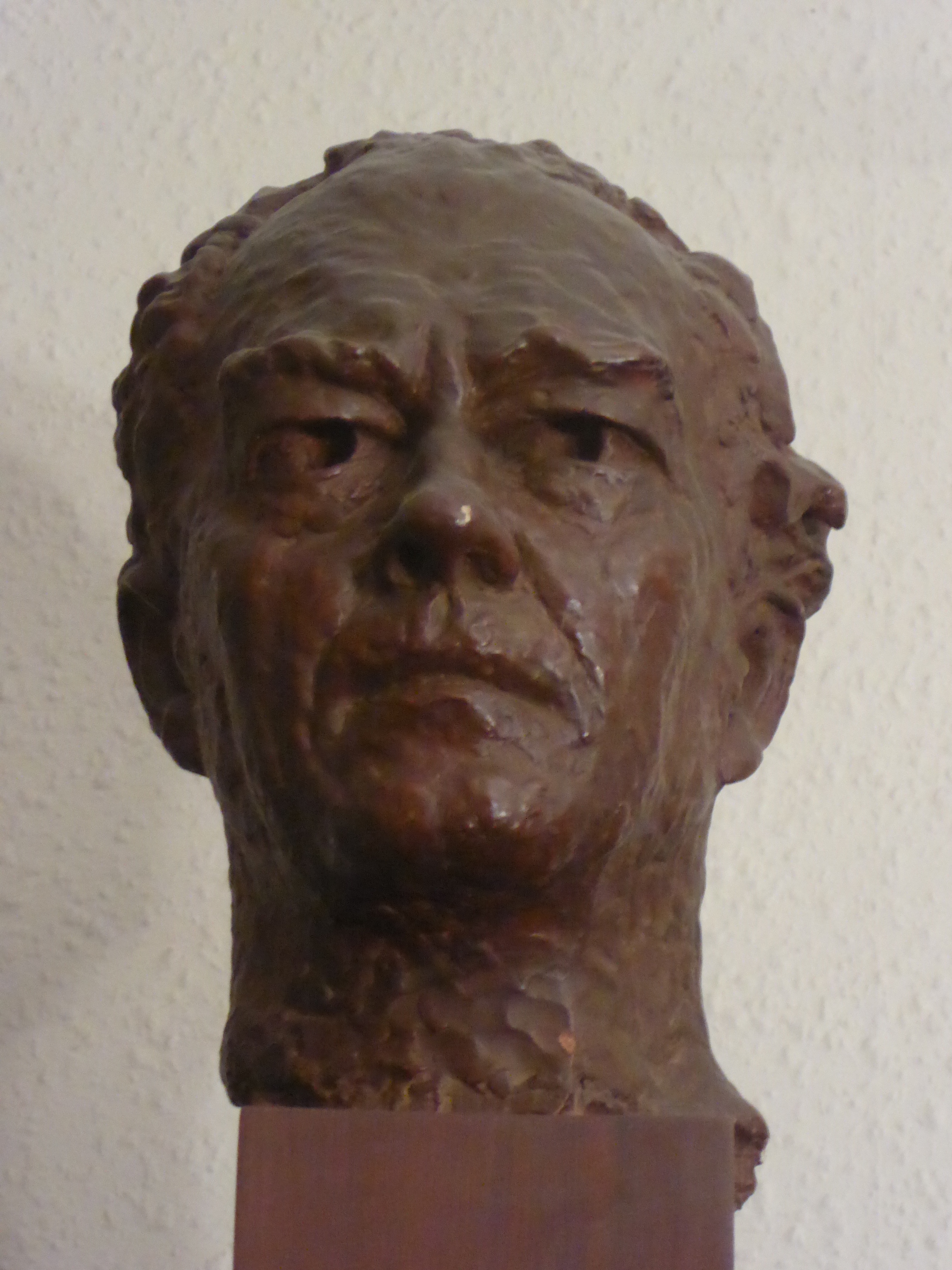
A bust of Władysław Anders

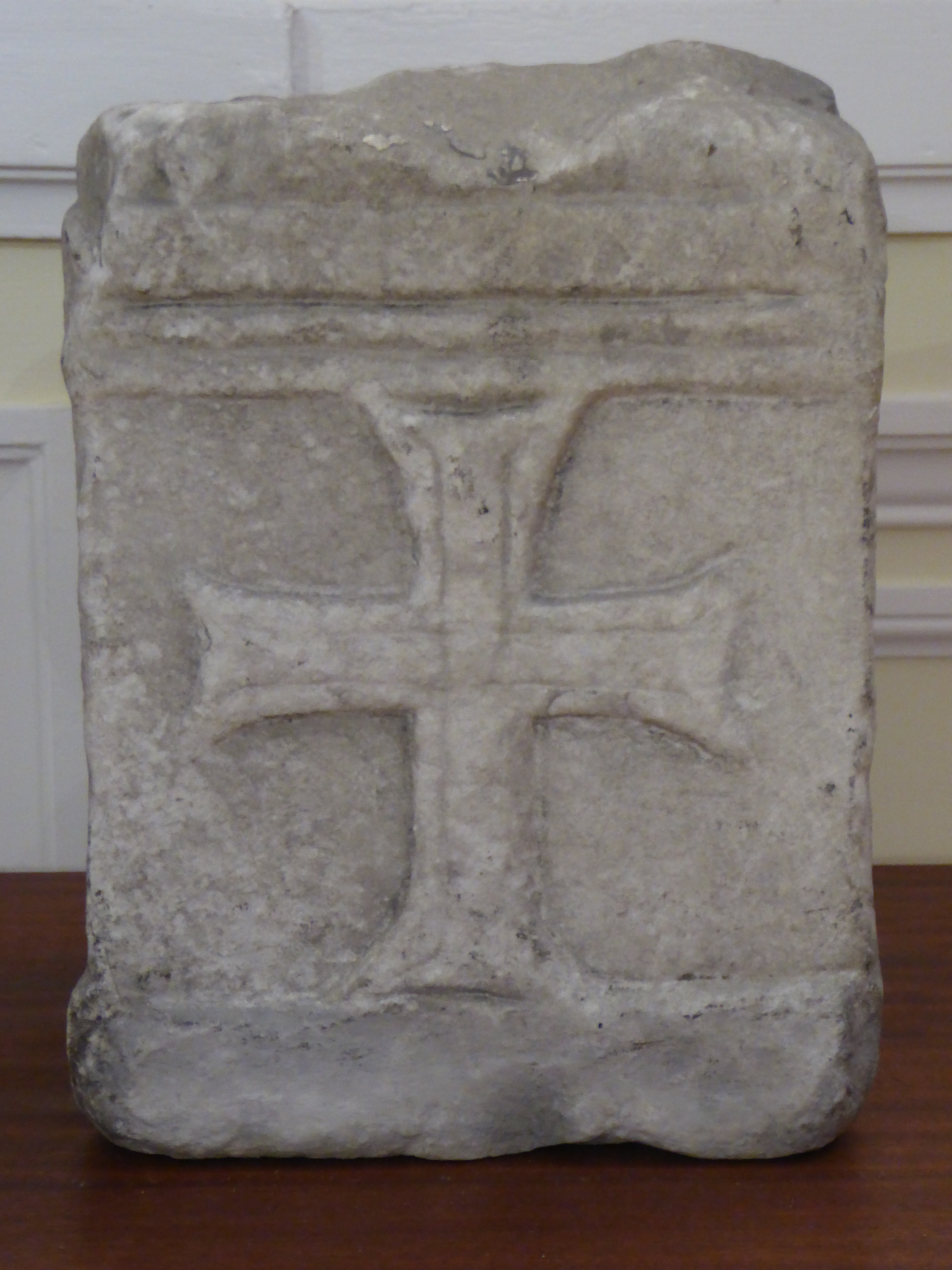
A souvenir from the Battle of Monte Cassino

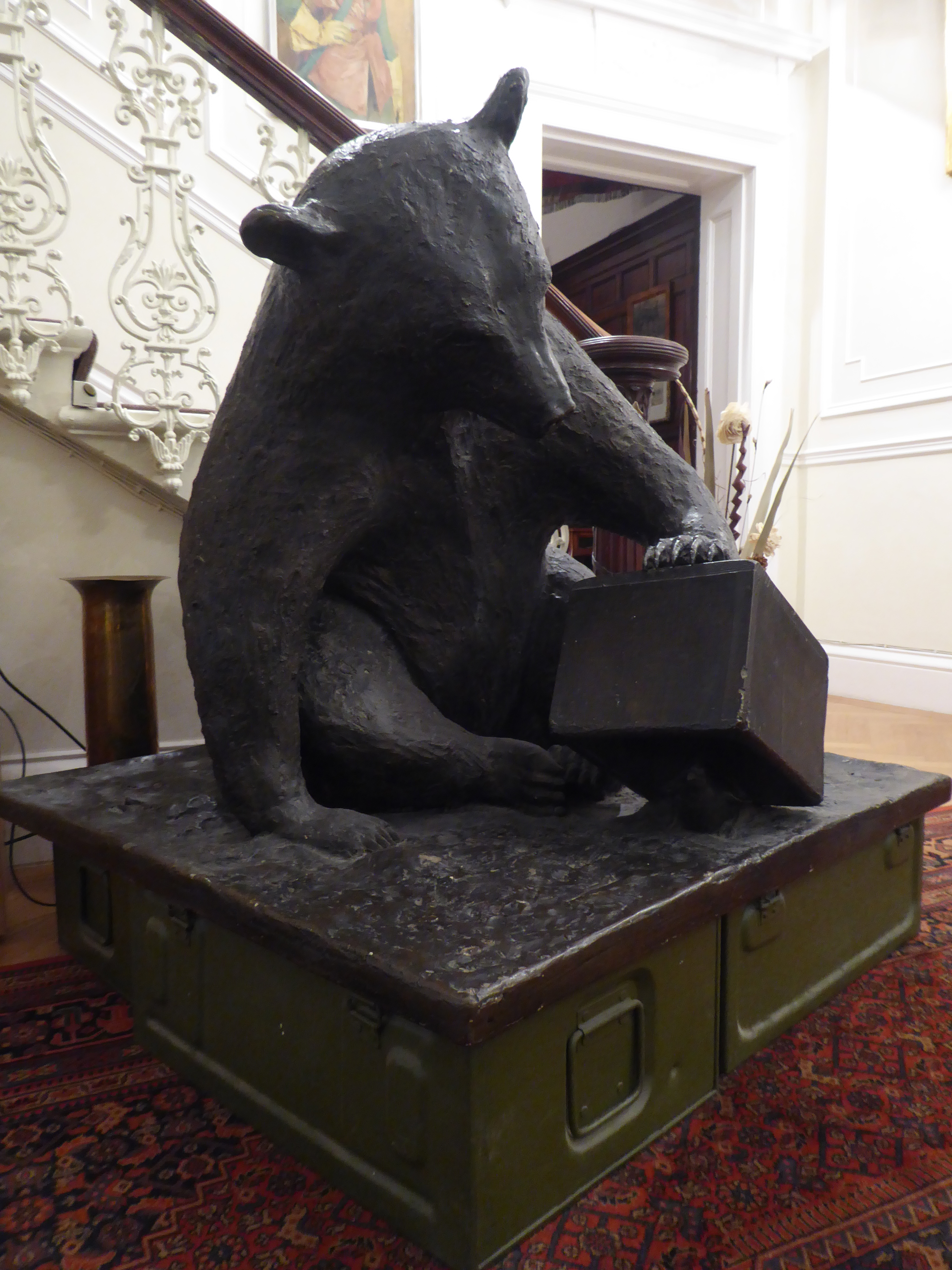
A sculpture of Wojtek the soldier bear by David Harding

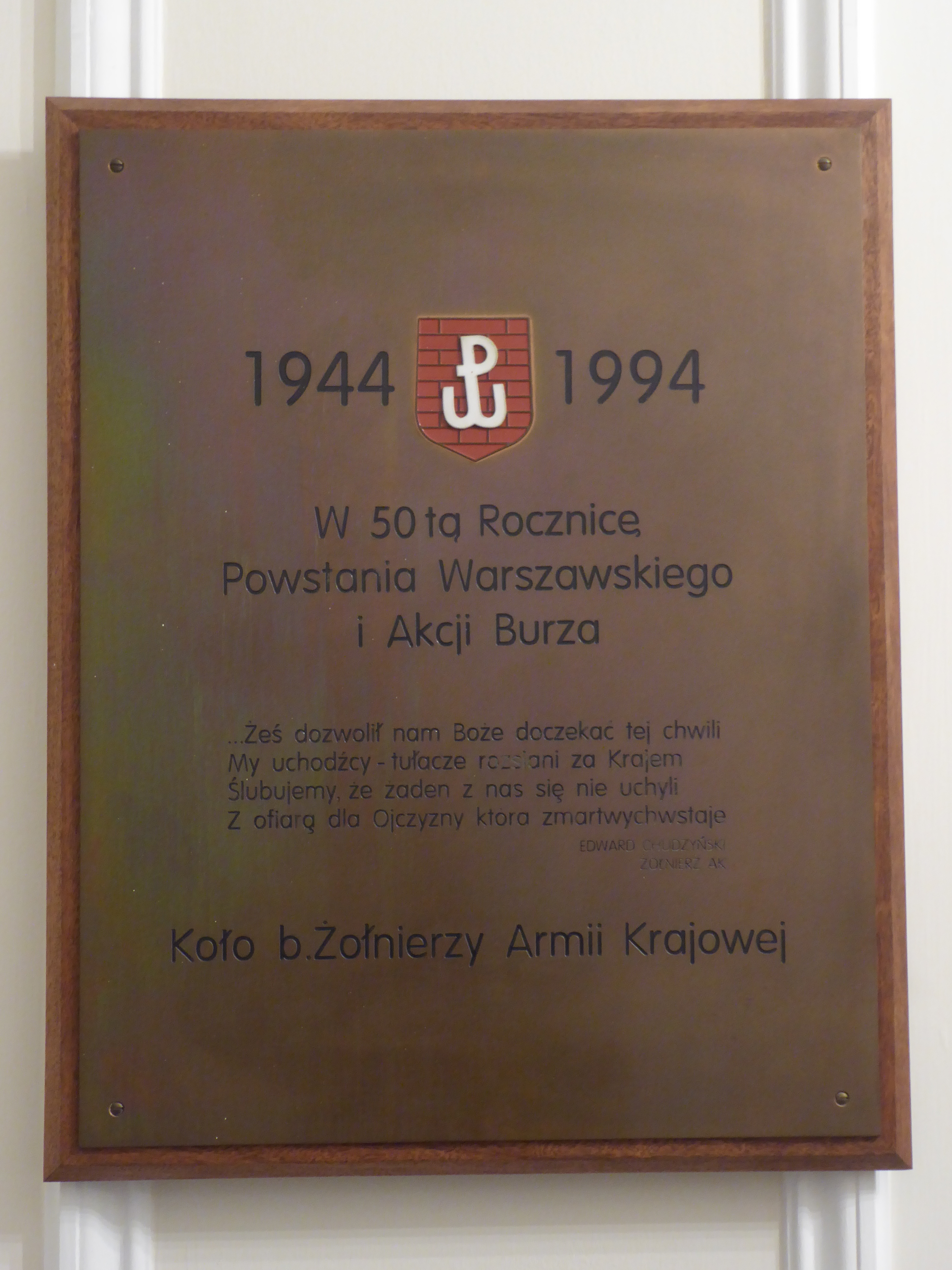
A plaque commemorating the 50th anniversary of the Warsaw Uprising and Operation Tempest

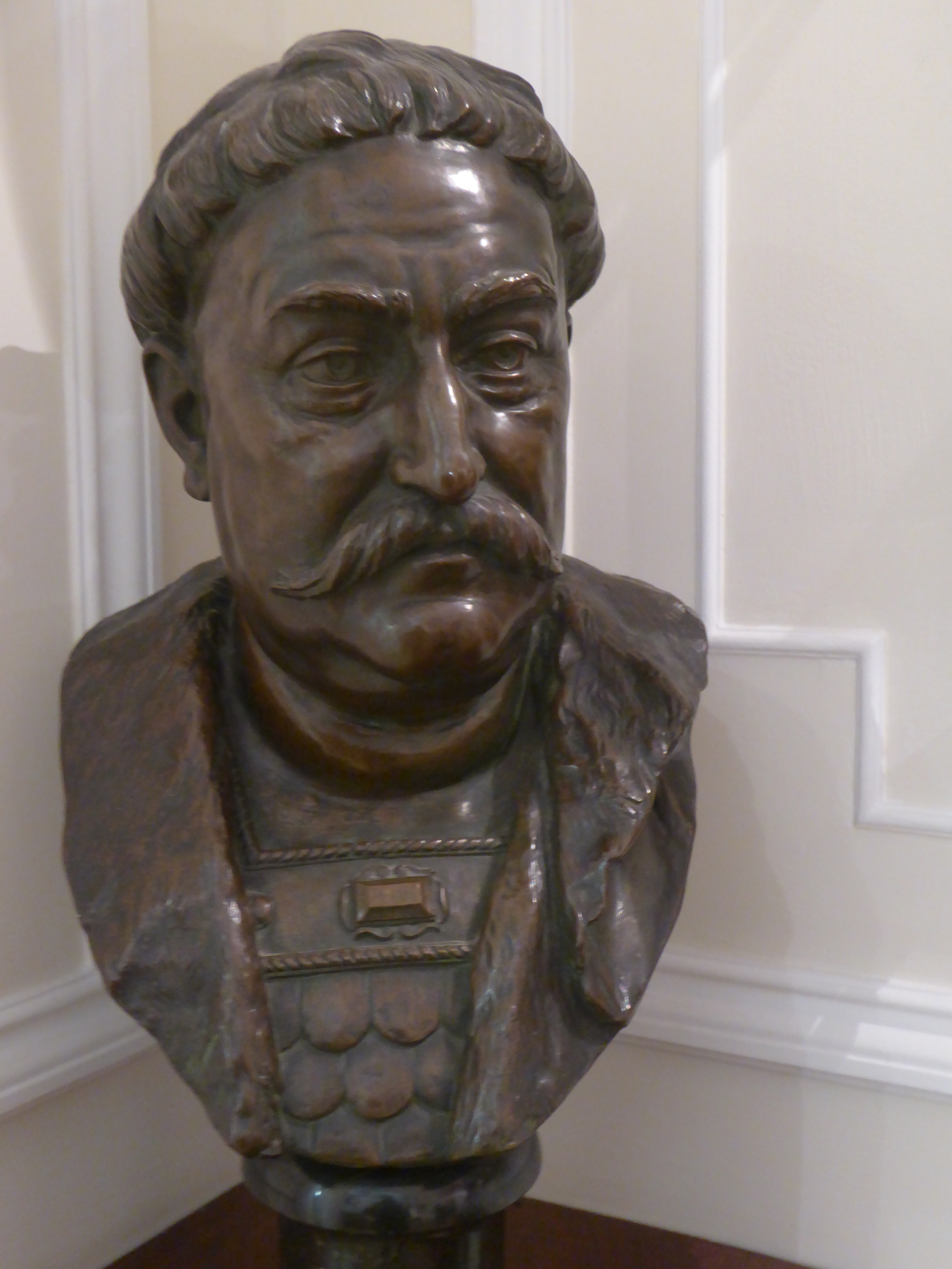
A bust of Jan Sobieski

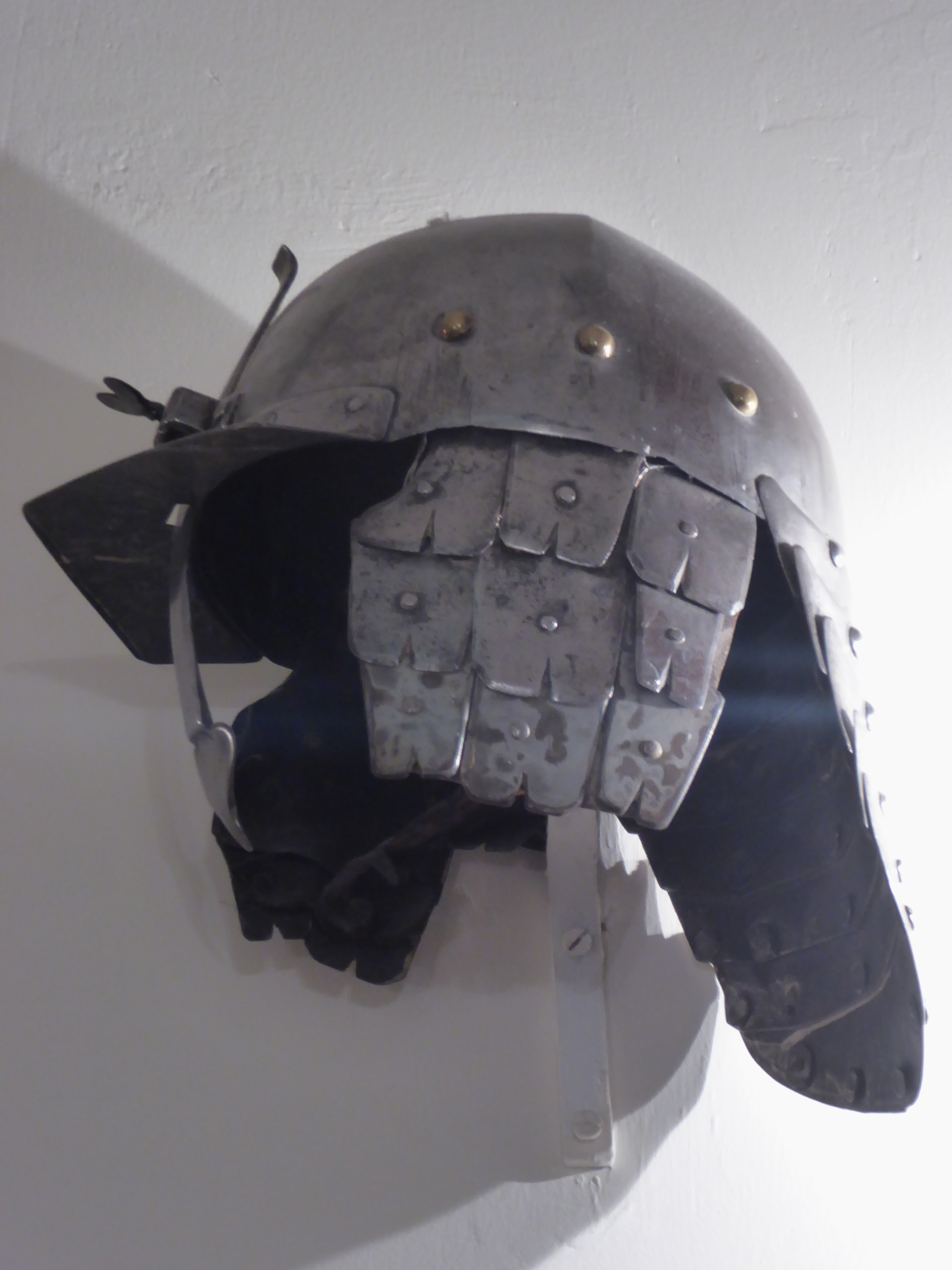
A Polish hussar helmet from the 17th century

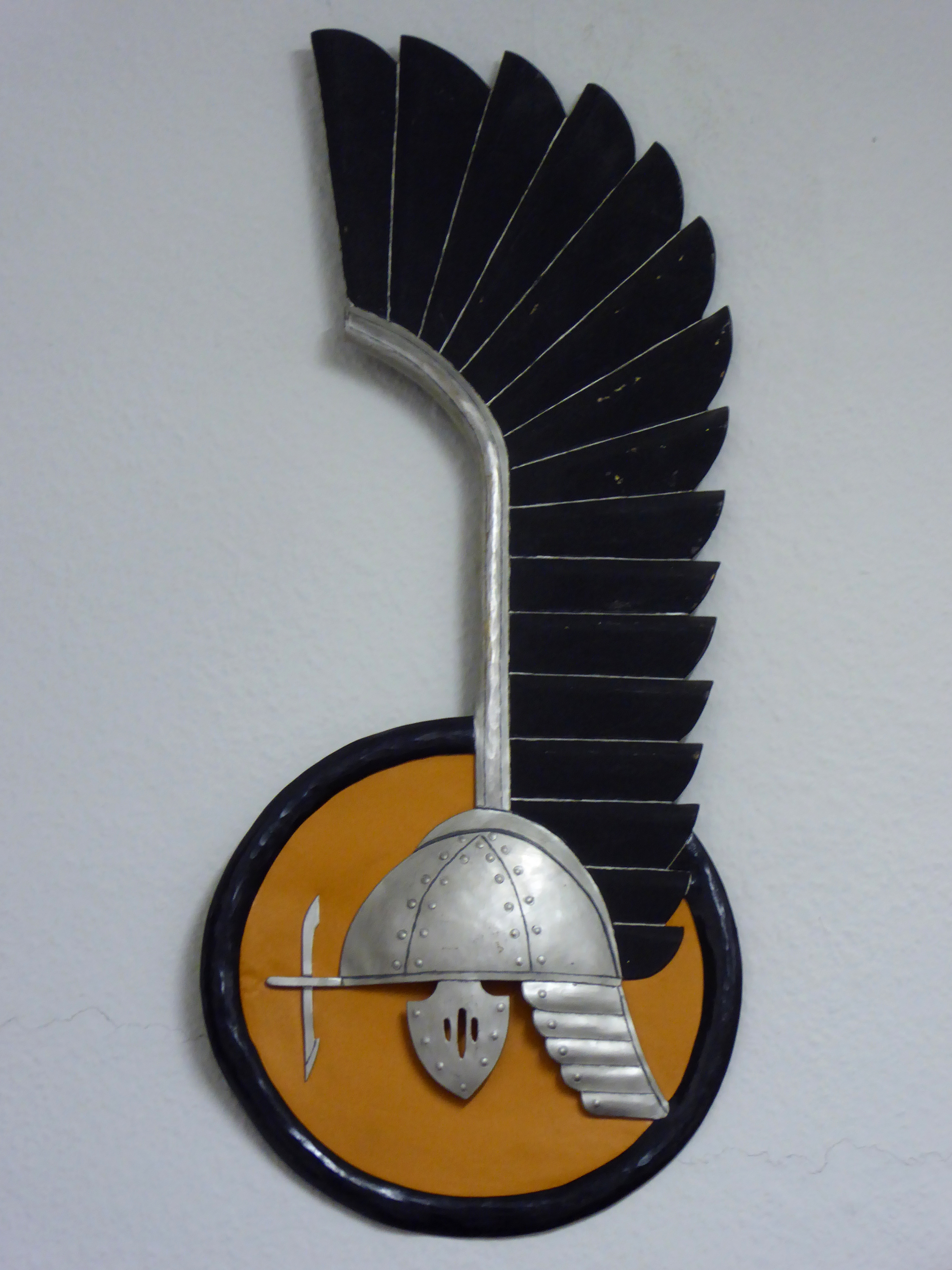
The emblem of the 1st Polish Armoured Division

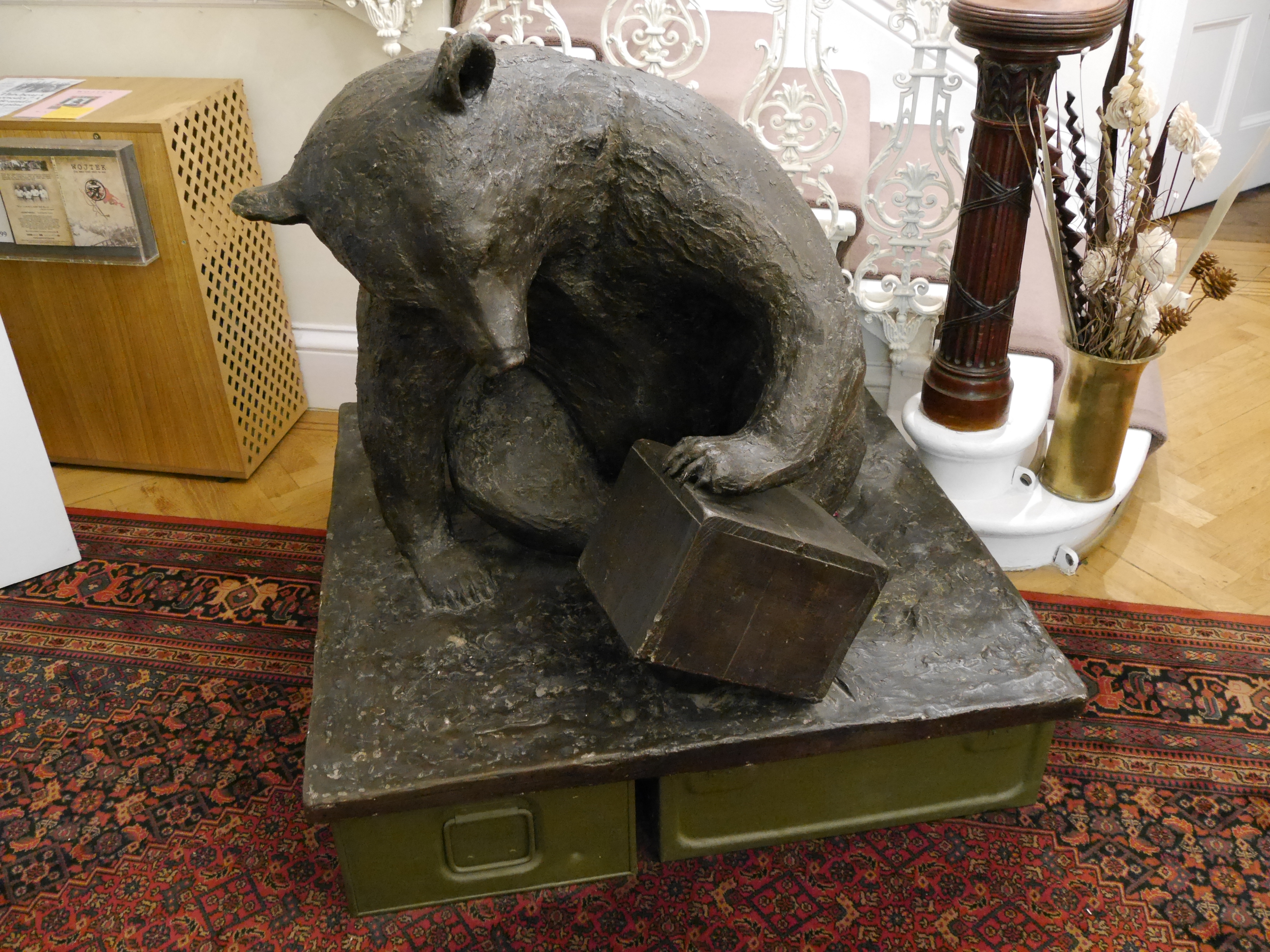
Sculpture by David Harding in the Sikorski Museum, London

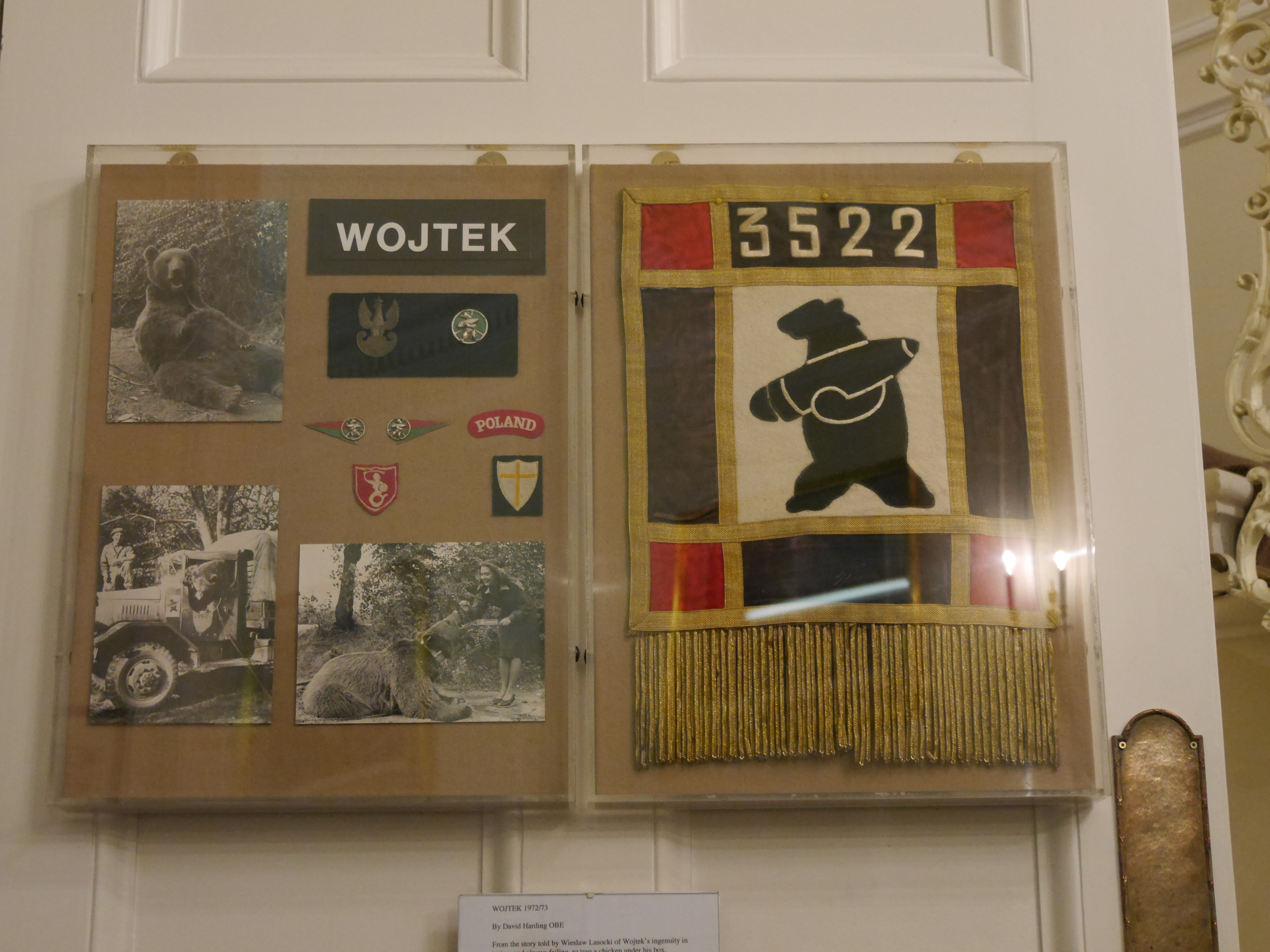
About Wojtek
