= Richárd =

Richárd is a masculine given name. Notable people with the name include:

- Richárd Bicskey (1936–2020), Hungarian cyclist
- Richárd Bodor (born 1979), Hungarian swimmer
- Richárd Bodó (born 1993), Hungarian handball player
- Richárd Bognár, Hungarian sport shooter
- Richárd Bohus (born 1993), Hungarian swimmer
- Richárd Csősz, Hungarian footballer
- Richárd Czár, Hungarian footballer
- Richárd Erdős (1881–1912), Jewish Hungarian bass opera singer
- Richárd Frank, Hungarian footballer
- Richárd Guzmics, Hungarian footballer
- Richárd Hoffmann, Hungarian footballer
- Richárd Horváth, Hungarian footballer
- Richárd Hörcsik (born 1955), Hungarian politician
- Richárd Jelena (born 1998), Hungarian footballer
- Richárd Kovács (born 1997), Hungarian boxer
- Richárd Kozma, Hungarian footballer
- Richárd Mezei (born 1970), Hungarian handball player
- Richárd Márton (born 1999), Hungarian swimmer
- Richárd Nagy (footballer, born 1994), Hungarian footballer
- Richárd Nagy (footballer, born 1995), Hungarian footballer
- Richárd Osváth, Hungarian Paralympic fencer
- Richárd Rapport (born 1996), Hungarian chess grandmaster
- Richárd Rák, Hungarian politician
- Richárd Sipőcz (born 2001), Hungarian judoka
- Richárd Tarnai (born 1972), Hungarian politician
- Richárd Tusori, Hungarian footballer
- Richárd Vernes, Hungarian footballer
- Richárd Weisz (1879–1945), Hungarian Greco-Roman wrestler
- Richárd Zsolnai (born 1995), Hungarian footballer

== See also ==
- Richard
- Ryszard
