= Ryszard Dembiński =

Polish Cavalry officer

- Born: 24 February 1924; Poznań
- Died: 27 June 2008 (aged 84); London
- Occupations: Rotmistrz (1945); Military journalist (1956–2000); Museum chairman (1979–2004)
- Employer(s): Polish Institute and Sikorski Museum (1964–2004)
- Spouse: Wanda Dembińska

Rotmistrz Ryszard Dembiński (born 24 February 1924, Poznań – 29 June 2008, London) was a Polish Cavalry officer and D-Day Veteran, who, following World War II, helped to establish the Polish Institute and Sikorski Museum in London, which he chaired for 25 years (1979–2004).

== Early years ==
Ryszard Dembinski was born in Poznań, the son of a Polish artillery officer, in 1924, which was just six years after Poland had regained its independence after 125 years of partition between Prussia, Russia and Austria. After the invasion of Poland on 1 September 1939, which set off World War II, Dembinski was deported to Kazakhstan with his mother and grandmother.

== World War II ==
At the age of 17, Ryszard Dembinski joined a Polish army formed under General Władysław Anders, which evacuated to Iran and later formed the nucleus of the Polish 2 Corps, which fought in the Italian campaign (1944–45). Later he was sent to the Scottish-based Polish 1st Armoured Division, commanded by General Stanisław Maczek, which landed in Normandy in early August 1944, forming part of the Canadian 1st Army.

Dembinski took part in the battle to close the Falaise Gap, accomplishing that goal on 21 August 1944. He was in action with the division until the capture of the German naval base at Wilhelmshaven in May 1945. His military career ended with the Malopolski Lancers.

== Post World War II ==
In civilian life he served as Chairman of the Polish Institute and Sikorski Museum in London from 1979 to 2004. During his tenure he arranged funding, largely from veterans and their families, for the preservation of the Polish Institute, especially the regimental colours.

In June 1990, he was part of a delegation accompanying the Polish president-in-exile, Ryszard Kaczorowski, when he handed over the presidential insignia of office to the first post-Communist President of Poland, Lech Wałęsa, in Warsaw. Dembinski would later welcome both Wałęsa and Wałęsa's successor, Aleksander Kwasniewski, to the institute, when both men were on state visits to Great Britain.

== Personal life ==
Dembinski married Wanda, the eldest daughter of Count Edward Raczyński, the Polish Ambassador to the Court of St James in 1939, and between 1979 and 1986, as Polish President-in-Exile. The union was childless.

== Death ==
Ryszard Dembinski died on 29 June 2008. He was survived by his widow.

== Honours ==
Commander's Cross of the Polish Order of Polonia Restituta
