= Ryszard Kaczorowski =

Polish politician (1919–2010)

Ryszard Kaczorowski GCMG
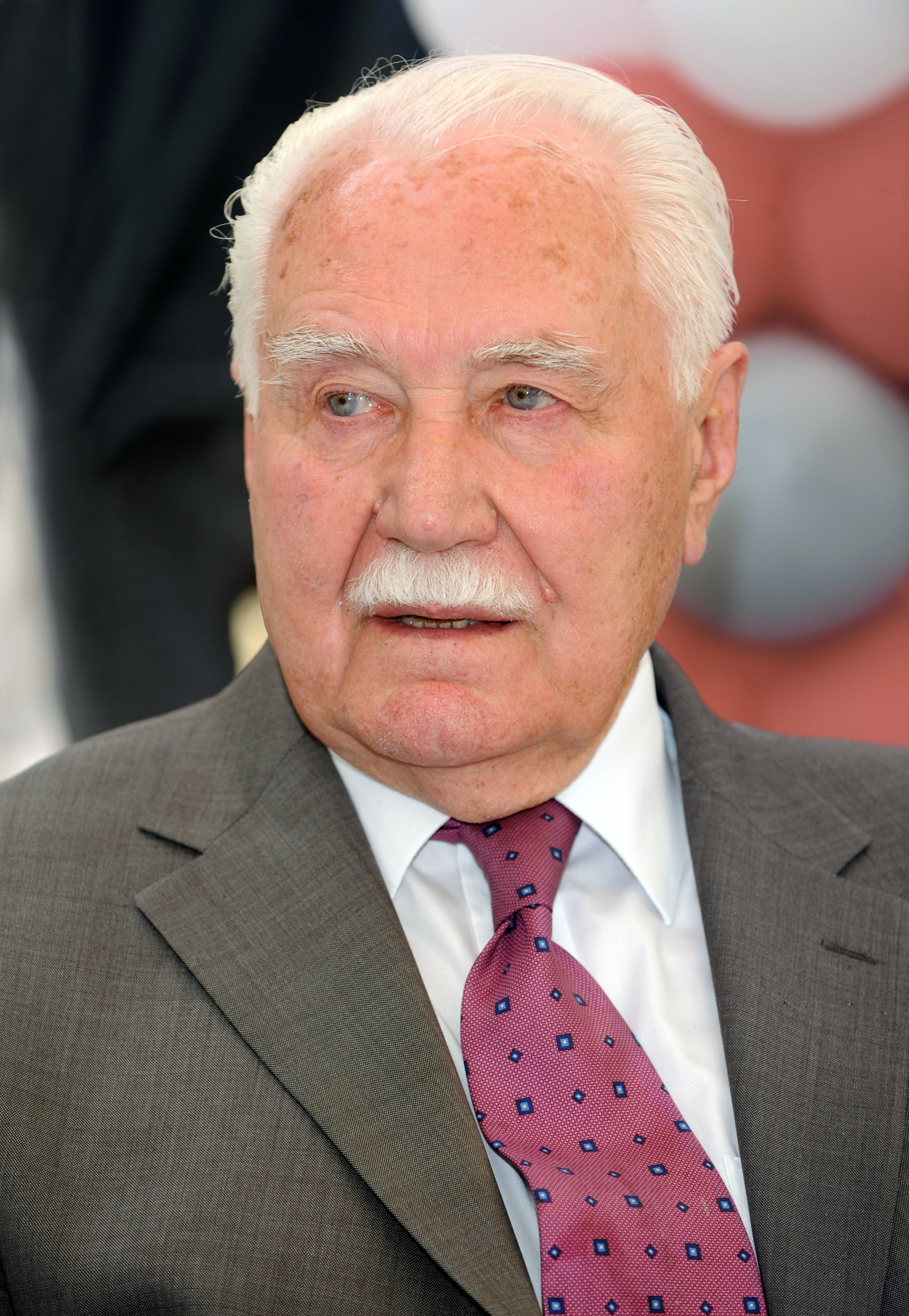
- Kaczorowski in 2008

President of Poland
- in-exile 19 July 1989 – 22 December 1990 Serving with Wojciech Jaruzelski (in country)
- Prime Minister: Edward Szczepanik
- Preceded by: Kazimierz Sabbat
- Succeeded by: Lech Wałęsa (As the first democratically elected president)

Minister of Home Affairs-in-exile
- In office 8 April 1986 – 19 July 1989
- President: Kazimierz Sabbat
- Prime Minister: Edward Szczepanik
- Preceded by: Edward Szczepanik
- Succeeded by: Ryszard Zakrzewski

Personal details
- Born: 26 November 1919 Białystok, Poland
- Died: 10 April 2010 (aged 90) Smolensk, Smolensk Oblast, Russia
- Cause of death: Plane crash
- Party: Independent
- Spouse: Karolina Kaczorowska (m. 1952)
- Children: 2
- Awards: Order of the White Eagle Order of the Polonia Restituta - Grand Cross Order of Polonia Restituta - Officer's Cross Monte Cassino Commemorative Cross Armia Krajowa Cross Pro Memoria Medal Bene Merito honorary badge Order of St. Michael and St. George Political Prisoner Cross Order of Pius IX - Grand Cross Knight's Cross of the Society of Merit of the Order of Saint Lazarus from Jerusalem

Ryszard Kaczorowski, GCMG ([ˈrɨʂart kat͡ʂɔˈrɔfskʲi]; 26 November 1919 – 10 April 2010) was a Polish statesman. From 1989 to 1990, he served as the last president of Poland-in-exile. He succeeded Kazimierz Sabbat, and resigned his post following Poland's regaining independence from the Soviet sphere of influence and the election of Lech Wałęsa as the first democratically elected president of Poland since before the World War II. He died on 10 April 2010 in the plane crash near Smolensk, Russia, along with the president of Poland Lech Kaczyński and other senior government officials.

== Life and career ==
Ryszard Kaczorowski was born on 26 November 1919, in a wooden house at 7 Mazowiecka Street in Piaski District of Białystok. The house stood at the intersection of Mazowiecka Street with the no longer existing Argentyńska Street (now Bułgarska), Białystok, Poland. His parents were Wacław Kaczorowski, of the Jelita Coat of Arms, and Jadwiga (née Sawicka). In 1920, when Białystok was overrun by Soviet forces during the Polish-Soviet War, it briefly served as headquarters of the Polish Revolutionary Committee headed by Julian Marchlewski, which attempted to declare the Polish Soviet Socialist Republic. The city again changed hands after the Battle of Białystok, when the city was liberated by the 1st Legions Infantry Division and 5th Legions' Infantry Regiment. The family witnessed certain dramatic results of the battle from a small wooden house typical of Argentyńska Street.

He completed his education at a school of commerce. He was also a Scouting instructor of a local branch of the Polish Scouting Association. Following the Soviet invasion of Poland at the beginning of World War II, he secretly recreated the scouting movement – which was banned by the Soviet authorities – and became a head of the Białystok banner of the Szare Szeregi.

In July 1940, he was arrested by the NKVD and sent to the Minsk Prison. On 29 January 1941, Kaczorowski was taken to the office of the Minister of Internal Affairs of the Byelorussian SSR, where he asked, among other things, about the possibility of a swift outbreak of Soviet-German war. On 31 January 1941, a show trial was held, and the following day the accused learned that he had been sentenced to death for membership in the Polish counterrevolutionary insurgent organisation Grey Ranks, which aimed to overthrow the Soviet government in Western Belorussia by force of arms. He waited on death row for one hundred days for the sentence to be carried out or changed. It ultimately ended with a ruling by the Supreme Court of the Soviet Union and a 10-year prison sentence, an additional 5-year loss of voting rights and the confiscation of property. On the night of 27-28 May 1941, Kaczorowski was added to a rail transport of prisoners. The wagon reached the transit camp in Nakhodka via Khabarovsk and Vladivostok from which he was transported by ship to Kolyma. He was assigned to the Duskanja gold mine, which in the local language meant "The Valley of Death". He remembered later:

On the third of May, we organised a bonfire in the cell. And since we were on death row, we could not be punished any more, so the guard who opened the window and shouted "quieter!", he hit a clay bowl we had on hand. The bowl splattered, the guard hid, and we sang so that I think the whole prison heard.

Following the Sikorski-Mayski Agreement of 1941, he was set free and enlisted in Anders' Army. After its evacuation from the Soviet Union, Kaczorowski joined the 3rd Carpathian Rifle Division, where he completed divisional secondary school. He fought in most major battles of the Polish 2nd Corps, including the Battle of Monte Cassino. After the war, he remained in the United Kingdom as a political emigrant. Following demobilisation, he completed an academic course in foreign trade at the Polytechnic Regent Street (later the University of Westminster). Until 1986, he worked in business as an accountant. From 1955 to 1967, he was the Chief Scout, and, subsequently, president of the émigré Polish Scouting Union (ZHP). As such, he led the Polish delegation for the 1957 Jamboree.

Kaczorowski was also active in Polish political circles and a member of the National Council of Poland, a parliament-in-exile. In 1986, he was appointed the minister for home affairs within the Polish government-in-exile. As the April Constitution of Poland of 1935 (the legal basis for the government) allowed the president to appoint his successor "in case the seat is emptied before the peace is settled", acting president in exile Kazimierz Sabbat named Kaczorowski as his successor in January 1988. Sabbat died suddenly on 19 July 1989 and Kaczorowski automatically succeeded him. He handed over the insignia of the presidential power of the Second Republic to President Lech Wałęsa on 22 December 1990, signifying both a recognition of the legitimacy of the government in exile and its continuity with the Third Polish Republic.

== Personal life ==
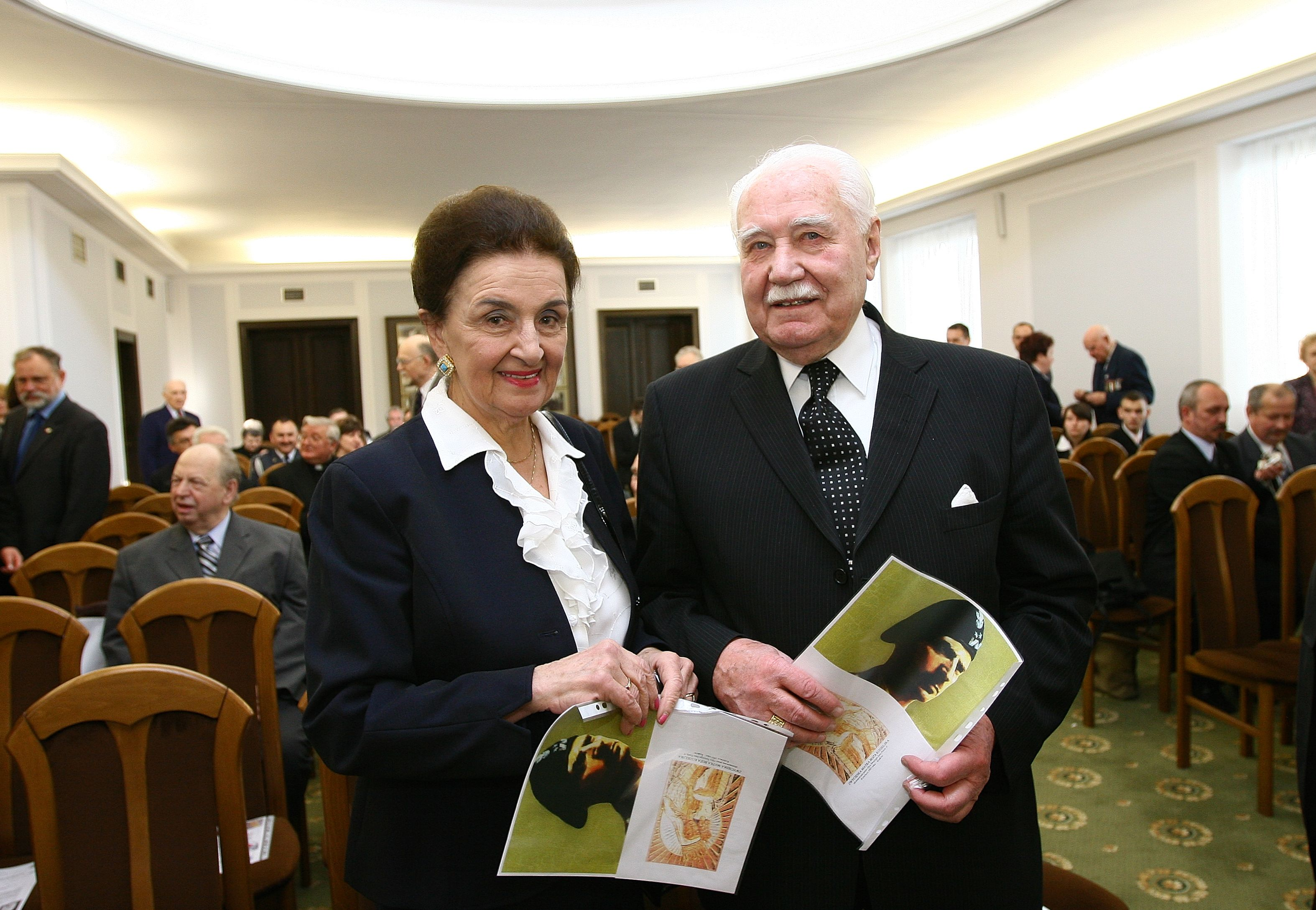
Kaczorowski and his wife in the Senate in 2008

Ryszard Kaczorowski's last home was in London. He had two daughters with his wife Karolina Kaczorowska, Jadwiga Kaczorowska, who has two children, Zenek and Wanda Szulc, and Alicja Jankowska, who has three children, Ryszard, Marcin and Krystyna Jankowska. He was frequently present in Poland and was treated according to the Polish law on former presidents of the state, granting him a presidential pension, Biuro Ochrony Rządu protection and a chancellery. He was an honorary chairman of numerous social and historical organisations, as well as an honorary citizen of almost thirty cities in Poland, including: Warsaw, Gdańsk, Gdynia, Kielce, Kraków, Opole, Zielona Góra and his hometown of Białystok.

During his retirement, Kaczorowski did not hold any public positions, although it was reported that in November 1994, Prime Minister Waldemar Pawlak proposed to President Wałęsa to appoint Kaczorowski as Minister of Defence (as, under the then-constitution, the president appointed the ministers of defence, the interior and foreign affairs, regardless of the prime minister's will). Although he was a self-described follower of Józef Piłsudski (Piłsudczyk), Kaczorowski chose to not get involved in any partisan or strictly political activity during his retirement.

On 9 November 2004, Kaczorowski was appointed to the Order of St Michael and St George as an Honorary Knight Grand Cross by Queen Elizabeth II of the United Kingdom for "his exceptional contribution to the community of Polish emigrees and their descendants living in the UK".

== Death ==
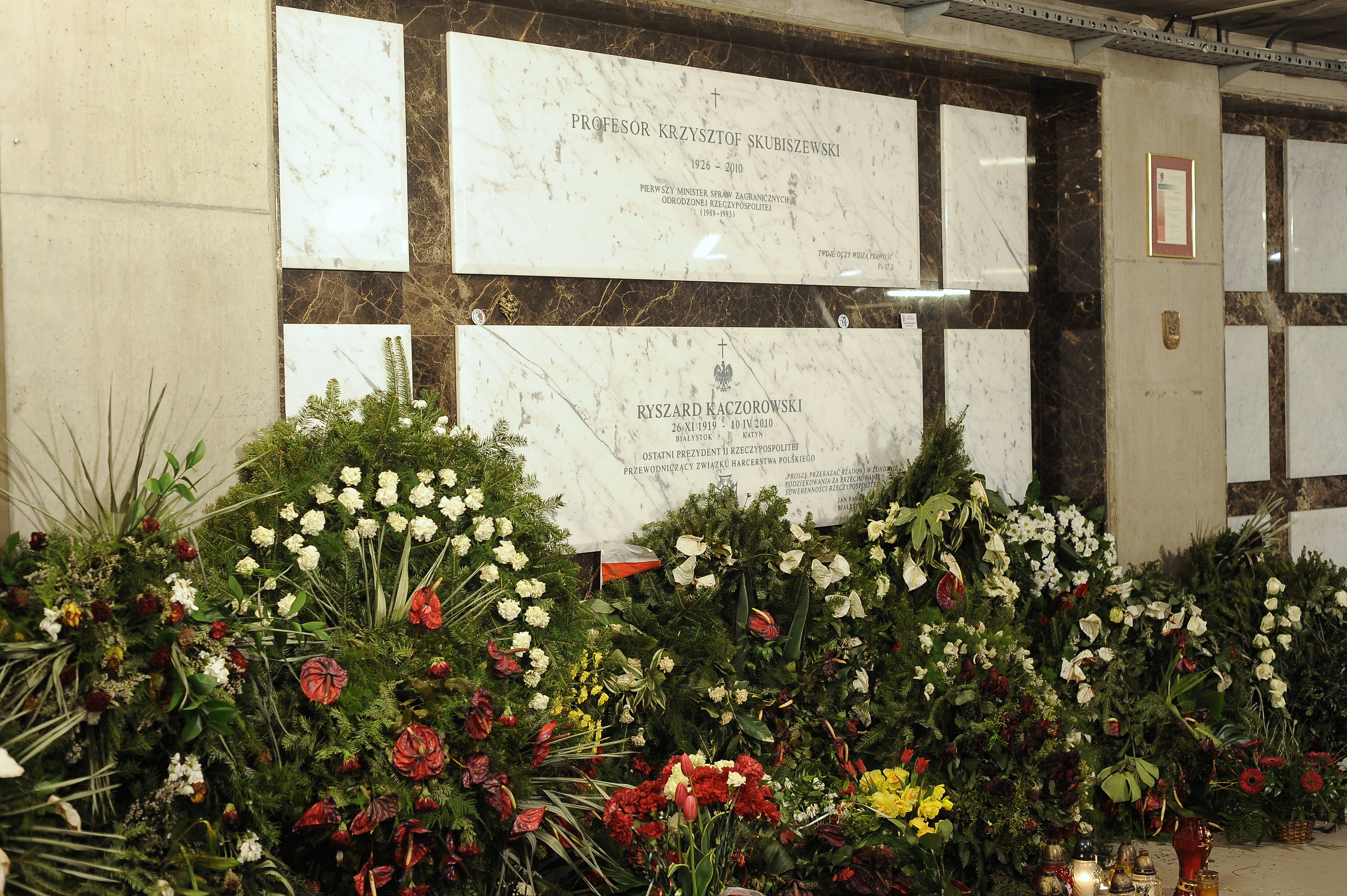
Kaczorowski's tomb in the National Temple of Divine Providence in Warsaw

Kaczorowski died on 10 April 2010 in a plane crash near Smolensk, Russia, along with the then-current president of Poland, Lech Kaczyński, and 94 others. He was 90 years old and was the oldest victim of the crash. On 19 April 2010, Kaczorowski's coffin was taken to St John's Cathedral for a funeral mass, before being buried in a crypt at the National Temple of Divine Providence in Warsaw.

== Bibliography ==
- This article is copied in part from the website of the office of the President of the Republic of Poland, which allows free reproduction of its content; see .
- "Ryszard Kaczorowski". Financial Times. Archived from the original on 11 December 2022.
- "Ryszard Kaczorowski". The Telegraph. 12 April 2010.
- "Ryszard Kaczorowski". The Times.
- Olizar, Michał (14 April 2010). "Ryszard Kaczorowski obituary". The Guardian.
- "Poland buries last president-in-exile, 11 others". Monsters and Critics. 5 October 2012. Archived from the original on 5 October 2012.
- "Radio Poland :: News from Poland". thenews.pl.

Political offices
Preceded by Kazimierz Sabbat	President of the Polish Republic-in-exile; 1989–1990	Succeeded by Lech Wałęsa (domiciled President)
