= Andrzej Głowacki =

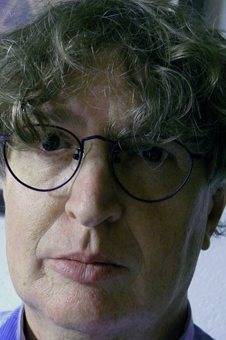
Andrzej Głowacki

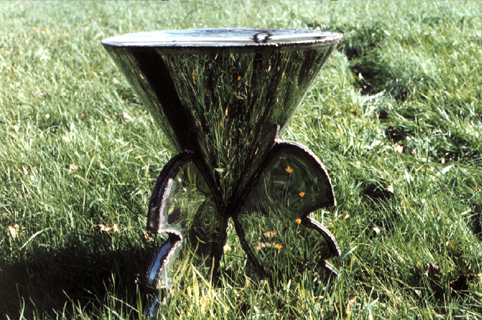
Three Wings metal table by Andy Głowacki

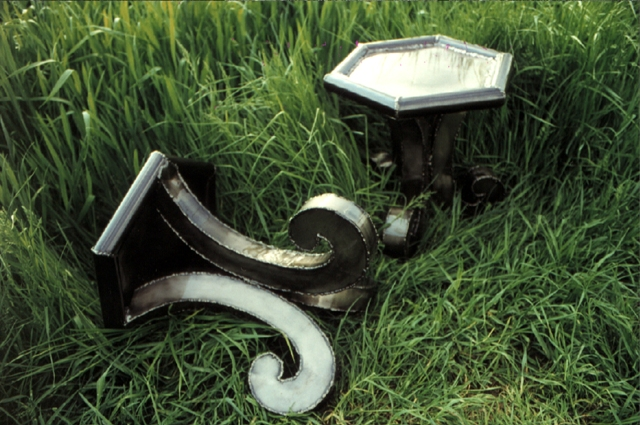
She-chairy metal furniture by Andy Głowacki

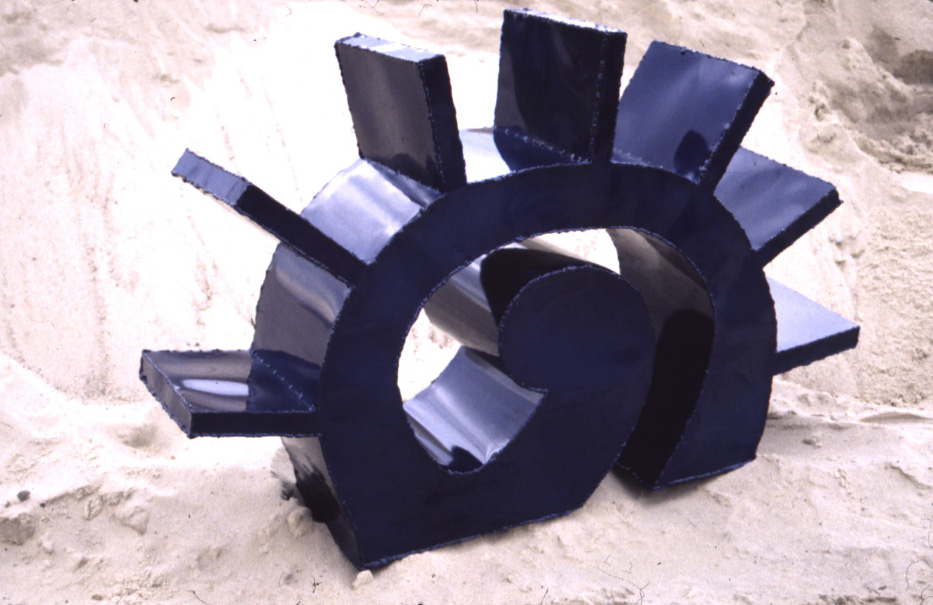
Book Machine - metal furniture by Andy Głowacki

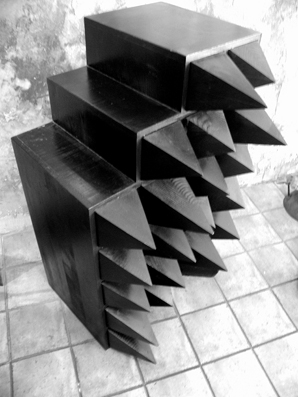
Kittypaws wood furniture by Andy Głowacki

Andrzej Głowacki is a Polish philosopher, designer and graphic artist. He is professor of Academy Of Fine Art in Kraków (where he directs The Third Studio of Interior Design), head of Chair of Commercial Art, Computer Graphics and New Media in University of Information, Technology and Management in Rzeszów, Poland, and a co-author of the nascent Center of Digital Arts and Techniques also in UITM, Rzeszów.

== Scientific career ==
He graduated from Faculty of Interior Design In Academy of Fine Art in Kraków, Poland. His doctoral thesis from 1985 showed groundbreaking approach to methodology of designing process treated as a creative act or even a peak experience rather than simple realization of an idea. Emotional aspect of creating and self-awareness of designer are equally important in this theory based on transpersonal psychology and existentialism. Though the theory was innovative it occurred to be too controversial for its times in Poland. It became a valuable source for curriculum, implemented and developed in The Third Studio of Interior Design since 1994.

He was Dean of Faculty of Interior Design from 1990 to 1993. As the first dean after 1989 he began process of reformation in Academy.

He focuses on teaching and designing tangible and virtual realities, real spaces and cyberspaces.

== Knowledge transfer ==
He was editor-in-chief of CyberEmpathy: Magazine of Visual Communication and New Media in Art Science Humanities Design and Technology (2011 - 2016), published by Marika Wato. The journal continued the transhumanistic research direction described for the first time in the book "From Empathy to Cyberspace" written by Andrzej Głowacki and published in 2009. Andrzej Głowacki was responsible for fourteen editions of the journal as an editor-in-chief:

- Issue 1 / 2011 (1) Sketches from Virtual Reality
- Issue 2 / 2011 (2) The Gilliam’s Atlas
- Issue 1 / 2012 (3) Cyber Fields Forever
- Issue 2 / 2012 (2) Cyber Sky
- Issue 1 / 2013 (3) Soluble Fish
- Issue 2 / 2013 (4) Contemporary Art in Public Space
- Issue 3 / 2013 (5) Architecture for Human, Humanism for Architecture
- Issue 4 / 2013 (6) The Code
- Issue 5 / 2013 (7) Visual Strategies
- Issue 1 / 2014 (8) Augmented Reality
- Issue 2 /2014 (9) Cyber Art
- Issue 1 / 2015 (10) Hyper Visions
- Issue 2 /2015 (11) The Eco-existentialism Theories
- Issue 1 / 2016 (11) The Archetypes of Cyber Space

== Design ==
He was one of the most popular Polish designers in the 1990s. He set up legendary, surrealistic Gallery Jo Design, which was located in Doubting Thomas's Corner in Kraków from 1992 to 1996. Popular Polish and foreign artists: actors, writers, journalists were its frequent guests. Projects from the 1990s represent optimistic design, full of stylistic courage and fun crafts with form. Objects are unconventional and quite unrealistic but they do not lose their functionality. Furniture, lamps and glass projects are the most characteristic. Their finessed shapes and both funny and philosophic names had many admirers in Europe.

== Inspirations ==
Theoretical physics is his great passion and influences his artistic activities. He often compares it with mystical knowledge of old cultures. According to the needs of the future he teaches transhumanistic ideas and designing for cyberspace.

== Exhibitions ==
Exhibitions of drawing, painting, graphics, collage in Poland, Germany, Netherlands and France, ex:

- Nijmeegs Museum – Commanderie van Sint Jan from 29/06 to 11/08 1985
- Museum Oud Rijnsburg - from 22/10/1989 to 16/3/1990 - Kunst uit Oost- Europa

(Kunst uit Polen - review in local press)

== Books ==
- Głowacki, Andrzej (2009). Archetypture of Word. ISBN 978-83-929554-0-5.
- Głowacki, Andrzej (2009). Soluble fish in Insoluble Reality. ISBN 978-83-929554-1-2.
- Głowacki, Andrzej (1994). Jo Design: harmony of opposites (in Polish). Kraków: Studio Jo Design. ISBN 83-902122-0-X.

== Publications ==
- Głowacki, Andrzej (1999). "Egipt w jeansie (Egipt in Jeans)". Archivolta (in Polish). Kraków: 38–41. ISSN 1506-5928.
- Głowacki, Andrzej (1999). "Rozszerzanie świadomosci (Expansion of consciousness)". Architektura I Biznes (in Polish). 6. Kraków: Firma Wydawniczo-Reklamowa RAM. ISSN 1230-1817.
- Głowacki, Andrzej (1998). "Juliusz Verne w Kopalni Soli (Jules Verne in the Salt Mine)". Architektura I Biznes (in Polish). 8. Kraków: Firma Wydawniczo-Reklamowa RAM. ISSN 1230-1817.
- Głowacki, Andrzej (1992). "Nasza przestrzeń, nasz czas (Our Space Our Times)". Architektura I Biznes (in Polish). 1 (1). Kraków: Firma Wydawniczo-Reklamowa RAM. ISSN 1230-1817.
