= Ryszard Głowacki =

Polish engineer (born 1937)

Ryszard Głowacki (born 1937 in Dukla) is a Polish engineer of geology, writer, publicist and a science fiction author of 3 novels and almost 30 short stories.
