= Ryszard Zakrzewski =

Ryszard Zakrzewski was a Polish traveller, topographer, and an officer in the Russian Army who lived in the 19th century. Zakrzewski was a member of the Russian Geographical Society. He was an author of topographic works and focused his research on the Altay, Dzungaria, and Semirechye regions.

In 1886, he headed a geographic expedition responsible for surveying the northwestern territories in China known as Dzungaria.
