= Bronisław Pieracki =

Polish military officer and politician (1895–1934)

Bronisław Wilhelm Pieracki
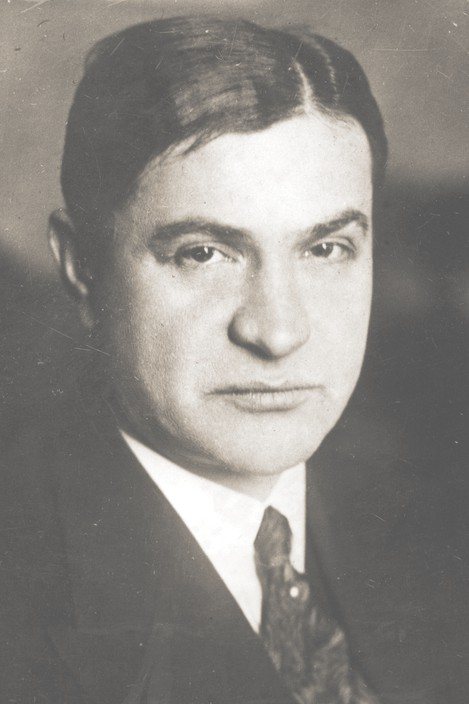
- Bronisław Pieracki

Minister of Interior of the Republic of Poland
- In office 23 June 1931 – 15 June 1934
- Preceded by: Felicjan Sławoj Składkowski
- Succeeded by: Leon Kozłowski

Personal details
- Born: 28 May 1895 Gorlice, Austria-Hungary
- Died: 15 June 1934 (aged 39) Warsaw, Poland
- Resting place: Cemetery in Nowy Sącz
- Party: Nonpartisan Bloc for Cooperation with the Government
- Occupation: Politician, military officer

Military service
- Branch/service: Polish Army
- Rank: Pułkownik (Colonel)
- Battles/wars: Polish-Ukrainian War

Bronisław Wilhelm Pieracki (28 May 1895 – 15 June 1934) was a Polish military officer and politician, Legionnaire, certified infantry colonel of the Polish Army (commander of one of the sectors during the Defence of Lwów in the Polish–Ukrainian War), an official of the Ministry of Military Affairs and subsequently its secretary of state (from 19 April 1929 to 4 December 1930). He served as a member of the Sejm during its 2nd and 3rd terms in the Second Polish Republic representing the Nonpartisan Bloc for Cooperation with the Government (1928 and 1930–1934, also serving for a time as its vice-chairman). He was the 2nd Deputy Chief of the General Staff (from 9 October 1928 to 19 April 1929), Deputy Prime Minister in the cabinet of Walery Sławek (from 5 December 1930 to 28 May 1931), and minister without portfolio (from 28 May to 23 June 1931). He then served as Minister of Internal Affairs in the governments of Aleksander Prystor, Janusz Jędrzejewicz, and Leon Kozłowski (from 23 June 1931 to 15 June 1934).

He was one of the closest associates of Józef Piłsudski following the May Coup and was considered a leading member of the political faction known as the colonels' group. He was assassinated by Hryhorij Maciejko, a member of the Organization of Ukrainian Nationalists.

== Life ==
He was born to Stanisław Jan Pieracki (1849–1929), a chief customs guard officer, and Eugenia Maria née Budziszowska (Note: Eugenia's given name is sometimes listed simply as Maria. For example, on the website "Józef Piłsudski Museum in Sulejówek". Archived from the original on 18 February 2015..). His godparents were Bronisław Ajdukiewicz and Julia Marcela Wiśniewska.

The Pieracki family settled in Galicia, having fled Russian persecution shortly after the November Uprising. The family frequently referred to its patriotic traditions; Bronisław's grandfather had participated in the uprising. The family was large. Besides Bronisław, who was the youngest child, the children included Zygmunt (1885–1944), Kazimierz (1891–1941), Tadeusz (d. 1941), Wanda (1885–1937), Maria, and Jadwiga.

Pieracki spent his childhood and youth in Nowy Sącz. The family's residence was located at 27 Matejki Street. Both Bronisław and Kazimierz attended the First Philological Gymnasium in Nowy Sącz. The youngest of the brothers studied there between 1906 and 1914. He was not considered an outstanding student. In May and June 1914, he passed his matura examinations in Polish, Latin, and Ancient Greek.

Even during this period, Bronisław Pieracki was active in clandestine Polish independence organizations. He was a member of the group known as the Duchowcy ("Followers of Duch"), named after its founder, Kazimierz Duch. The organization sympathized with the Polish Socialist Party. Other members included the future general Józef Kustroń. In 1912, the organization merged with another secret Nowy Sącz association of a similar character, the Promieniści ("Radiant Ones"). The new organization became known as the Jastrzębie ("Hawks") or the Union of Hawks.

Pieracki was one of the three principal leaders of the organization. The Jastrzębie later gave rise to a Riflemen's Squad established in 1913. Bronisław Pieracki was also active in the Polish scouting movement. In September 1913, for example, he organized exercises involving several scout troops and members of the Riflemen's Association.

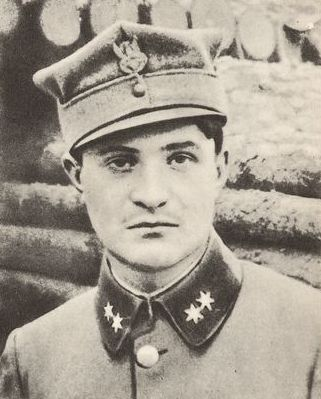
Bronisław Pieracki while serving with the Second Brigade of the Polish Legions

In 1913, he graduated from the officer school of the Riflemen's Association, Nowy Sącz branch, obtaining the rank of ensign. By that time, he was already a member of the Association of Active Struggle. During the following months, he furthered his military education, participating in a summer squad leaders' school (July 1914) and an instructors' course at Primary School No. 1 in Nowy Sącz, conducted by Michał Żymierski. Following the outbreak of World War I, Pieracki joined a group of volunteers commanded by his brother Kazimierz. Soon afterward, 96 members of the Nowy Sącz Riflemen's Association and local scout units departed for Kraków to enlist in the newly forming Polish Legions.

Bronisław Pieracki joined the Western Legion, a military formation established in Kraków on 27 August 1914 from the Riflemen's Association, the Kraków District of the Polish Rifle Squads, and the Union of Podhale Squads. He was appointed commander of a platoon, a position he held until May 1915. He subsequently commanded the 7th Company of the 2nd Infantry Regiment of the Polish Legions, which formed part of the Second Brigade of the Polish Legions. In October 1914, these units were deployed to Hungary and Ukraine. Pieracki's regiment participated in the battles of Zielona (19 October 1914), Mołotków (29 October 1914), Pasieczna (30 October 1914), and Rafajłowa (23–25 January 1915). Heavy fighting continued throughout November 1914.

The unit's subsequent combat route included operations in areas of present-day northern Romania. In January 1915, the regiment took part in the Battle of Kirlibaba (18–22 January 1915), as well as engagements at Brasa, Łopuszne (10 February 1915), Tłumacz (5 March 1915), Kolorówka (6 March 1915), and Bortniki (9 March 1915). At Kolomyia, the regiment's IV Battalion was separated and later served as the nucleus for the creation of the 4th Infantry Regiment of the Polish Legions. The regiment was formed in Piotrków Trybunalski under the command of Colonel Bolesław Roja. Its ranks consisted primarily of volunteers from Podhale and Congress Poland. In May 1915, the regiment was incorporated into the Third Brigade, Polish Legions. At that time, Pieracki commanded the 7th Company of the 4th Infantry Regiment, making him one of its youngest company commanders. On 15 July 1915, his unit was sent to the front.

The regiment received its baptism of fire during the Battle of Jastków. On 31 July 1915, during the engagement, Bronisław Pieracki was seriously wounded when a bullet struck him in the chest. A commemorative publication issued after his death in 1934 described the event as follows:

The 7th Company of the 2nd Battalion took part in the assault in order to reinforce the left flank. Advancing from reserve into the line, it was caught by devastating fire and could not move forward. At that moment, Lieutenant Bronisław Pieracki exemplary stepped to the front to lead his men onward. Struck in the chest by a bullet, he remained standing despite terrible pain, fearing that if he fell, his men would retreat. For two more hours he continued to command, until weakened by blood loss he finally collapsed.

The bullet passed through his thorax above the heart and beneath the clavicle. Pieracki was sent to recover in Nowy Sącz. He spent several months convalescing at the Holy Cross Hospital in the city. He returned to the front in January 1916 and fought in Volhynia until October of that year. During this period, he temporarily assumed command of the 2nd battalion of the 4th Infantry Regiment. His commanding officer, Bolesław Roja, wrote a highly favorable assessment of him:

An upright and proven character, calm temperament, energetic in service, very brave in battle, well-oriented, calm under fire and capable of initiative; exemplary outside service, faultless toward superiors, attentive to subordinates, and possessing excellent military education.

During his service, he was promoted successively to second lieutenant on 5 November 1914, lieutenant on 26 May 1915, and captain on 1 November 1916.

During the Oath Crisis, he refused to swear allegiance to the German Emperor. As a result, he was demoted in September 1917 and conscripted into the Austro-Hungarian Army, serving in the 16th Imperial-Royal Landwehr Regiment "Krakau" until May 1918. During this period, he was stationed in Italy. Eventually declared medically unfit for service, he was discharged and returned to Lwów. He later moved to Kraków, where he resumed his education by enrolling in the Faculty of Philosophy at the Jagiellonian University during the summer semester of the 1916–1917 academic year. He left the university on 26 September 1918.

In the second half of August 1917, he became commander of the Polish Military Organisation district in Nowy Sącz, and later in Lwów. During this period, he resumed legal studies at the Jan Kazimierz University. As tensions between Poles and Ukrainians intensified, General Roja ordered him to organize Polish volunteer units composed primarily of former legionnaires and members of the Polish Military Organisation.

During the defence of Lwów, he was appointed commander of the strategically important Sector XI and, from 2 November 1918, commander of forces in District II. He subsequently served as liaison officer for Sector V at the Supreme Command of the city's defence, commander of Sector IV at the Sienkiewicz School (from 13 November 1918), and commander of the city's reserve forces (from 21 November 1918).

On 24 November 1918, Pieracki was promoted to major, and on 17 May 1922 he was awarded the Virtuti Militari (5th Class).

As a member of the Polish Legions in World War I, Pieracki took part in the Polish-Ukrainian War (1918–1919). He later supported Józef Piłsudski's May 1926 Coup.

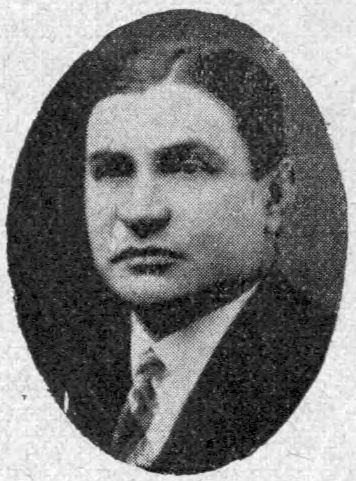
Bronisław Pieracki, c. 1928

Accepted into the Polish Army on 1 January 1919, with confirmation of his existing rank of major, Pieracki was assigned to Warsaw, where he joined the Verification Commission of the Polish Legions. In March 1919, he transferred to the Ministry of Military Affairs. On 23 June 1919, effective from 1 April of that year, he was appointed head of the Religious Affairs Section, which, during the organization of chaplaincy services for non-Catholic denominations, formed part of the Ministry's Mobilization and Organizational Department.

Later, because of the ongoing Polish–Soviet War, he was assigned to the Headquarters of the Commander-in-Chief, where he served as a liaison officer representing quartermaster troops. He subsequently served with the Pomeranian Operational Group, having been transferred at the request of its commander, General Roi.

On 3 May 1922, he was confirmed in the rank of lieutenant colonel, with seniority dating from 1 June 1919, ranking 123rd in the infantry officers' corps. After the end of hostilities, he continued serving in the Ministry of Military Affairs. There he received highly favorable evaluations from his superiors. On 3 November 1921, General Eugeniusz de Henning-Michaelis wrote of him:

After completing further specialist training, he is fundamentally suited for service as a General Staff officer. He distinguishes himself through intelligence, great tact in dealing with both superiors and subordinates, whose loyalty he consistently wins, and possesses a complete university education. He is diligent, ambitious, energetic, independent, and a capable organizer, displaying considerable initiative. In the difficult position of head of the Non-Catholic Religious Affairs Department, he always fulfills his duties to my complete satisfaction. His conduct outside service is beyond reproach.

As a result of such commendations, Pieracki was sent for advanced military studies. From 1 November 1923 to 15 October 1924, he attended the advanced course of the Higher War School in Warsaw.

At the end of 1921, Pieracki also joined Honor and Fatherland (Honor i Ojczyzna), also known as H_{2}O and Strażnica, a secret military organization founded in 1921 by General Władysław Sikorski with the knowledge of Józef Piłsudski and Kazimierz Sosnkowski. Its purpose was to train soldiers, maintain high moral standards within the officer corps, and preserve the political neutrality of the armed forces. The organization was dissolved in July 1923. During this period, Pieracki is also said to have briefly been a Freemason. He has been listed as a member of the National Grand Lodge of Poland, which he allegedly joined on Piłsudski's recommendation together with Józef Beck, Adam Koc, Bogusław Miedziński, Aleksander Prystor, and Walery Sławek.

On 15 October 1924, after completing the course and receiving a General Staff officer's diploma, he was assigned to Army Inspectorate No. IV as First Referent. He did not take up the post, however, as he was instead placed at the disposal of the Minister of Military Affairs effective the same day. On 1 December 1924, President Stanisław Wojciechowski promoted him to colonel, with seniority from 15 August 1924 and twelfth place in the infantry officers' corps.

On 22 June 1925, Pieracki was invested with the commander insignia of the Order of St. Gregory the Great, awarded by Pope Pius XI in recognition of his services to the Church; the decoration was presented by General Sikorski. In 1924, while attached to the Ministry of Military Affairs, he served as a supernumerary officer of the 4th Legions Infantry Regiment, acting as a staff officer for special assignments. During this period, he worked closely with Sikorski. As Minister of Military Affairs, Sikorski appointed him secretary of the section of the Council of Ministers' Political Committee responsible for the eastern provinces and national minorities. Sikorski gave him an enthusiastic evaluation:

An officer of outstanding intelligence. Exceptionally perceptive. Possesses a remarkable ability to master general military issues. His sense of personal dignity, duty, and ambition is highly developed. Mature in outlook, he approaches military service as a vocation. Tactful. Passionately interested in political and state affairs. Given his proven loyalty, his work in this field can be beneficial to the national cause. Physically weakened by wartime experiences. He requires a return to line service for a period in order to become an excellent General Staff officer.

According to some contemporaries, Piłsudski assigned Pieracki to work closely with Sikorski in order to keep the Marshal informed of the general's plans and activities. This may explain an incident in 1925, when Pieracki, according to the then minister's adjutant Mieczysław Lisiewicz, together with police commissioner Włodzimierz Wiskowski, allegedly attempted to persuade Sikorski to carry out a coup d'état, assuring him of support from Piłsudski's followers. Sikorski rejected the proposal. After Sikorski's resignation and the brief tenure of General Stefan Majewski as minister, Pieracki became chief of staff to the new Minister of Military Affairs, General Lucjan Żeligowski.

By this time, Pieracki had become part of the informal circle of Piłsudski's close associates known as the Colonels' Group. Its members included Józef Beck, Janusz Jędrzejewicz, Wacław Jędrzejewicz, Adam Koc, Leon Kozłowski, Ignacy Matuszewski, Bogusław Miedziński, Aleksander Prystor, Walery Sławek, Kazimierz Świtalski, and Adam Skwarczyński. Pieracki was the youngest member of the group and, unlike most of the others, had not served in the First Brigade of the Polish Legions.

Although Pieracki was not a supporter of a forcible seizure of power by Piłsudski's camp, he became involved in planning and carrying out the May Coup of 1926. Shortly before the coup, as political tensions increased, he was removed from his position in the Ministry of Military Affairs on 11 May. During the coup itself, Piłsudski's supporters made him responsible for maintaining contacts with the Polish Socialist Party and railway trade unions. He worked closely with the railway union leader Adam Kuryłowicz, to whom he conveyed instructions on 12 May regarding the declaration of a railway strike. The strike proved to be one of the factors that tipped the balance in favor of the coup forces, as many units loyal to the government failed to reach Warsaw in time.

On 11 October 1926, he was transferred from his position as a special assignments staff officer in the Ministry of Military Affairs to the disposal of the Chief of the General Staff, while simultaneously being assigned to the Ministry of Internal Affairs as head of the Independent Military Department. In this role, Piłsudski tasked him with examining personnel matters within the ministry and overseeing its Nationalities Department. He took a particular interest in the Ukrainian minority. On 15 June 1927, Piłsudski appointed him the Minister of Military Affairs' delegate to the Ministry of Agriculture, responsible for agricultural affairs and wartime food supply planning.

During this period, Pieracki was involved in preparations for parliamentary elections intended to secure victory for Piłsudski's supporters. He advocated combating the opposition through the use of Provincial Regional Committees, organizations that officially had a social rather than political character. Pieracki called for the elimination of groups opposed to the Sanation regime through the use of state institutions controlled by Piłsudski's camp and supported uncompromising political struggle.

Pieracki was elected to the Sejm in the parliamentary elections of 4 March 1928 as a candidate of the Nonpartisan Bloc for Cooperation with the Government from Electoral District No. 44, comprising the counties of Bochnia, Limanowa, Nowy Sącz, and Wieliczka. Effective 26 March 1928, he was placed on inactive status for the duration of his parliamentary mandate.

In the Sejm, he served on both the Administrative Committee and the Military Affairs Committee, soon becoming chairman of the latter. On 15 May 1928, he was also appointed organizational vice-president of the BBWR. During this period, he strengthened his cooperation with Walery Sławek and advocated transforming the BBWR into a formal political party.

He soon resigned his parliamentary mandate. Effective 1 November 1928, he was recalled from inactive status and appointed Second Deputy Chief of the General Staff. His principal responsibility was coordinating the civilian ministries' preparations for a potential future war. Effective 22 April 1929, he was once again placed on inactive status.

He was minister of internal affairs from 27 May 1931 until his 1934 assassination, and was posthumously awarded Poland's highest civilian and military decoration, the Order of the White Eagle.

== Deputy Minister ==
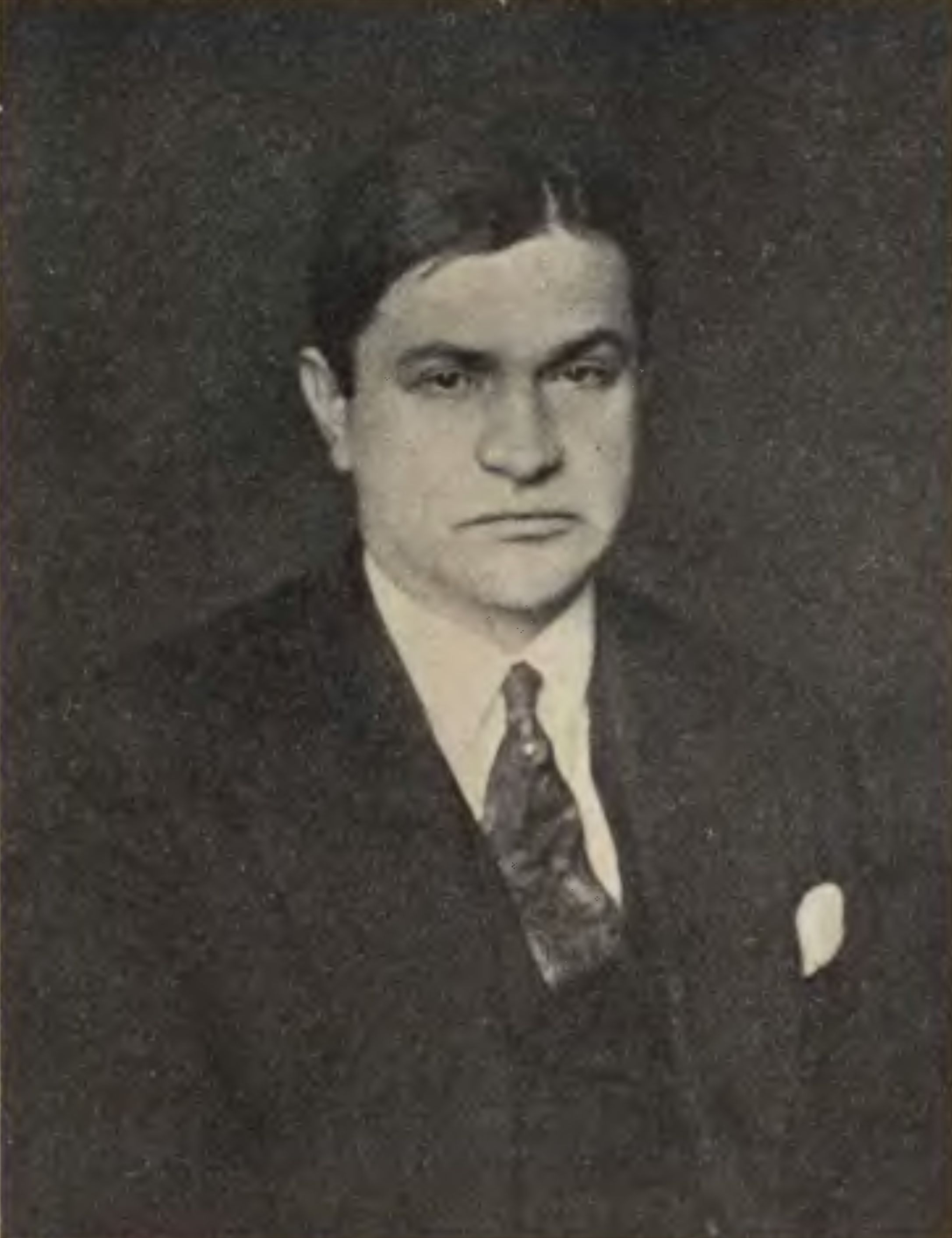
Bronisław Pieracki in the 1930s

On April 19, 1929, Pieracki assumed the position of secretary of state in the Ministry of Internal Affairs (formally, therefore, holding the function of deputy minister). He was personally assigned to this post by Józef Piłsudski, who wanted a trusted individual to support the then-minister, Felicjan Sławoj Składkowski. The Marshal also wished for Pieracki to clean up the department's operations (including preventing the creation of further unnecessary legal acts) and to take care of matters neglected by his boss, who was constantly occupied with inspections and travels. Składkowski himself recalled that Piłsudski informed him of Pieracki's nomination with the words:

You must go to Sławoj and support him, because the boy has completely gone off the rails—he does nothing but drive around in his car.

As it soon turned out, Pieracki practically took over the management of the entire ministry, even to the extent that his decisions led to a jurisdictional conflict with the minister himself (this was the case with circular No. 235 of October 23, 1929, the content of which overlapped with a similar legal act previously issued by Składkowski concerning the registry and distribution of circulars).

From May 4, 1929, to December 4, 1930, Pieracki was also the chairman of the editorial committee of *Gazeta Administracyjna i Policja Państwowa*—a biweekly periodical published by the Ministry of Internal Affairs, intended for state officials. During this time, he also became involved in commercial activities; in the summer of 1929, he joined the board of the state-owned Trade and Agricultural Joint Stock Company "Kooprolna".

As a result of the parliamentary elections in November 1930, he became a member of parliament once again. This time he ran in district No. 45, which included Tarnów, Brzesko, Pilzno, Dąbrowa, Grzybów, and Gorlice. He was also placed 20th on the national BBWR list. During the elections themselves, he was not involved in his own campaign but was busy, among other things, ensuring the state administration's favor for candidates of the Nonpartisan Bloc for Cooperation with the Government (during the elections, the government side committed many formal abuses and disrupted the election campaigns of opposition groups). Pieracki himself strongly supported the Sanation movement's actions in this sphere, as well as the subsequent Brest trials. Among other actions, he spoke at a press conference aimed at providing the media with information that justified such conduct by the ruling camp.

Pieracki was also involved in carrying out the repressive Pacification of Ukrainians in Eastern Galicia, which was motivated by sabotage actions of the Ukrainian Military Organization, but was effectively directed against the Ukrainian population in the Republic of Poland and their social organizations on the basis of collective responsibility. It was carried out by the Polish administrative authorities, police, and army by order of Prime Minister Piłsudski during the election campaign ahead of the elections to the Sejm from September 16 to November 30, 1930. It covered at least 450 Ukrainian villages across 16 powiats (districts). Pieracki participated in the preparation of the entire campaign. Some sources also point to him as the person designated by Minister Składkowski to coordinate this enterprise on behalf of the Ministry of Internal Affairs.

== Deputy Prime Minister ==
Pieracki was the deputy minister of internal affairs in the governments of: Kazimierz Świtalski, the fifth cabinet of Kazimierz Bartel, the first cabinet of Walery Sławek, and the second cabinet of Józef Piłsudski. On December 4, 1930, he became a minister without portfolio and deputy prime minister in the second government of Sławek. He was recommended for this position as well by Marshal Piłsudski. Following the resignation of the government and the formation of a new cabinet under the leadership of Aleksander Prystor (May 27, 1931), Kazimierz Świtalski proposed that Pieracki take over the treasury department. However, this portfolio went to Jan Piłsudski. Pieracki once again became deputy prime minister and minister without portfolio. The topic of taking over the Ministry of Treasury returned a bit later, but then Pieracki himself rejected the idea.

== Minister ==
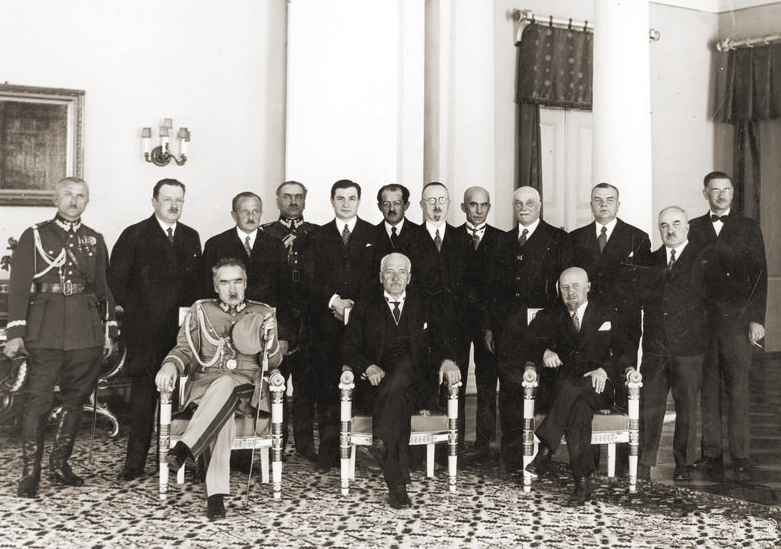
The Cabinet of Aleksander Prystor; Minister of Internal Affairs Bronisław Pieracki is standing fifth from the left

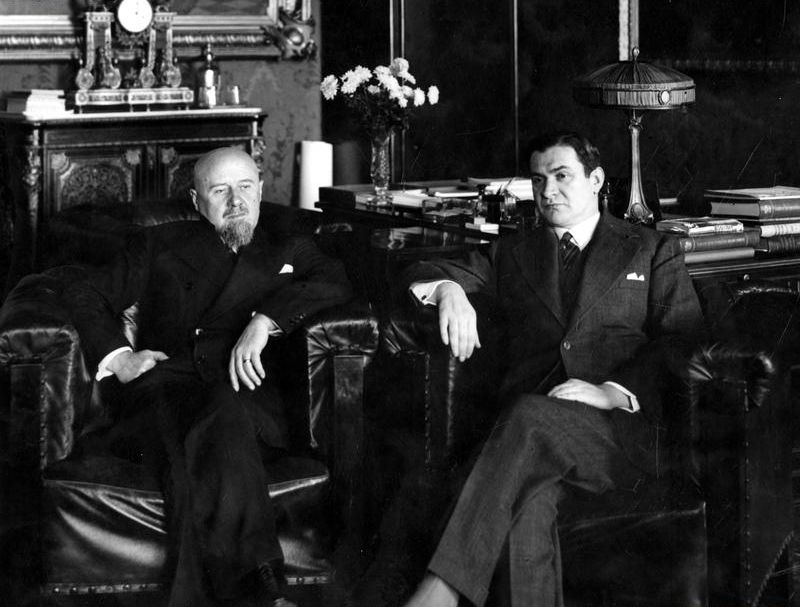
Bronisław Pieracki on a visit to Prime Minister Aleksander Prystor

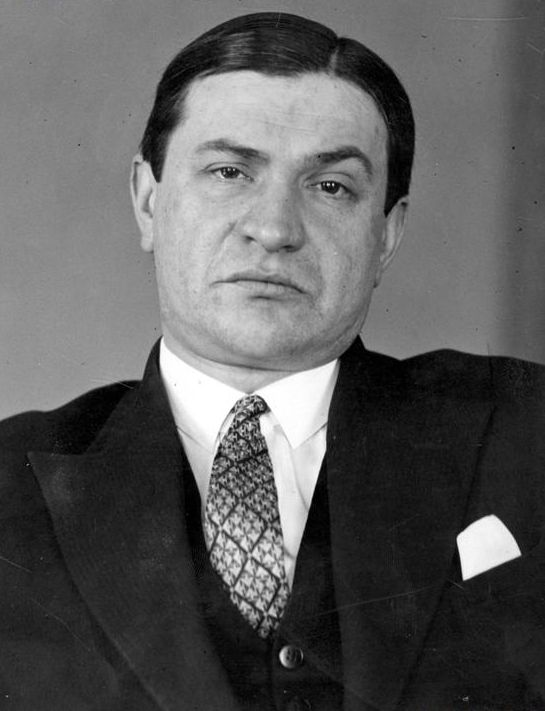
Bronisław Pieracki as Minister of Internal Affairs

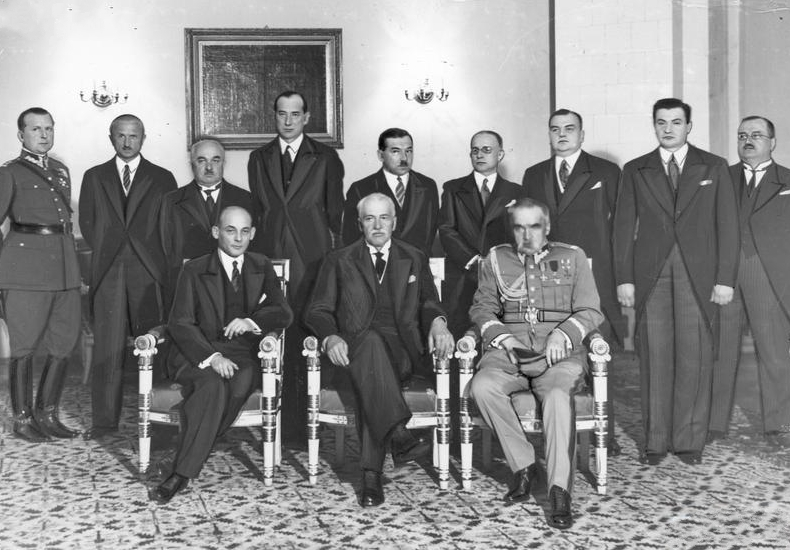
The Cabinet of Janusz Jędrzejewicz. Minister of Internal Affairs Bronisław Pieracki is standing second from the right.

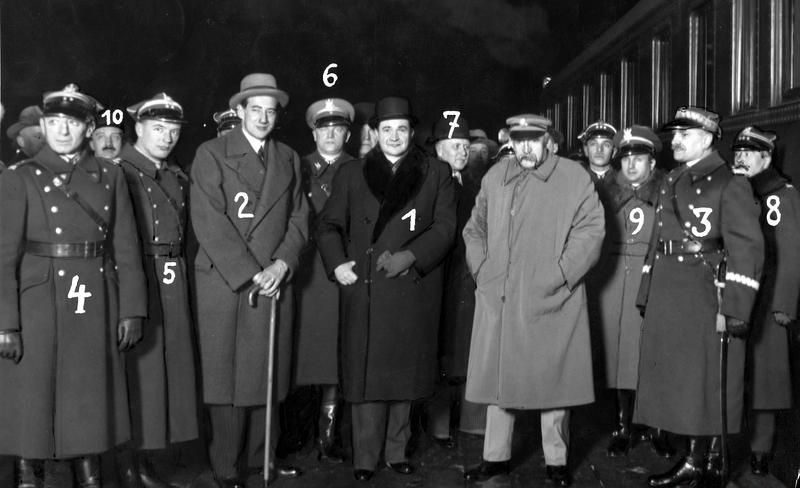
The departure of Józef Piłsudski to Vilnius in January 1933; Pieracki is standing in the middle, right next to the Marshal

On June 22, 1931, Bronisław Pieracki became the minister of internal affairs in the government of Aleksander Prystor. In this position, he replaced Felicjan Sławoj Składkowski. One of his main tasks was to relieve the Prime Minister of day-to-day domestic policy matters in favor of economic issues. Pieracki fulfilled this requirement, though relations between him and Prystor were not the best.

Pieracki began his administration in the Ministry of Internal Affairs by introducing changes to the scope of duties of individual departments within the ministry. The first major project he implemented, concerning nationwide policy, involved issues related to local government reform. At the end of 1931, a draft law on this matter was prepared. Its purpose was to harmonize the operations of state and local government authorities, unify the structure of local government throughout the country (including introducing local government in the southeastern voivodeships), precisely define the personal liability of representatives of local government executive bodies, double the terms of office for wójts, mayors, and burgomasters, and standardize the electoral regulations for individual local governments. The Act on Partial Amendment of the Local Government System, popularly known as the "Unification Act", was adopted on March 23, 1933, and entered into force on July 13, 1933.

The second thematic area Pieracki dealt with at that time was relations with the Ukrainian minority in Poland. The policy proposed for implementation by his ministry aimed to ease tensions in Eastern Galicia by making gestures of goodwill toward the Ukrainian population (developing schooling, admitting Ukrainians to administrative positions), provided that they maintained an apolitical stance. In the summer of 1931, three Ukrainian members of parliament who had been imprisoned until then were released. In January 1932, during a meeting of the budget committee, Pieracki presented the main principles that were to guide him in relations with representatives of the Ukrainian national minority in Poland. As he noted, the harmonious coexistence of all citizens of different nationalities is possible, but it must be based on mutual respect. The role of the state is to satisfy the economic and cultural needs of the minority, but in exchange, it demands loyalty (Note: As he stated: A loyal national minority can always be sure of care and assistance from the state. The government has the right to restrict the activities of those who violate legal norms and cause harm to other citizens. For in a democratic state, every citizen is allowed to think, judge, and act freely, provided that he defends his views with reason without resorting to violence and deception. Nor can a situation be tolerated in which the Polish population would feel threatened or boycotted by the Ukrainian population and remain under the influence of violence and terror. Ukrainians will be treated like any other nationality, after all, a few organizations do not yet constitute the Ukrainian question.). For this reason, it would employ the Ukrainian intelligentsia in public offices. A little later, Pieracki emphasized that in seeking an accommodation with moderate Ukrainians, the government in the consistent execution of its plans will go over the heads of politicians and find a direct way to reach an understanding with the population. The minister was a proponent of combating anti-state forces, particularly communists. As he noted, a possible agreement with the Ukrainians was only feasible by bypassing the leadership of radical, nationalist organizations. On the basis of these guidelines, the BBWR began talks with the Ukrainian National Democratic Alliance (UNDO); however, a complaint lodged by Ukrainians with the League of Nations regarding the pacification of Ukrainians in Eastern Galicia, along with the subsequent assassination of Tadeusz Hołówko by Ukrainian nationalists, led to the failure of the negotiations.

Another important task completed by Pieracki as Minister of Internal Affairs was the organization of the second general census in the history of the Second Polish Republic, which took place on December 9, 1931.

The period of Pieracki's tenure as Minister of Internal Affairs was a turbulent time in Polish history regarding social unrest driven by economic factors. In March 1932 alone, over 500 strikes broke out, and a year later, a general strike was proclaimed. On numerous occasions, the police intervened very brutally (resulting in casualties), for which Minister Pieracki shared responsibility. In later speeches, however, he rejected accusations raised by the opposition that Poland had become a police state.

Pieracki was also involved in the work on drafting the April Constitution, although he was not the primary author of its provisions. In January 1932, he spoke on the planned composition of the Sejm and Senat in the constitutional system postulated for the state by Sanation. He advocated for senators to be delegates of local government deliberative bodies designated through general elections, representatives of professional self-government corporations, and individuals appointed by the President of Poland. Most likely, he was also opposed to selecting the President of the Republic by way of popular vote (an issue that was also being discussed during this period among Sanation politicians preparing the text of the future basic law).

On May 9, 1933, Aleksander Prystor submitted the resignation of his government, and he was replaced by Janusz Jędrzejewicz. In the new cabinet, in accordance with Piłsudskiego's guidelines and apart from himself as Minister of Military Affairs, only Pieracki, Józef Beck (Minister of Foreign Affairs), and Emil Kaliński (Minister of Posts and Telegraphs) retained their positions. The Minister of Internal Affairs was highly valued by the new Prime Minister, who wrote about him as follows:

Very talented, he belonged to those people for whom political activity is a specific game with all its characteristic ploys. He knew how to work within a wide scope of political relations and fulfilled the tasks entrusted to him well within that range. It seemed to me, however, that his talents would have been more valuable if Pieracki's outlook on life had a deeper foundation and a more principled approach to reality. Then, tactical moves and the necessary elements of the game would have been more closely tied to the entirety of great state affairs, losing some of what could be seen as cunning, smartness, a lack of loyalty, or sincerity.

He played a significant role in this cabinet as well, for instance, substituting for Jędrzejewicz at meetings of the Council of Ministers when the latter was absent. Stanisław Cat-Mackiewicz also spoke positively of Pieracki, describing him as follows:

He was a man of an iron fist, an energetic administrator, but his brain pulsed and his mind was open to any argumentation.

Pieracki also joined the cabinet formed by Leon Kozłowski, which was established on May 15, 1934.

The successive, annual speeches in the Sejm concerning the ministry's budget served as occasions to present the directions of Pieracki's policy as Minister of Internal Affairs. In these speeches, he advocated for treating all citizens equally, regardless of their nationality (this applied to Ukrainians, Germans, and Jews living in Poland), and for pursuing a decisive public security policy due to the country's geographical position, ethnic diversity, and differences in development between its various regions. He also expressed anti-communist views. At the same time, he condemned racism and terrorism.

Pieracki was considered a representative of that faction of the colonels group which favored authoritarian methods of governance by the Sanation camp. During his tenure as Minister of Internal Affairs, a law restricting the possibility of assemblies was enacted (March 1932), a new penal code (July 1932), a decree limiting judicial independence (August 1932), and a law allowing the government to dissolve associations (October 1932). On the basis of these new legal regulations, the Camp of Great Poland was dissolved—this occurred by Pieracki's decision on March 28, 1933—and later, the press organ of the National Radical Camp, *Sztafeta*, was also shut down (June 13, 1934).

Pieracki was also perceived as an individual showing pro-fascist sympathies. For this reason, he was jokingly called Bronito Pieratini (an allusion to Benito Mussolini) by some of his colleagues. According to Julian Suski and Stanisław Cat-Mackiewicz, just before his death, Pieracki spoke with members of the National Radical Camp, attempting to persuade the nationalists to cooperate with the authoritarian wing of the BBWR. According to Andrzej Ajnenkiel, he was perceived at that time as a:

rising star of the camp, considered not without reason to be free from old sentiments toward the left, and at the same time a man whose concepts were close to the nationalism of the Endecja right…

At the same time, his statements opposing nationalism and placing state matters above national ones are well known (Note: For example: The only privilege of the Polish nation is that it constitutes the majority. From this privilege arises the duty for Poles to renounce nationalism in favor of a harmonious coexistence with national minorities. Another statement: But the Polish government is the mandatory of the interests of the Polish nation and will execute the demands of the Polish raison d'état against Ukrainian and Polish nationalism; nationality is indifferent to the state. Likewise to the law.). Writing about Pieracki's views, Janusz Gołota indicated that:

The general line of Pieracki's actions emerges clearly. A strong state, efficiently managed, resolute against the opposition. For the ruling party he represented, he sought broader right-wing support by imposing a platform of agreement on dictated terms; he extended a hand, but with a dictate. And hence, for example, he can be seen both as a supporter of Endecja and as its enemy.

Similar views were held by a group of Sanation politicians with a right-wing worldview closely associated with Pieracki (who advocated, among other things, for a hard line against the opposition), centered around Kurier Poranny, edited by the friend of the Minister of Internal Affairs, Wojciech Stpiczyński.

Pieracki was viewed positively by the German minority living in Poland—he placed no obstacles to the development of German social organizations in the Republic of Poland. The situation was similar with the Jewish population, as he decisively combated anti-Jewish incidents inspired by the National Democracy (Note: During one of the parliamentary debates, Pieracki spoke out against the racist stance of the Endecja on the Jewish question presented by Tadeusz Bielecki: This type of struggle is fundamentally alien to the spirit of our nation's history. Are we not capable of finding our own identity other than by shutting ourselves in the trenches of racism?). In March 1934, the Committee for Nationality Affairs was formally established under the Council of Ministers. Its tasks were, among others, to draft guidelines for nationality policy. It developed its full activity only after Pieracki's death. For the minister himself, however, an understanding with the Ukrainians was most important. For this purpose, he made a trip to Eastern Galicia between June 3 and June 9, 1934. Pieracki visited Lwów, Rzeszów, Łańcut, Przeworsk, and Rawa Ruska. He met, among others, with the Metropolitan of Lwów Andrzej Szeptycki and received a delegation of the Ukrainian population. In the minister's intention, the conversation with the clergyman, who was the informal leader of the Ukrainians in Poland, was to be the first step toward the normalization of relations with this national minority.

== Assassination ==
On 15 June 1934, Pieracki was assassinated by a member of the Organization of Ukrainian Nationalists. His death gave Poland's Sanation government a justification to create, two days after the assassination, the Bereza Kartuska Prison. The prison's first detainees were almost entirely the leadership of the Polish nationalist far-right National Radical Camp (the ONR), arrested on 6–7 July 1934.

Sentenced to death in the Pieracki assassination were Stepan Bandera, Mykola Lebed and Yaroslav Karpynets. Their sentences were commuted to life imprisonment, and both managed to escape during the German invasion of Poland. He was killed by the member of Organization of Ukrainian Nationalists (OUN), Hryhorij Maciejko.

== Honours and awards ==
- Order of White Eagle (posthumously, 17 June 1932)
- Silver Cross of the Virtuti Militari (1919)
- Grand Cross of the Order of Polonia Restituta
- Commander's Cross with Star of the Order of Polonia Restituta
- Cross of Independence (6 June 1931)
- Officer's Cross of the Order of Polonia Restituta (7 July 1925)
- Cross of Valour - four times
- Gold Cross of Merit (29 April 1925)
- Commemorative Medal for the War of 1918–1921
- Medal of the 10th Anniversary of Regained Independence
- Honorary Badge of the Airborne and Antigas Defence League
- Grand Cross of the Order of the Phoenix (Greece)
- Knight Commander of the Order of St. Gregory the Great (Holy See, 1925)
- Order of the Cross of the Eagle Class I (Estonia, 1934)

== See also ==
- Tadeusz Hołówko
- Mykola Lebed

== Bibliography ==
- Ajnenkiel, Andrzej (1980). Od rządów ludowych do sanacji: zarys dziejów politycznych II Rzeczypospolitej. Warszawa: Książka i Wiedza. ISBN 9788305111119.
- Czajka, Anna (2003). Samorząd terytorialny w Polsce w latach 1918-1939. Warszawa: Wydawnictwo Uniwersytetu Kardynała Stefana Wyszyńskiego.
- Garlicki, Andrzej (2008). Piękne lata trzydzieste. Warszawa: Prószyński i S-ka. ISBN 9788374697255.
- Gawryszczak, Marcin (2014). Bronisław Pieracki (1895–1934). Biografia polityczna. Łódź: Wydawnictwo Uniwersytetu Łódzkiego. ISBN 9788379691883.
- Gołota, Janusz (1995). Bronisław Pieracki: polityk, żołnierz, mąż stanu. Olsztyn: Wyższa Szkoła Pedagogiczna w Olsztynie.
- Lipowicz, Irena (2009). Prawo samorządu terytorialnego. Warszawa: Dom Wydawniczy ABC.
- Warzocha, Marek (2012). Ewolucja ustroju samorządu terytorialnego w Drugiej Rzeczypospolitej. Rzeszów: Wydawnictwo Uniwersytetu Rzeszowskiego.
