= Common Organization of the Society =

1935–1936 manuscript by Walery Sławek

- Author: Walery Sławek
- Original title: Powszechna Organizacja Społeczeństwa
- Language: Polish
- Subject: Political Philosophy
- Publication date: 1935-1936
- Publication place: Poland
- Media type: Manuscript
- Pages: 12

Common Organization of the Society (POS) (Polish: Powszechna Organizacja Społeczeństwa) was the unfinished project of social and political organization proposed by colonel Walery Sławek – a close associate of Józef Piłsudski and a key contributor to the April Constitution. The organization was to unite economic and professional self-governments and social organizations into a nationwide structure; it was to replace political parties in mediating between society and the state, and, according to some scholars, even have legal exclusivity to have a seat in the Sejm. The project was quashed by both Marshal Śmigły-Rydz and President Ignacy Mościcki, and Sławek himself eventually retired from political life.

== Origins of the POS ==
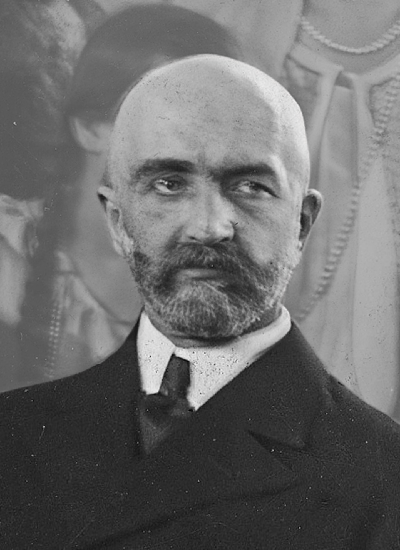
Walery Sławek was the author of the concept of a socialized state, which he tried to put into practice.

After the dissolution of the BBWR and the adoption of new constitutional provisions, there was a need to clarify the rules of social life. This issue had been the subject of Walery Sławek's reflections since the late 1920s. He emphasized that the state cannot cover all areas of public life, which is why some tasks should remain the responsibility of society. Both Sławek and other representatives of Piłsudski's camp, such as Wacław Makowski and Adam Skwarczyński, advocated harmonious cooperation between the state and society. According to Makowski, the authors of the April Constitution sought to transform the state from a tool of particular interests into a socialized state, with a clear distinction between the state and social spheres. The state was to unite citizens around the common good, while preserving the autonomy of the individual and the freedom of social development.

== Ideal of a socialized state ==
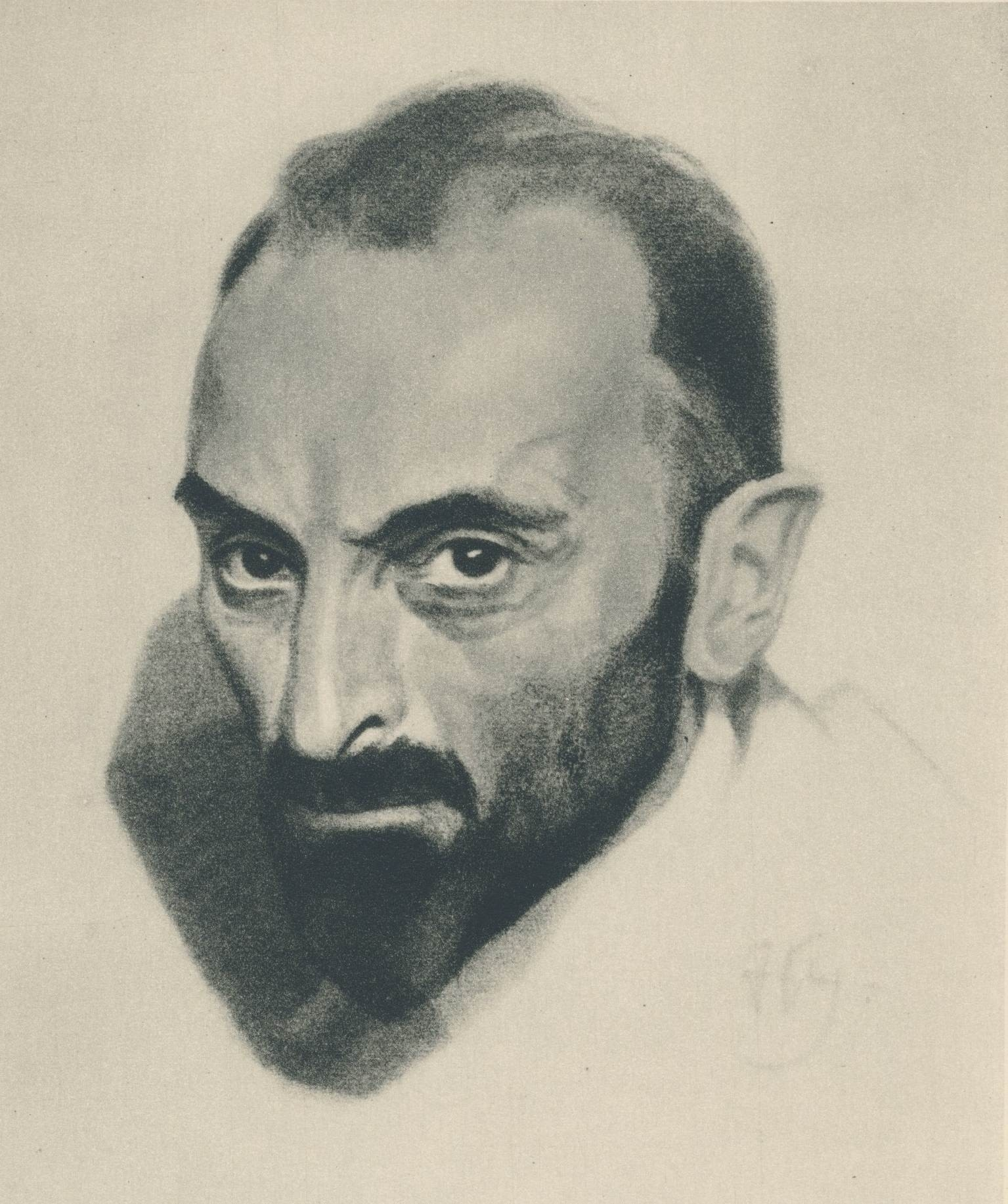
The idea of socialized state was developed by Adam Skwarczyński, the main theorist of the Piłsudski's camp.

The formula for a dynamically conceived structure of the state-social whole was to be the socialization of the state. This term (adopted by Colonel Walery Sławek) was based on the distribution of responsibility for the fate of the state to the entire society. This was to be done primarily through social organizations: educational, cultural and professional, bringing citizens together in teams for concrete, creative and free work. A special role - including in professional syndicates - should fall to the intelligentsia, a stratum - as Skwarczyński, confident in the moral strength of the Polish intelligentsia tradition, emphasizes - that is above class and inherently “state-forming.” For, unlike both the world of wage labor and the world of capital, the intelligentsia is bound to its profession not so much by material interest as by vocation, professional refinement and passion. Thanks to the educative influence of the intelligentsia, the worker can become, according to Skwarczyński (who stands here, let us note, on the antipodes of the views of the integral syndicalist Georges Sorel, known for his view that workers should liberate themselves from the influence of intellectuals, harmful to their cause), “not a mercenary for pay, but a creator perfecting his craft, loving his product and feeling his organic and moral connection to it.”

== The POS concept ==
After the dissolution of BBWR, Walery Sławek attempted to clarify the principles of the Sanation camp, which led to the concept of the so-called Common Organization of Society (POS). Its origins are unclear: according to some (Janusz Jędrzejewicz and Józef Winiewicz), the project was created at a specific moment, while others (Jan Hoppe) consider it to be the result of many years of reflection. The basic text of the program, dated at the turn of 1935 and 1936, was not published and was negatively assessed by Edward Śmigły-Rydz.

The POS was an extension of the idea of socialization of the state associated with Piłsudskiites. Its aim was to continue the reforms initiated by the April Constitution and to create a system of public representation without the mediation of political parties. The organization was to be based on municipal, county, and provincial structures, topped by a Sejm recruited from among distinguished activists.

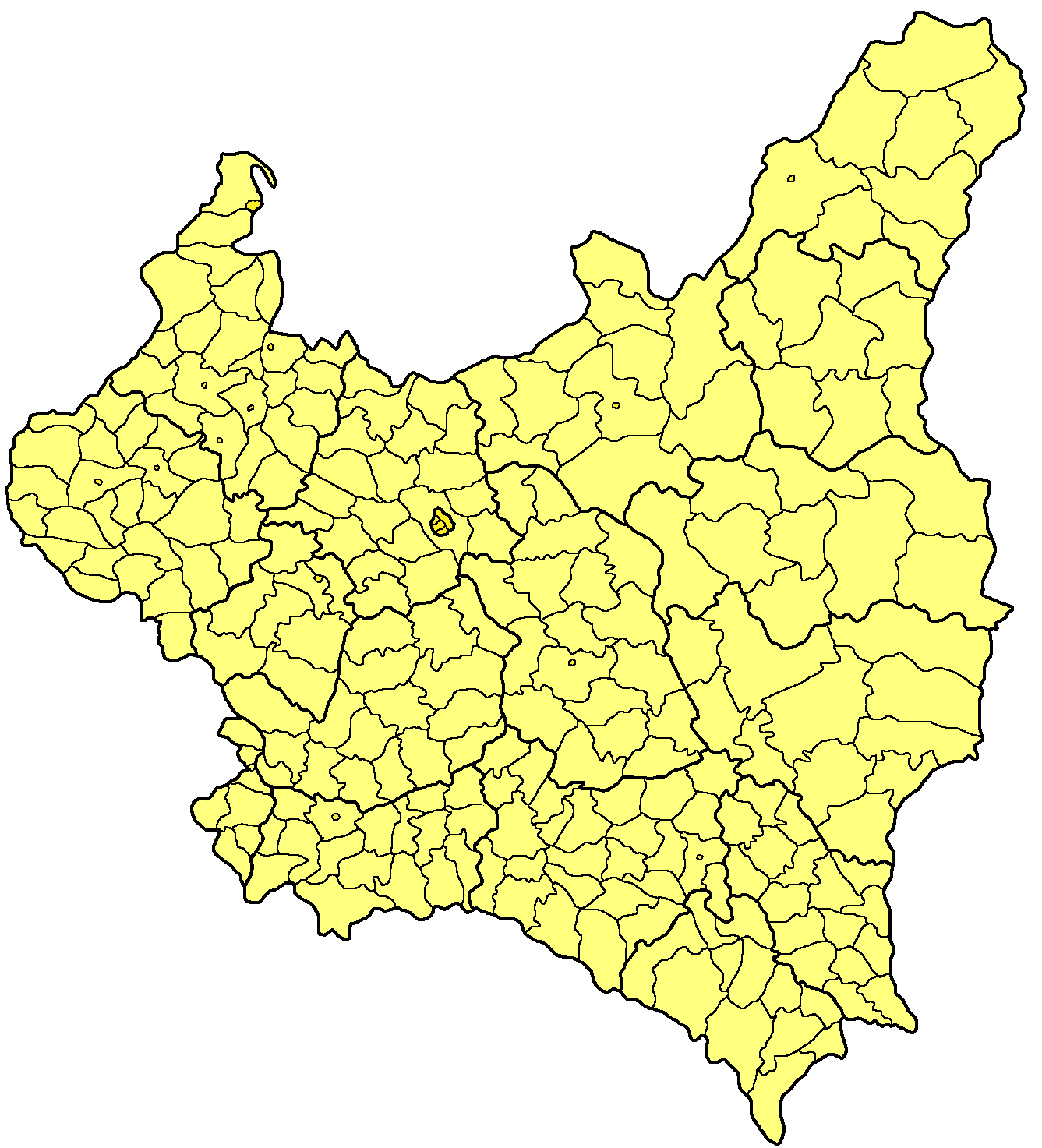
Administrative map of the Second Republic in 1938. Most likely, the POS was to be built from the gminas, counties and voivodship councils, and would be topped by a Sejm elected from among its most prominent representatives.

Sławek advocated grassroots, controlled self-organization of society. POS was to integrate organizations willing to cooperate, regardless of their political background, with the exception of opposition parties. It was to include local governments, economic and professional organizations, cooperatives, fire brigades, and trade unions combined into a single chamber of labor. National minority organizations were also to be given equal status. This would create a pyramid of municipal, district and provincial councils, topped by the Sejm as a POS executives. The political leadership of the Organization was to be formed by the “Colonels” and “Jutro Pracy” group.

The aim of the POS was to strengthen local social activity, promote honesty and work for the community, and push political parties into the background. The system was intended to be an alternative to both liberal democracy and totalitarian models.

== Fate of the POS project ==
At the turn of 1935–1936, Sławek sent out the text of the POS draft to various people for their opinions.This text was given by Sławek to Śmigły-Rydz, receiving in response a harsh letter that the General Inspector “does not see the purpose of such an organization.” This reaction, combined with Sławek's declining importance in the new political configuration of the Sanation's camp, caused him to abandon his attempts to put his concept into reality. He did not, however, cease further deliberations on the matter. His correspondence shows that in the summer of 1936 he began work on a text formulating, on the background of the history of the BBWR, remarks and conclusions “on the system of organization of the state.”

== Criticism of the POS ==
The POS concept is difficult to evaluate, as one would have to take into account the effects of implementation, and these sometimes differed from the intentions. This was vividly demonstrated by the fate of the electoral law developed by Sławek, which, while formally preserving democracy, in fact introduced, through the kitchen door so to speak, authoritarianism. Sławek believed that the ordinance would socialize the state, but in reality it placed elections under the control of the administration. In the words of Jan Hoppe:

“Practice has shown that an equation mark should be placed between [...] the voice of social organizations and the will of the governor.“

— Jan Hoppe

Sławek realized his mistake after the 1938 elections, when power passed into the hands of the OZN, and in the fall of that year, in an interview with "Słowo", he called for a change in the electoral law by deleting district assemblies.

== See also ==
- Walery Sławek
- Adam Skwarczyński
- Piłsudski's colonels
- Syndicalism
- Corporatism
  - Corporate statism
- Participatory democracy
- Estado Novo (Brazil)
- Third International Theory
