= Colonels' regime =

The term colonels' regime is often used as a generic term for any military rule by senior officers, synonymous with military junta.

Specifically, it can refer to either of two groups:

- Piłsudski's colonels of interwar Poland (1926–1939)
- The leadership of the Greek military junta of 1967–1974
