= Walery Sławek =

Prime Minister of Poland (1930, 1930–1931, 1935)

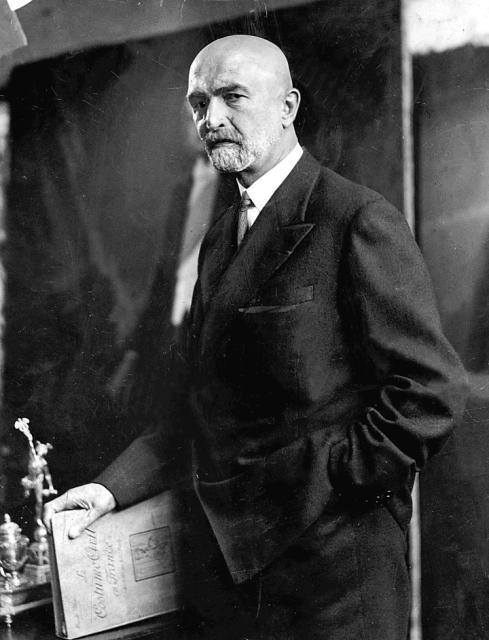
- Walery Sławek

Prime Minister of Poland
- In office 28 March 1935 – 12 October 1935
- President: Ignacy Mościcki
- Preceded by: Leon Kozłowski
- Succeeded by: Marian Zyndram-Kościałkowski
- In office 5 December 1930 – 26 May 1931
- President: Ignacy Mościcki
- Preceded by: Józef Piłsudski
- Succeeded by: Aleksander Prystor
- In office 29 March 1930 – 23 August 1930
- President: Ignacy Mościcki
- Preceded by: Kazimierz Bartel
- Succeeded by: Józef Piłsudski

6th Marshal of the Sejm
- In office 22 June 1938 – 27 November 1938
- President: Ignacy Mościcki
- Prime Minister: Felicjan Sławoj Składkowski
- Preceded by: Stanisław Car
- Succeeded by: Wacław Makowski

Personal details
- Born: Walery Jan Sławek; 2 November 1879 Strutynka, Podolia, Russian Empire
- Died: 3 April 1939 (aged 59) Warsaw, Poland
- Resting place: Powązki Military Cemetery
- Party: Nonpartisan Bloc for Cooperation with the Government
- Other political affiliations: Polish Socialist Party
- Occupation: Politician, soldier
- Nickname(s): Gustaw, Soplica

Military service
- Allegiance: Austria-Hungary (1914–1917); (Second Polish Republic) Poland (1918–1928)
- Branch/service: Polish Legions; Polish Army
- Years of service: 1914–1917 (Polish Legions); 1918–1928 (Poland)
- Rank: Captain (Polish Legions); Certified Colonel (Poland)

Walery Jan Sławek (Polish pronunciation: [vaˈlɛrɨ ˈjan ˈswavɛk]; 2 November 1879 – 3 April 1939) was a Polish politician, freemason, military officer and activist, who in the early 1930s served three times as Prime Minister of Poland. He was one of the closest aides of Polish leader, Józef Piłsudski.

== Early years ==
Walery Sławek was born on 2 November 1879 into an impoverished noble family, in the village of Strutynka in the region of Podolia, then part of the Russian Empire. He was one of four children: two of his older sisters died early of Tuberculosis. His father, Bolesław Sławek, worked at a sugar plant owned by Count Józef Mikołaj Potocki. His mother was Florentyna née Przybylska, and the Sławek family was distinctly related to the family of composer and politician Ignacy Jan Paderewski.

Between 1888 and 1894, he attended an elementary school in Nemyriv. In 1899, Sławek graduated from a trade school in Warsaw and began working for an insurance company. At that time, he became involved in the activities of several socialist organizations. In 1900, Sławek moved to Łódź as an employee for the insurance company Horodiczka i Stamirowski. Soon afterwards, he joined the Polish Socialist Party (PPS). While in Łódź, he was deeply involved in the activities of the PPS, which targeted the Tsarist authorities and struggled for Polish independence.

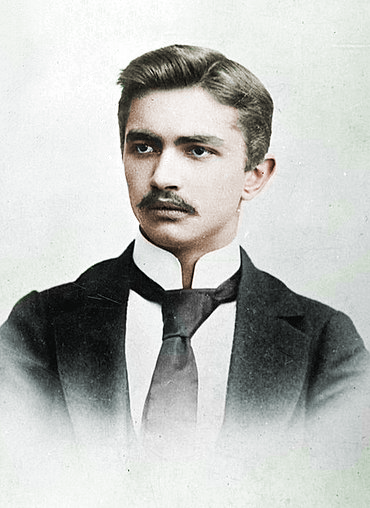
Young Walery Sławek, 1905 during the Revolution.

Upon returning to Warsaw (May 1901), Sławek was named one of the leaders of local branch of the PPS. He was frequently sent on missions to other cities of the Russian Empire. In Vilnius (1902), he met and became friends with the future Marshal of Poland, Józef Piłsudski, and Aleksander Prystor. In June 1902, Sławek was elected leader of the PPS for the Governorates of Kielce and Piotrków Trybunalski. At that time, he fell in love with Wanda Juszkiewicz, the stepdaughter of Józef Piłsudski. She became the love of his life, and after her premature death, Sławek did not become involved in any other relationship.

On 6 March 1903 he was for the first time arrested by Russian police, at a rail station in Będzin. Sent first to a prison in Piotrków Trybunalski, Sławek escaped on December 18, 1903, while being transferred to a prison in Sieradz. Soon afterwards, by the order of Piłsudski, he began working on the creation of a secret, paramilitary organization within the socialist party. On 13 November 1904 he organized a mass anti-Tsarist rally at Warsaw's Grzybowski Square. Sławek delivered weapons to some participants, and the rally ended in an exchange of fire with the police. It was the first act of armed resistance in Congress Poland since the January Uprising.

During the 1905 Congress of the PPS, Sławek was elected to the Central Workers Committee (CKR), as its youngest member. His main duty was coordination of local party chambers in southwestern corner of Congress Poland. Sławek himself never became a true Socialist: he regarded this party as the only real organization which would bring back independent Poland. During the Revolution of 1905, he was a key member of Combat Organization of the Polish Socialist Party, and participant in numerous missions. On 10 September 1905 he was arrested and sent to the Warsaw Citadel. Russian authorities planned to send him to Siberia, but on 19 October an amnesty was declared, and on 4 November 1905 Sławek was released. He continued his activities: during a raid on a train near Milanówek on 9 June 1906, a bomb exploded in his hand, injuring his head and chest. Sławek lost his left eye, three fingers in his right hand and two fingers in his left hand. Furthermore, he permanently lost hearing in his left ear, and for the rest of his life, Sławek wore a beard, which covered numerous scars on his face. Arrested again, he was acquitted by court and ordered to leave the Russian Empire.

Sławek left for Kraków, then located in Austrian Galicia. There, he underwent two operations, which improved his health. Nevertheless, he suffered from severe depression, caused both by the injuries, and the death of his wife. Józef Piłsudski ordered him to oversee party finances. In 1908, he was sent to Paris, and after his return, took part in the legendary Bezdany raid.

On 1 June 1909 Sławek, already a member of the Union of Active Struggle (ZWC), was arrested by the Austrian authorities. He was released after two weeks, with help from Austrian military intelligence (Hauptkundschaftstelle, HK-Stelle), which cooperated with the leadership of the ZWC. The Austrians highly appreciated the information on Russian army, stationed in Congress Poland. In exchange, the HK-Stelle allowed the ZWC to carry out its activities.

== World War I ==
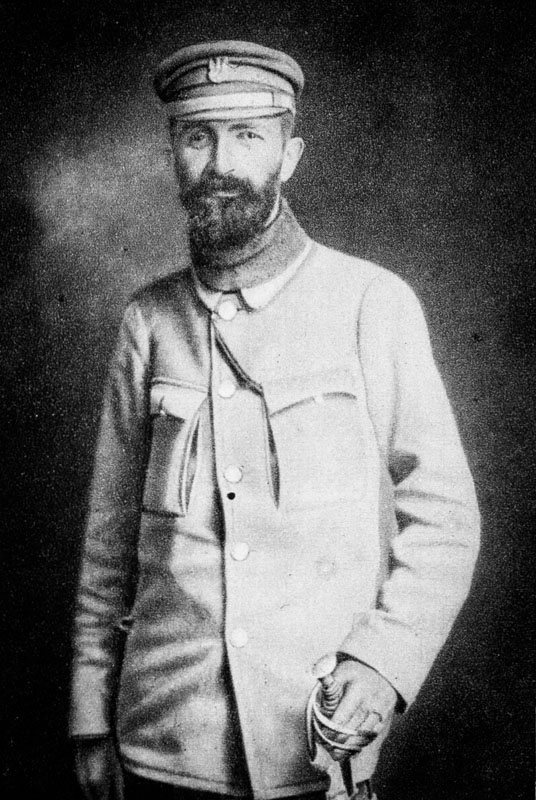
Sławek as a soldier in the Polish Legions, 1915

Sławek was one of the chief advisors of Piłsudski. In mid-1914, he joined 1st Brigade, Polish Legions, but in August, he did not march with First Cadre Company to Congress Poland, remaining in Kraków. In 1915, Sławek was sent by Piłsudski to Warsaw, where he created local structures of Polish Military Organisation (POW). At the same time, he formed a secret body within the POW, called Military Association (Zwiazek Wojskowy), later renamed into Organization A. In December 1916, after the creation of Provisional Council of State, Sławek was employed by its Military Commission. Following the Oath crisis, he was arrested by the Germans (13 July 1917) and sent to Warsaw Citadel and then to Szczypiorno and Modlin. He was finally released on 12 November 1918.

== Polish Army ==
On 1 January 1919 Sławek joined the 4th (Intelligence) Department of Polish General Staff. In May 1919, he was sent to the Lithuanian borderland, where he tried to reach an agreement with the Lithuanian general Silvestras Zukauskas. The purpose was to initiate a joint Polish-Lithuanian anti-Bolshevik front, but his attempt failed. In November 1919, he left for Tallinn, to negotiate with envoys of Estonian and Latvian governments. In January 1920, Sławek was sent to Ukraine, where he cooperated with Civil Commissar for Podolia and Volhynia, Antoni Minkiewicz. Promoted to major (22 April 1920), he was a Polish envoy to Ataman Symon Petliura. Together with Wacław Jędrzejewicz, he signed a military appendix to the Treaty of Warsaw (1920), between Poland and Ukrainian People's Republic. For the remaining part of Polish–Soviet War he remained in southeastern provinces of Poland, where he tried to create mixed, Polish-Ukrainian volunteer units.

Between 1922 and 1923, Sławek attended the Wyższa Szkoła Wojenna (military school) in Warsaw. After graduation and nomination to the rank of Officer of the General Staff, he was sent to Łódź on 15 October 1923, to the staff of 4th Military District. At that time, he became a Freemason. On 29 November 1923 Sławek was transferred to the Officer Reserve Corps, and on 30 June 1924 he became chairman of the Association of Polish Legionnaires, together with Adam Skwarczyński.

During 1926 May Coup (Poland), Sławek remained close to Piłsudski but did not take part in military activities. After the coup, he returned to active service, remaining in the army until 1928.

== In Polish government ==
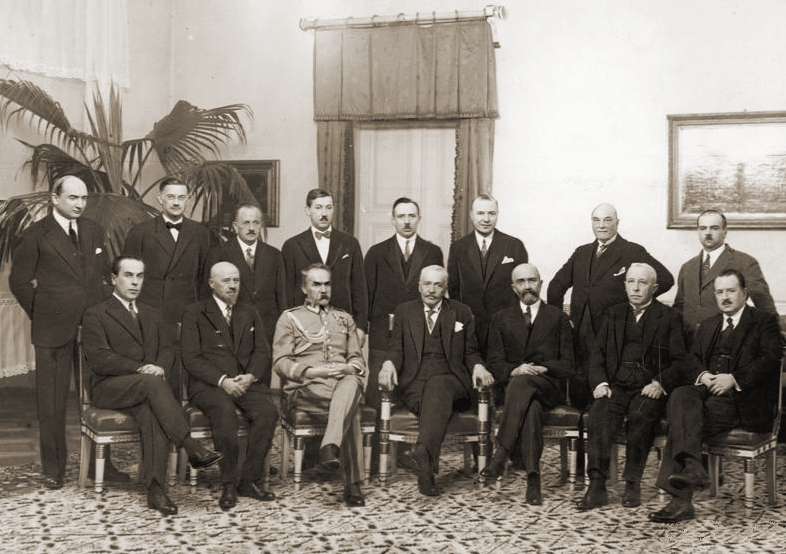
Polish government in 1930 (Sławek is sitting fifth from left)

Soon after the May Coup, Józef Piłsudski sent Sławek to the Tarnowski family's Dzików Castle, for a series of talks with members of Polish nobility. His mission was to convince them to support the Sanacja regime.

In the autumn of 1927, the informal “Council of Colonels” was created. It consisted of a group of close Piłsudski aides and was headed by Sławek. Its meetings took place at Sławek's Warsaw apartment. Before the 1928 Polish legislative election, Sławek came up with the idea of creating a new pro-government political body, the Nonpartisan Bloc for Cooperation with the Government (BBWR) of which he was the chairman. After the BBWR's victory in the election, Sławek was its main ideologist and one of the most influential persons in the country. One of the closest associates of Piłsudski, he was fanatically devoted to the Marshal, who called him the “Loyal Walery”. Sławek was one of the first ten persons awarded with the Cross of Independence with Swords.

After the collapse of the government of Kazimierz Bartel, on 29 March 1930, Sławek became Prime Minister of Poland as one of the so-called Piłsudski's colonels. His cabinet was almost identical to the government of Bartel, with Stanisław Car as Minister Justice, Leon Janta Połczyński as Minister of Agriculture and Felicjan Sławoj Składkowski as Minister of Interior.

The creation of the new cabinet resulted in deterioration of the relations between the government and the Sejm. The Centrolew coalition called for an extraordinary session of the Parliament, but President Ignacy Mościcki refused. On 30 June a massive anti-government rally took place in Kraków, the Congress for the Defense of Law and Freedom of People (Kongres Obrony Prawa i Wolnosci Ludu). The size of the Congress took the government by surprise, and on 23 August 1930 Sławek resigned, claiming that he was unable to be prime minister and chairman of the BBWR at the same time.

Following the so-called Brest Election, Sławek returned to the previous post and once again became the Polish Prime Minister (December 4, 1930). Due to the fact that in late 1930 and early 1931, Józef Piłsudski spent three months in Madeira, Sławek was de facto the most important person in Poland. He faced several difficulties: the economic situation of the country was worsening, the opposition fiercely attacked the cabinet, and the Pacification of Ukrainians in Eastern Galicia (1930) had just ended. Sławek urged members of the BBWR not to engage in any talks with the opposition, and the government quickly accepted a number of new regulations. At the same time, the case of Minister of Treasury, Gabriel Czechowicz, was dropped without ruling due to pressure from the regime.

On 26 May 1931 Sławek resigned his post, to be replaced by Aleksander Prystor. Sławek then devoted his time to writing a new Constitution of Poland, together with Kazimierz Świtalski and Stanislaw Car. The April Constitution of Poland was passed by the act of the Sejm on 23 April 1935. It introduced in Poland a presidential system with certain elements of authoritarianism.

On 28 March 1935 Sławek was, for the third time, named Prime Minister of Poland. On 13 July President Ignacy Mościcki awarded him with the Order of the White Eagle (Poland), for his work on the new Constitution. Since Sławek regarded himself as the new leader of Poland after the death of Józef Piłsudski (12 May 1935), President Mościcki decided to make a pact with Edward Śmigły-Rydz, in order to sideline Sławek and remove him from the government. In the second half of 1935, Sławek began to lose his position, to resign on 12 October 1935. Furthermore, on 30 October he decided to dissolve the BBWR. Soon afterwards, Ignacy Mościcki offered the seat of Prime Minister to Sławek, on the condition that Eugeniusz Kwiatkowski becomes his deputy. Sławek refused, and as a result, Marian Zyndram-Kościałkowski was named the new premier.

On 15 August 1935 deputies and senators of BBWR handed to Sławek a privately purchased manor house, located in the village of Janowiczki, near the site of the Battle of Racławice.

== Late 1930s ==
Walery Sławek planned to replace the dissolved BBWR with a new structure, called Common Organization of the Society (Powszechna Organizacja Społeczeństwa). His idea was harshly criticized by Edward Śmigły-Rydz, who sent to him a letter writing that there is no need for such a body to be formed. On 24 May 1936 Sławek was replaced by Adam Koc, who became new chairman of the Association of Polish Legionnaires. A few weeks later, he was named chairman of the Józef Piłsudski Institute of Modern History, a post, designed to keep him away from political life. This nomination was purely honorary and marked Sławek's decline.

On 11 November 1936 President Mościcki nominated Edward Śmigły-Rydz to the post of Marshal of Poland. Most of the so-called Piłsudski's Colonels refused presidential invitation to this event. Sławek himself decided to accept the invitation, but later stated that his promotion to Marshal was one of the saddest days of his life, as he was of the opinion that Józef Piłsudski was the only person worthy of that rank.

On 21 February 1937 the Camp of National Unity (OZN) was officially formed. It was yet another blow to Sławek's prestige, as in his opinion, the new party was designed to provide Śmigły-Rydz with unlimited power. On 22 June 1938, after the death of Stanisław Car, Sławek became the new speaker of the Sejm, with 114 deputies voting for him. The parliament, however, was dissolved by the President on 18 September. The new election took place on 6 November 1938 (see 1938 Polish legislative election). Sławek failed to win the seat in the parliament.

== Suicide ==
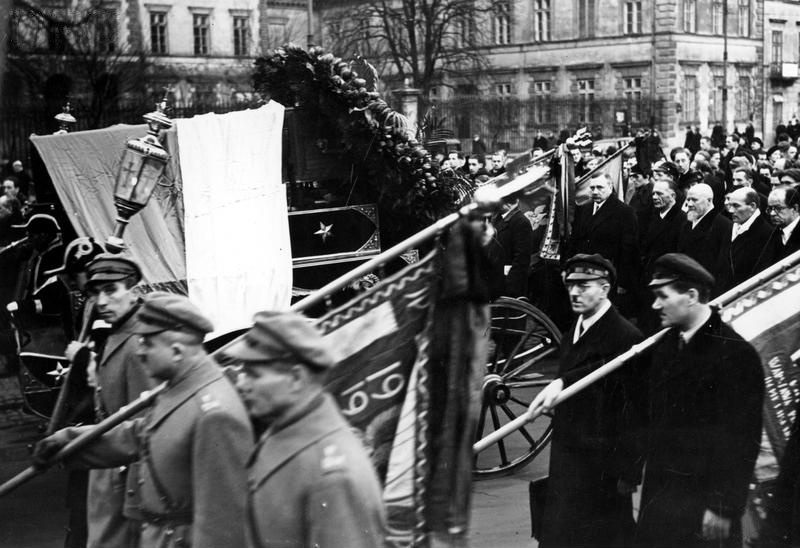
Funeral of Walery Sławek on 5 April 1939. Aleksander Prystor can be seen in the back.

On 2 April 1939 at 8:45 p.m. (the exact hour of Piłsudski's death), Sławek shot himself in the mouth at his Warsaw apartment, located on Jan Chrystian Szuch Avenue. Before the suicide, he wrote a farewell letter that said: “I am taking away my life. Please do not blame anybody. 2/IV. 1939. W. Sławek (...) I have burned all private papers, and those confined to me. If not all, please forgive me. God Almighty will perhaps forgive me my sins, including this final one”. Furthermore, he left a letter for President Mościcki, however, its contents have never been revealed.

The bullet was stuck in Sławek's palate, and he was taken to Józef Piłsudski Military Hospital. He underwent a blood transfusion, and then a two-hour surgery. His condition temporarily improved at approximately 4 a.m. on 3 April, but he died the same day at 6:45 a.m.

The funeral took place on 5 April at Warsaw Garrison Church. Sławek was buried at the Powązki Cemetery; among the pallbearers were Aleksander Prystor, Janusz Jędrzejewicz, Michał Tadeusz Brzek-Osinski and General Lucjan Żeligowski. The funeral was a demonstration of those followers of Piłsudski who opposed the Śmigły-Rydz's regime. The Marshal himself was present at the cemetery, but was unable to get closer to the coffin, prevented by the pallbearers, who blamed him for Sławek's death.

Until 1964, the body of Walery Sławek was kept at the Avenue of Notables. On 17 October 1964 it was moved to the quarter of soldiers of the Polish–Soviet War. In 1965, friends of Sławek's family decided to fund a stone monument. Wacław Jędrzejewicz, who was responsible for the collection of the money, contacted a number of influential people and organizations, including Generals Tadeusz Kasprzycki and Wacław Stachiewicz, Adam Koc, the Association of Wilno, Chicago's Polish Independence League and the Association of Formers Soldiers of the 5th Infantry Division. Currently, the remains of Walery Sławek are buried in the new spot, while his old tomb remains empty.

=== Reasons ===
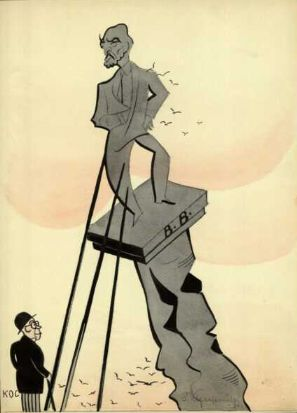
Caricature of Adam Koc and Walery Sławek, 1936

Polish writer and air-force pilot Mieczysław Pruszyński, in his book "The Secret of Piłsudski" ("Tajemnica Piłsudskiego") claims that Sławek's suicide was directly linked to the Anglo-Polish military alliance, and British guarantee to Poland, accepted by Józef Beck: "Sławek killed himself after British guarantee to Poland had been announced and accepted. This guarantee was developed into an alliance, which Adolf Hitler saw as casus belli. Sławek was of the opinion that such an alliance, aimed at the Third Reich, would end in a Polish-German war. The war against which Józef Piłsudski had warned until the last days of his life (...) When on 2 April Sławek found out that Beck had left for London, he committed suicide in the evening of the same day. For him, Beck's trip meant the war with Germany and the end of Poland" (Mieczysław Pruszyński, Tajemnica Piłsudskiego, Warszawa 1997). A few hours before his death, Sławek met with a man named Bogdan Podoski, to whom he said: "I know it, I feel that they are leading Poland to destruction, and I do not know how to react against it".

In 2004, in a Polish Newsweek article, historian Dariusz Baliszewski wrote that in early spring of 1939, a group of leading Polish political figures, such as General Kazimierz Sosnkowski, former Premier Leon Kozłowski and Kazimierz Puzak, planned a putsch, in which they wanted to get rid of Józef Beck, Ignacy Mościcki and Edward Śmigły-Rydz, whose recent change to anti-German and pro-British policies would lead to the destruction of Poland. Walery Sławek was to be elected new President of Poland, but the plot was revealed, and to avoid embarrassment, Sławek either killed himself or was murdered.

== Honours and awards ==
- Order of the White Eagle
- Silver Cross of the Virtuti Militari
- Independence Cross with Swords
- Cross of Valour - four times
- Order of the Cross of the Eagle, 1st Class (Estonia, 1934)

== See also ==
- Prometheism

Political offices
Preceded by Kazimierz Bartel	Prime Minister of Poland; 1930	Succeeded by Józef Piłsudski
Preceded by Józef Piłsudski	Prime Minister of Poland; 1930–1931	Succeeded by Aleksander Prystor
Preceded by Leon Kozłowski	Prime Minister of Poland; 1935	Succeeded by Marian Kościałkowski-Zyndram
