= Piłsudski's colonels =

Group that governed Poland, 1926–1939

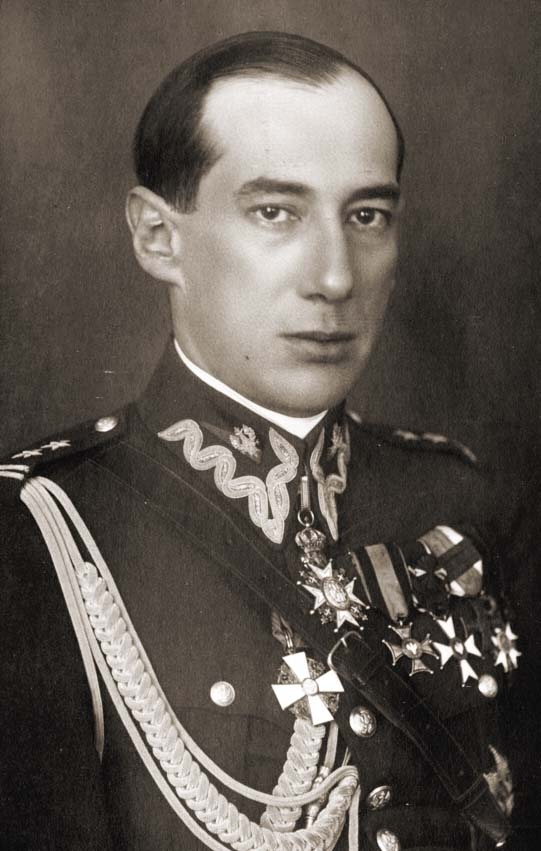
Colonel Józef Beck

Piłsudski's colonels, (Polish: pułkownicy) or the colonels' regime refers to the group of politicians who governed the Second Polish Republic from 1926 to 1939. Alternatively, the term refers to the regime following the death of Józef Piłsudski in 1935.

== Name ==
The term "Colonel's group" refers to a group of several dozen politicians with military backgrounds who were close to Marshal Piłsudski and, after the May Coup, became involved in political life outside the army structures. Many of these individuals were senior officers, though military rank was not a defining criterion, as not all members of the group held such a rank. The names most commonly associated with this group include: Walery Sławek, Aleksander Prystor, Kazimierz Świtalski, Bogusław Miedziński, Józef Beck, Janusz Jędrzejewicz, Wacław Jędrzejewicz, Adam Koc, and Ignacy Matuszewski. While this is not an exhaustive list, it represents the core of the group of soldier-politicians involved in governmental roles after 1926.

== History ==
Close allies of Józef Piłsudski, most of "the colonels" had served as officers in the Polish Legions and Polish Military Organisation (POW), and in the Polish Army (particularly during the Polish–Soviet War of 1919–1920, prior to Piłsudski's 1923 resignation as Chief of the Polish General Staff). They had held key, if not necessarily the highest, military ranks during Piłsudski's May 1926 coup d'état.

Later they became important figures in Piłsudski's Sanation movement and ministers in several governments. After the BBWR's 1930 electoral victory (the "Brest elections"), Piłsudski left most internal matters in the hands of his "colonels", while himself concentrating on military and foreign affairs.

The "colonels" included Józef Beck, Janusz Jędrzejewicz, Wacław Jędrzejewicz, Adam Koc, Leon Kozłowski, Ignacy Matuszewski, Bogusław Miedziński, Bronisław Pieracki, Aleksander Prystor, Adam Skwarczyński, Walery Sławek, and Kazimierz Świtalski.

The colonels' regime is divisible into three periods: 1926–1929, 1930–1935 and 1935–1939. During the first period, after the May 1926 coup, the colonels (and Sanation generally) consolidated their control over the government. The second period, following the 1930 "Brest elections", saw the colonels' regime under Piłsudski's guidance, with power exercised by his allies and friends such as Walery Sławek and Aleksander Prystor, both of whom had known Piłsudski since 1905 and had served in the Combat Organization of the Polish Socialist Party before World War I. After Piłsudski's death in 1935, the hardliner "colonels", led by Walery Sławek, lost influence to the Castle faction of Ignacy Mościcki and Edward Rydz-Śmigły. Nevertheless, the "colonels' regime" and Sanation still dominated the Polish government from 1935 to the German invasion of Poland, in September 1939. Some scholars draw a distinction between the "Piłsudski period" (1926–35) and the "colonels' period, proper" (1935–39).

From 1937, the colonels' new political front would be the Camp of National Unity (OZON). In that last period, the Polish government, a "dictatorship without a dictator", to bolster its popular support, paradoxically adopted some of the nationalistic anti-minority policies that had been opposed by Piłsudski and advocated by his most vocal adversaries, the National Democrats.

== See also ==
- Józef Piłsudski's cult of personality
- Military dictatorship
- Piłsudskiite

== Sources ==
- Wereszycki, H. (1968). "Towards a Total Dictatorship (1931-1939)". In History of Poland, Warsaw, 1968, pp. 689–709.
