= Kazimierz Bartel =

Polish politician and scientist

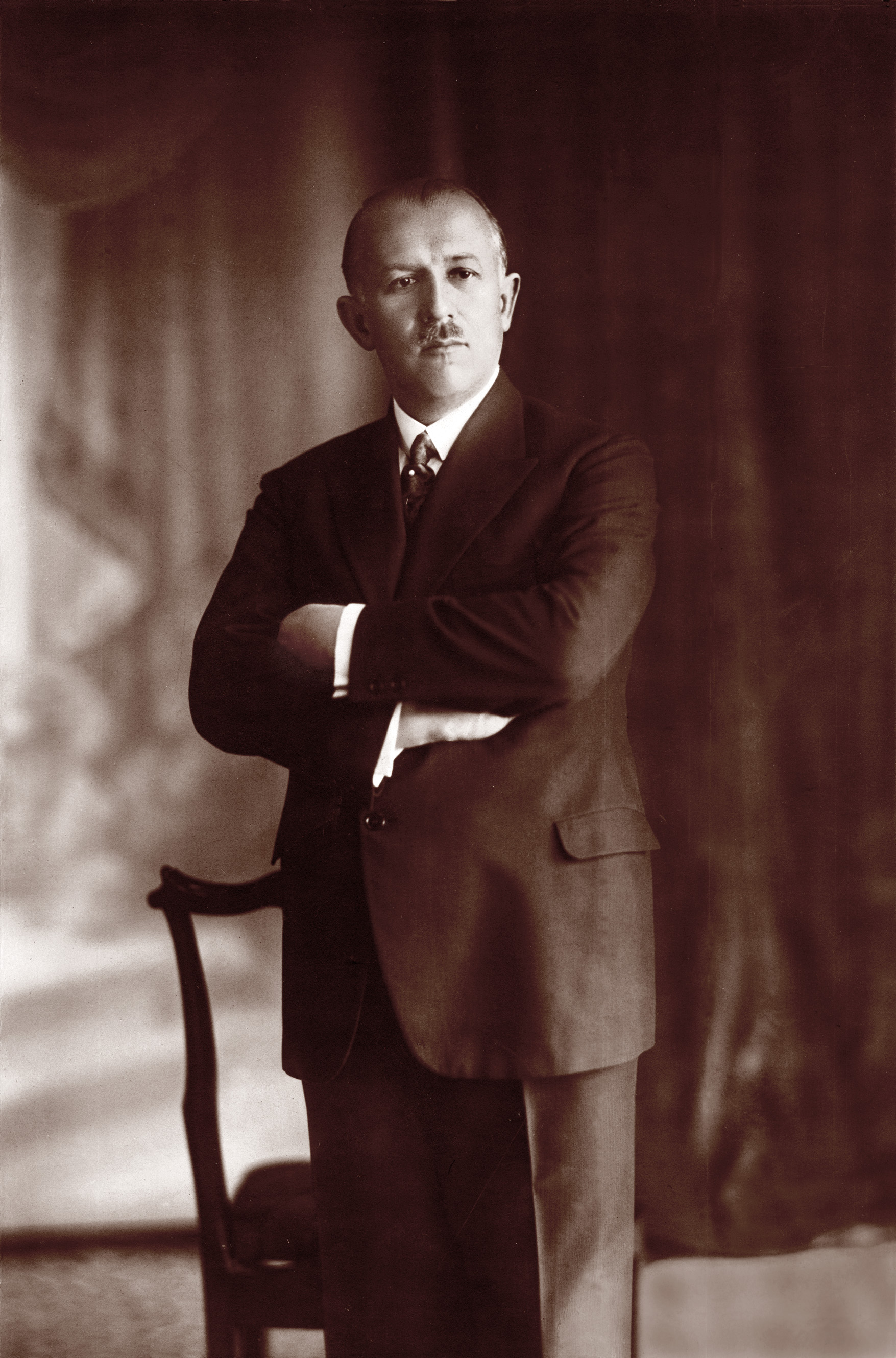
- Bartel in 1929

Prime Minister of Poland
- In office 29 December 1929 – 17 March 1930
- President: Ignacy Mościcki
- Preceded by: Kazimierz Świtalski
- Succeeded by: Walery Sławek
- In office 27 June 1928 – 14 April 1929
- President: Ignacy Mościcki
- Preceded by: Józef Piłsudski
- Succeeded by: Kazimierz Świtalski
- In office 15 May 1926 – 30 September 1926
- President: Maciej Rataj (Acting); Ignacy Mościcki
- Preceded by: Wincenty Witos
- Succeeded by: Józef Piłsudski

Personal details
- Born: Kazimierz Władysław Bartel; 3 March 1882 Lemberg, Kingdom of Galicia and Lodomeria, Austria-Hungary
- Died: 26 July 1941 (aged 59) Lemberg, General Government
- Party: BBWR
- Spouse: Maria Bartlowa
- Occupation: Member of Parliament; Statesman; Mathematician; Scholar; Diplomat; Freemason
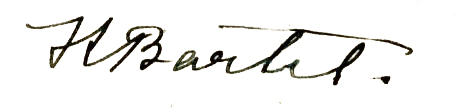
- Signature

Kazimierz Władysław Bartel (Polish pronunciation: [kaˈʑimjɛʐ vwaˈdɨswav ˈbartɛl]; English: Casimir Bartel; 3 March 1882 – 26 July 1941) was a Polish mathematician, freemason, scholar, diplomat and politician who served as 15th, 17th and 19th Prime Minister of Poland three times between 1926 and 1930 and a Senator of Poland from 1937 until the outbreak of World War II.

Bartel was appointed Minister of Railways between 1919 and 1920, in 1922–1930 he was a member of Poland's Sejm. After Józef Piłsudski's May Coup d'état in 1926, he became prime minister and held this post during three broken tenures: 1926, 1928–29, 1929–1930. Bartel was the Deputy Prime Minister between 1926–1928 and Minister of Religious Beliefs and Public Enlightenment, when Piłsudski himself assumed the premiership, however, Bartel was in fact "de facto" prime minister during this period as Piłsudski did not concern himself with the day-to-day functions of the cabinet and the government.

In 1930 upon giving up politics, Bartel returned to the university as professor of mathematics. In 1930 he became rector of the Lwów Polytechnic and was soon awarded an honorary doctorate and membership in the Polish Mathematical Association. In 1937 he was appointed a Senator of Poland and held this post until World War II.

After the Soviet invasion and occupation of eastern Poland, Bartel was allowed to continue lecturing at the Technical Institute. In 1940 he was summoned to Moscow and offered a seat in the Soviet parliament.

On 30 June 1941, in the course of Operation Barbarossa, the German Wehrmacht entered Lwów and began persecuting the local intelligentsia. Bartel was imprisoned two days later by the Gestapo and offered the top post in a Polish puppet government. His ultimate refusal of the German terms was taken as an act of treason by the Germans. By order of Heinrich Himmler, Bartel was murdered on 26 July 1941, shortly after the Massacre of Lwów professors had ended.

== Early life and studies ==
Kazimierz Władysław Bartel was born on 3 March 1882 in Lemberg, Austria-Hungary (later Lwów, Poland, now Lviv in Ukraine) as the son of Michał Bartel and Amalia Chadaczek. Growing up in a working-class family, he graduated from elementary school in Stryj. His railwayman father arranged Bartel to be an apprentice to fitter who taught in craft school. This allowed Bartel to continue his formal education while working as an apprentice.

After completing secondary school in 1901, Bartel studied mechanics at the Lwów Polytechnic in the Mechanical Engineering Department. He graduated summa cum laude in 1907 and soon started working for his alma mater as an assistant in descriptive geometry to Placyd Zdzisław Dziwinski. From 1908 to 1909, he also studied mathematics and philosophy at the Franciscan University in Lviv and at the Ludwig-Maximilians-Universität München. The travel grant to Munich allowed him to attend the lectures on art history by Karl Dochlemann and mathematics by Aurel Voss and Alfred Pringsheim.

Bartel returned to the Polytechnic and earned his doctor of technical sciences in 1909. His dissertation "O utworach szeregów i pęków inwolucyjnych" (Compositions series and involution pencils) allowed him to become one of the first title holders of such doctoral within Austria-Hungary. Bartel gave his habilitation thesis "O płaskich utworach inwolucji stopnia czwartego szeregu zerowego" (On planar products of involution of the fourth series of the zero degree) in 1912, then received the title of associate professor. Bartel became the chair of descriptive geometry after the retirement of Mieczysław Łazarski in 1911 due to blindness. Bartel attained the title of professor of mathematics at the Lwów Polytechnic in 1917.

Conscripted into the Austro-Hungarian Army during World War I, after the collapse of Austria-Hungary in 1918 Bartel returned to Lwów, which became part of the newly established Second Polish Republic. In 1919, as commander of railway troops, he fought in the defence of the city against the Ukrainian siege. Meanwhile, Bartel wrote his first textbook on descriptive geometry and befriended and later supported Poland's future leader, marshal and commander-in-chief, Józef Piłsudski. Since May 1919 he served as the manager of the Armoured Trains Construction Management and Association. His numerous successes in this field led to Prime Minister Leopold Skulski appointing him the Minister of the Railway system of the Republic of Poland. Bartel met other significant and influential politicians and diplomats, most notably Prime Minister Wincenty Witos and Prime Minister Władysław Grabski. After the Polish–Soviet War of 1920, Bartel was nominated as a lieutenant colonel and was left in charge of the railway reserve officers and the Lwów militia. He was awarded a Virtuti Militari cross, a Polish distinction for valor, after the armed conflict.

In 1921, Bartel spent six months traveling to museums and galleries in France, Italy, Switzerland and Austria to research on art. Most of his holidays were spent likewise because of his interest stemming from Dochlemann's lectures. He accumulated a good personal archive of notes and photographs for this interest of his.

== Political and diplomatic career ==
In 1922, Bartel was elected a member of Poland's Sejm (parliament) and held that position until 1929. Initially, he was a member of the party PSL "Liberation", but he was not satisfied with the radicalization of the group. In March 1925 at the Congress of the Polish People's Party, he decided to adopt, among others, a reform without compensation. Bartel eventually left the party and the organisation in April 1925, along with Marian Zyndram-Kościałkowski and Bolesław Wysłouch and later founded the parliamentary "Labour Club". This organization quickly came under the direct influence of commander-in-chief Józef Piłsudski. Just before the May Coup of 1926, Bartel received an order from Marshal Piłsudski to prepare for a takeover as prime minister after the expected collapse of President Stanisław Wojciechowski and his government.

=== First term in office, first government (1926) ===
On 15 May 1926, after the resignation of the government led by Wincenty Witos and President Wojciechowski after the May Coup, Bartel was appointed by Marshal of the Sejm and the acting head of state Maciej Rataj as the prime minister of the Second Polish Republic, but Bartel later stated in his inauguration speech that he would be the head of government only until the election of a new president. His decision was possibly influenced by the fact that he suffered from kidney and stomach problems and was constantly in pain. One member of the parliament stated, "He was a cheerful and ambitious man, but always in pain. Even his opponents in the Sejm admitted that in personal relationships, it is extremely hard not to be in favour of a man like Bartel. As prime minister, he tried to aid every man possible, even the men and women that opposed his policies and the government, but he was not able to help himself, which led to his early decline in politics and diplomacy of the Polish Republic. He was of weak stature and of weak health and would hardly make a good impression on the public, especially the socialists or communists in the east and therefore, this would not make him an influential Prime Minister nor a diplomat supporting democracy."

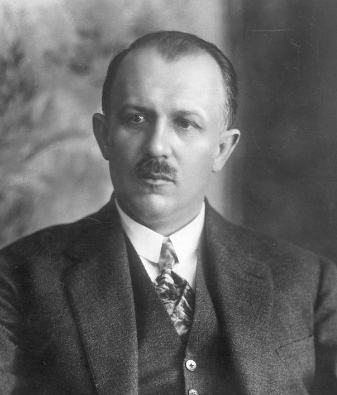
Prime Minister Kazimierz Bartel, 1928

Bartel's new government consisted mostly of people not connected with any political parties (four of those politicians already were occupied ministerial positions). Bartel was described as ideologically centrist: Prime Minister's newly established office was occupied by both the right-wing and left-wing leaders. Bartel himself took over the Ministry in turn and Piłsudski the Minister of War. Such a system churned mainly the Polish Socialist Party, which supported the May Coup. On 16 May 1926, Prime Minister Bartel made a statement in which he highlighted the principles of his policies. Bartel stated that the cabinet took power in accordance with the law, without any prejudice to the constitutional order. He also called for peace, hard work and dedication to the Polish nation. At the same time, he promised the immediate removal of incompetent and corrupt politicians from any high posts that could negatively influence the future economic growth of the Second Polish Republic. Bartel's closest personal advisor in politics and diplomacy was Marshal Józef Piłsudski, who was in favour of the new minister.

Bartel suggested that Ignacy Mościcki should become a candidate for the post of head of state (president), who was also a professor at the Lwów Polytechnic. Bartel's first government was one of the most active in the history of Poland; the politicians and members of parliament gathered every second day and on occasions everyday to discuss political matters. On 4 June 1926, Ignacy Mościcki was elected the president of the Second Polish Republic, and Bartel resigned along with the entire cabinet, but soon after being appointed, President Mościcki designated him again to become prime minister.

=== Second and third government (1926) ===
On 8 June 1926, three days after the Mościcki's designation, Bartel formed his second cabinet. On the same day, Józef Piłsudski sent a letter to the head office in which he outlined the conditions of re-entry to the parliament. After his second election, Bartel primarily focused on the restoration of the decree based on the organization of the highest military authorities from 7 January 1921, which enables the free management of the Ministry of War without the vote of the government and the parliament. On 9 June 1926, the decree was officially restored, however, another decree was adopted, which increased the power of the president or head of state over the ministry. Bartel met with representatives of the parliamentary clubs and highlighted in a conversation with them his commitment towards the parliamentary system but also pointed out a more concerning issue:the economic development of the country. At a private meeting with senators, he highlighted his determination and involvement in fighting against bureaucracy, the introduction of an apolitical army and the elimination of the Ministry of Public Works. He vividly stated that before the May Coupn there was no democracy and that Poland was ruled by an oligarchy, nobles and influential leaders of wealthy privately owned clubs and parties.

The supporters of Bartel and his government emphasized his efficiency when they managed the state. His opponents, however, saw it as a tool to limit the role of the Polish Parliament and accused him of deliberate dictatorship and control over the ministers in his "private parliament sittings" - the so-called Sejm Bartlowy (Bartel's Parliament). Bartel was appointed prime minister when Marshal Piłsudski undertook an attempt to communicate with the rebellious senators and members of the Sejm. Bartel himself was considered to be representative of the liberal tendencies in the party and a spokesman of the Sanacja movement. Otherwise the post of the head of government (Prime Minister) was taken by Kazimierz Świtalski or Walery Sławek, both of whom were considered to be uncompromising supporters of the conflict with the parliament.

Bartel's government contributed to a marked improvement in administration, which was primarily caused by the Prime Minister's organizational skills and knowledge. He created an efficient system of government action in connection with the Sejm and officials of lower rank: "The ministers of the previous governments generally considered themselves as autonomous rulers, which influenced the private interests of the members of different parties in charge. The government of Kazimierz Bartel was never focused or concentrated on any political ties and friendships. The officials of the Prime Minister were to validate the efficiency of each ministry. Each minister was responsible for the operation of his office and ministers could not engage in any political activities. Before his speech in the parliament on any topic, he had to submit the text to the Prime Minister himself for approval. Bartel demanded such procedures from every minister and senator of his cabinet and personally prepared the agenda for each meeting of the government and disallowed to discuss any topic without his permission or consent."

Bartel also tried to improve the situation of the Polish Jews and the Jewish minority around the country. He was determined to eliminate the remnants of regulations dating back to the times of Tsar Nicholas II of Russia and Congress Poland, focused on the persecution of religious minorities, especially the Jews and the Gypsies. Bartel's cabinet announced that it is against such inhumane procedures and actions, and in 1927 the Prime Minister gave permission to adopt a law officially recognizing and granting rights to the Jewish communities. Bartel was also against enforcing certain laws to the nature of the economic sanctions imposed on the Jews.

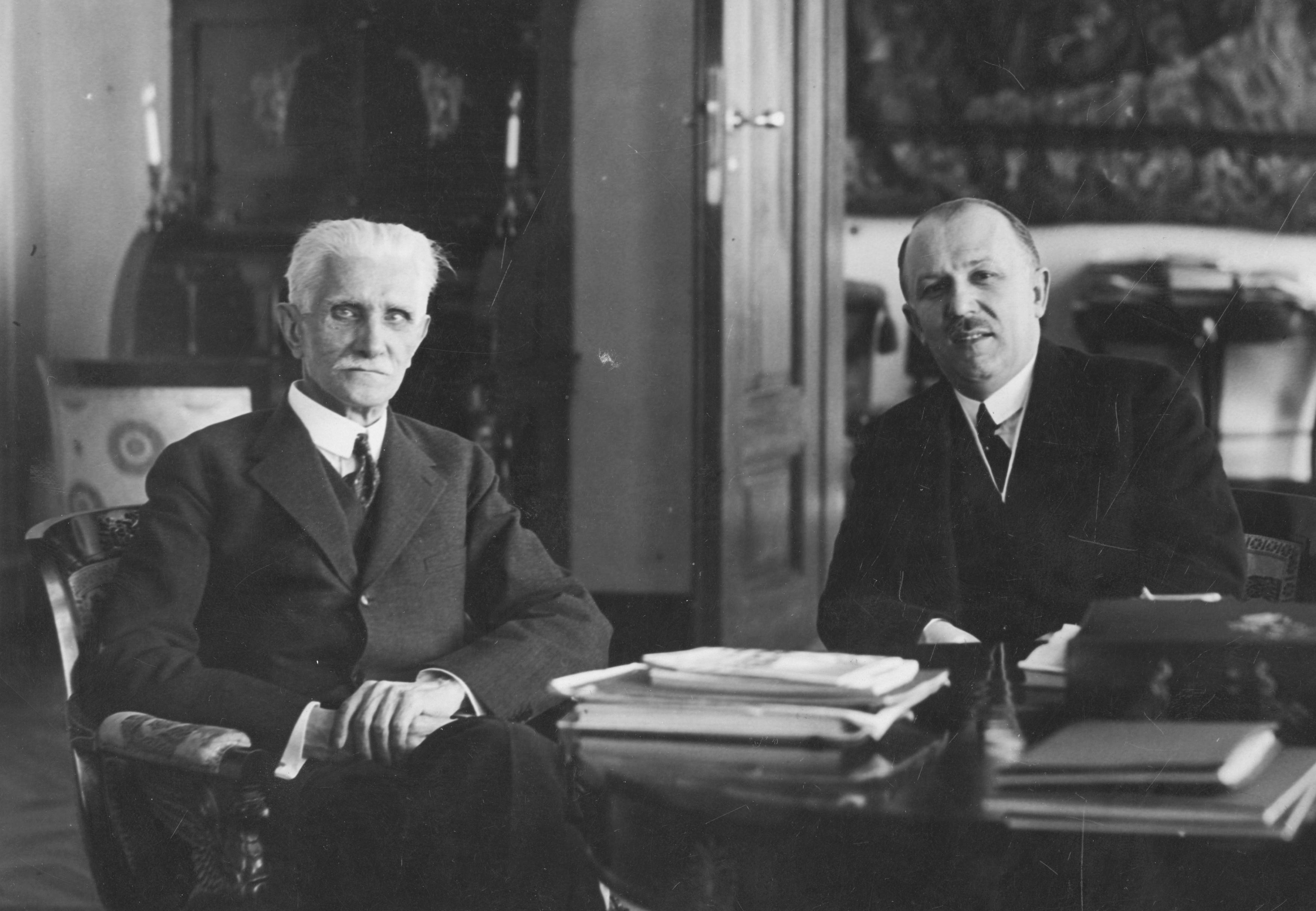
Bartel (right) with Marshal of the Sejm Ignacy Daszyński, 1929

On 2 August 1926, the Parliament adopted an amendment to the Constitution (the so-called "August Novella"), significantly strengthening the role of the president. On 20 September 1926 the Christian Democratic Party raised a vote against two ministers in the government of Bartel: Antoni Sujkowski and Kazimierz Młodzianowski. The party accused them of carrying out political purges in the state administration. Eventually, the vote was passed by the government, which forced Bartel and his cabinet to resign, but Marshal Piłsudski ordered President Mościcki to appoint Bartel as prime minister. Once more, that was not in violation of the Constitution, but the anti-parliamentarian speakers and the socialist politicians, confused with the frequent changes in the administration and the government, threatened the Sejm and even suggested a rebellion or another coup. The conflict made Bartel's third new cabinet last only four days.

On 30 September at the Belvedere palace in Warsaw, the council was holding a meeting in the study room, during which it was decided to dissolve the third government. Therefore, Bartel received the document on this subject, which for its validity required President Mościcki's signature. Meanwhile, the Senate immediately demanded that the parliament passes the budget cut policy proposed by the Upper House. Bartel told the Speaker of the Sejm Maciej Rataj, that in such a situation he will personally take the decree to Mościcki and ask for his signature. After the Sejm passed the budget cut policy, Bartel arrived at Mościcki's private residence, but to his surprise, Mościcki refused to sign the document allowing the dissolution. Instead, he ordered Bartel to terminate his employment. Bartel was once again forced to resign, but this time his cabinet would stay intact and his place would be taken by the marshal himself. The former prime minister was very bitter about this turn of events, despite the fact he went along with Piłsudski's and Rataj's plans. In its course, the Marshal warned that, in contrast to the previous government, he will not be "competing" with the ministers and if necessary he will use force if the members would not agree to his radical policies.

=== Collaboration with Piłsudski's Council ===
Following his resignation, Bartel was to become the Deputy Prime Minister and Minister of Religious Denominations and Public Enlightenment in Piłsudski's own, private council that operated in case of any unexpected conflict with the current operating government. The Marshal did not devote much attention towards his cabinet, focusing primarily on military and foreign policies. It was Kazimierz Bartel that was to replace the Marshal and take over his duties if absent and become the Speaker of the Sejm. He often spoke, as a representative of the government, on matters related to the budget and finances. These topics were possibly the main subject of a dispute between the "Piłsudskites" and the parliamentary opposition.

After the elections in March 1928, Piłsudski decided that Bartel should be appointed to the position of Speaker of the Sejm. On 27 March the "Nonpartisan Bloc for Cooperation with the Government" (BBWR), an ostensibly non-political organization that existed from 1928 to 1935, closely affiliated with Józef Piłsudski and his Sanacja movement, declared Bartel's candidacy. However Piłsudski's plan to place Bartel in charge of the Sejm and nominate him as Marshal Speaker failed, because the senators and members of parliament decided to choose Ignacy Daszyński of the Polish Socialist Party as the Marshal of the Sejm instead. In protest, following the results of the vote, the members and supporters of the parliamentary BBWR party left the room.

The year 1928 also marked the release of Bartel's first book "Perspektywa Malarska". It dealt with the basic theory of perspective and its extension to architecture and art. It was published by Ksiaznica-Atlas, a publisher in Lwów who provided the negatives for the German translation published by B.G. Teubner in 1934.

=== Second term in office (1928–1929) ===
As soon as the new government was formed without Bartel as its head, Józef Piłsudski, temporarily serving as Prime Minister of the country, resigned. He decided, however, that his position will be taken over by Bartel, considered his most trusted and most loyal friend and supporter among the members of the party, although this change was only formal – Bartel was already responsible for leading the ongoing work of the Council of Ministers, even if he was not the Head of Cabinet. Piłsudski's decision greatly dissatisfied the senators of parliament, who would simply demonstrate their anger by not participating in the sessions and sittings of the Sejm. Some politicians dared to even throw rotten food at the ministers that were leaving the voting chamber. The situation worsened in the upcoming months and some ministers raised concerns about their safety, as some demonstrators, often made up of ordinary citizens working on the behalf of the party, tended to physically abuse officials traveling from their homes to the newly constructed government building located on Wiejska Street in Warsaw. Similar events occurred during the inauguration of the first President of the Second Polish Republic, Gabriel Narutowicz, in December 1922. The politicians and ministers were advised to travel with guards, police or at least a weapon that they could defend themselves with, however, the use of weapons may have strengthened the unity of the opposition and of the demonstrators that could use this as an act of violence against the common people and a violation of social democracy.

After the beginning of the so-called "Czechowicz affair" in which the opposition discovered that the Chancellor of the Exchequer Gabriel Czechowicz, a strong admirer of Piłsudski, passed 8 million Polish złoty from the state budget for the BBWR campaign between 1927 and 1928, on 12 February 1929 the members of an anti-Sanacja movement have requested to place both Czechowicz and Bartel before the State Tribunal (Court). In protest against this decision, Kazimierz Bartel informed the press of his intention to resign. He also stated that in his opinion the Czechowicz affair was caused by the Parliament and its senators rather than by the doings of one politician. On 13 April 1929 Bartel ordered his government to resign. He was replaced by Kazimierz Świtalski, a stubborn and self-centred man considered to be the cause of relentless struggle with the parliamentary opposition. The following months were marked by disputes between the newly formed government and the Sejm. Bartel's new cabinet began operating on 5 November 1929, however, its first sitting occurred in December on the orders of President Mościcki. After this, the Parliament adopted a motion of no confidence against Świtalski's Cabinet. Kazimierz Bartel became the prime minister once again.

=== Third term in office (1929–1930) ===
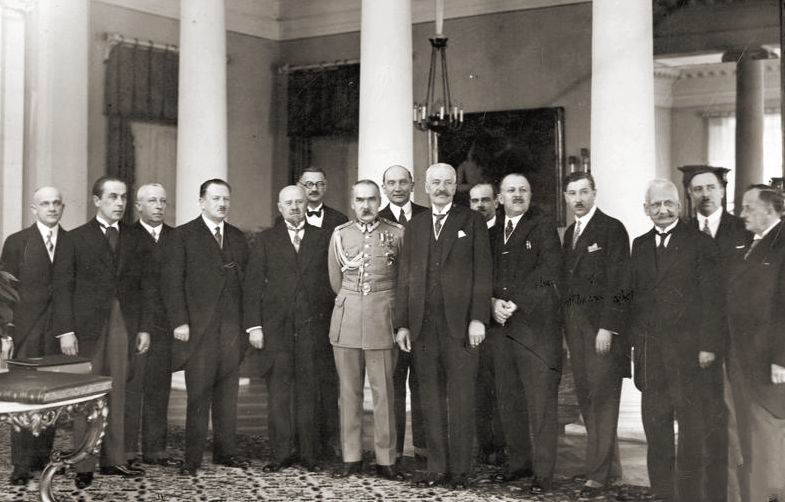
Bartel's fifth cabinet, December 1929. In center: Józef Piłsudski and Ignacy Mościcki.

On 29 December 1929, Bartel was chosen for the third time to be prime minister and formed his fifth government and cabinet, however, he performed his duties with large uncertainties, mainly due to poor health. He had a kidney illness and had a ureterolithotomy with help from Tadeusz Pisarski, a urologist he befriended during their conscription in the army. He also suffered from depression and anxiety probably due to the constant disputes with the Sejm and its senators. On 10 January he appeared at a meeting with members of parliament, declaring his willingness to cooperate with the senators and the Sejm, saying "I come with good will and determination gentlemen!" Bartel initially managed to establish cooperation with the Sejm, which resulted in the stabilization of the entire situation and conflict. Later, however, the relations between the cabinet and the parliament deteriorated again. The apogee of another dispute was a request for the adoption of no-confidence motion against the Minister of Labour and Social Welfare Aleksander Prystor. That was done primarily through the initiative of the Polish Socialist Party headed by Ignacy Daszyński and his supporters like Bolesław Limanowski, a Polish socialist politician, historian journalist and advocate of agrarianism who was the oldest member of the Polish Senate until his death in 1935 at the age of 99.

On 12 March Bartel gave a speech in the Senate sharply attacking the senators, which were "not able to fulfill the tasks set in order to control the state and the country and that their stubbornness and pride in themselves was an astonishing blow to both the economy and the policies of Poland." He also stated that "being a member of parliament is a profession. It does not require the members to acquire any skills and create new damaging campaigns, only to obey the ruling party. A man focused only on work and career often becomes a man in conflict with others, which entails long political consequences." Bartel believed that the motion of no confidence towards one member of the Senate was the lack of support of the entire government. On 15 March 1930, he decided to leave the office and his resignation was accepted by the president the next day. Soon, he also resigned from his parliamentary seat and left politics. Walery Sławek was appointed the new prime minister of Poland.

== Post-candidacy and return to university ==
After retiring from political life, he returned to the Technical University of Lwów (Polytechnic). In the same year he was elected rector of the university and held that office in the academic year of 1930/1931. He was also awarded an honorary doctorate and membership of the Polish Academy of Sciences: in the years 1930-1932 he was president of the Polish Mathematical Society. During this time he published his most important works, including a series of lectures on the perspective of European painting. It was the first such publication in the world. During his work at the Technical University of Lwów, he expressed strong opposition to plans focused on introducing the so-called "ghetto benches" for students of Jewish origin and ethnicity to separate them from Polish and Christian peers. His opinions, as well as other actions against anti-Semitic students, made Bartel the subject of numerous attacks including throwing eggs and rotten food at the professor or bringing a pig with the sign "Bartel" by Polish nationalists to the university grounds.

In 1932, he testified as a witness in the Brest trials, lasting from 26 October 1931 to 13 January 1932, held at the Warsaw Regional Court where leaders of the Centrolew, a "centre-Left" anti-Sanacja political opposition movement, were tried. In 1937, Bartel was appointed Senator of Poland by the President to replace the deceased Emil Bobrowski, and served until the outbreak of World War II. In the autumn of 1938, he was one of the signatories of a document addressed to President Mościcki, which called for the inclusion of representatives of the opposition to the government in connection with the threat of the country's independence. The document also postulated amnesty for politicians of the opposition, who were forced into exile or were imprisoned after the Brest trials. Bartel handed over a memorandum to Mościcki, however, Mościcki did not respond to the proposals. In February 1939 Bartel delivered a speech in the Senate, which has gained wide publicity in the country. In it, he sharply criticized the situation in universities and colleges around Poland; mentioned the widespread anti-Semitism there; and the failed organization of studies, subjects and courses.

== World War II ==
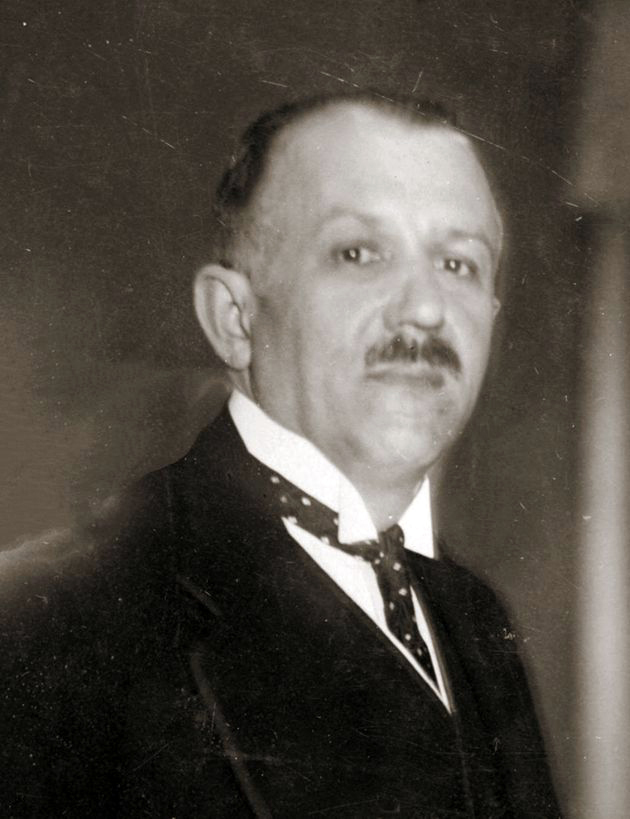
Bartel, 1928

In September 1939, during the defence of Lwów just before the attack of the German troops, Bartel served as the head of the Civic Committee. When Lwów became occupied by the Soviet Union, he was allowed to continue his lectures at the Technical University. In July 1940 he was, along with several other politicians and professors, summoned to Moscow, where he took part in an All-Committee meeting of Universities of the Soviet Union. Conversations and topics mentioned mostly related scientific issues, and Bartel signed a contract with a publishing house to write a textbook of Science and Geometry for the schools of the Soviet Union. He also visited the scientific and cultural institutions like the Tretyakov Gallery and the Institute of Architecture in Moscow. There are some conflicting reports about whether during his stay in Moscow, the Soviets offered him political cooperation. According to some of his closest friends, Stalin issued a proposal for the creation of a new Polish government, but Bartel rejected it. As he wrote to his wife on 16 July 1941: "By listening to private conversations of the officers, I conclude that my position as Prime Minister may be resurrected, but what great duty this will be to control a split, communist country. In Moscow with Joseph Stalin, I had the pleasure of finding out new information from the West - Winston Churchill's speech addressed to Władysław Sikorski about Poland's supposed future."

One of the editions of "Paris' Historical Notebooks" described the content of the letter sent to the German Ministry of Foreign Affairs. It stated that Müller, the Deputy Head of the Security Police and Security Service (Reinhard Heydrich) believed that Bartel negotiated in early 1941 with the Soviet authorities about the establishment of a new nation that together with the Soviet Union was to declare war on Nazi Germany. Similar information can be found, among others, in a telegram sent by the Polish Chargé d'Affaires in Switzerland to the Ministry of Foreign Affairs in London dating from 26 September 1940: "It's believed that Moscow professor Bartel has intention to create the Red Government of Poland." This information, however, was never proved to be true. Meanwhile, Maria Bartlowa, the wife of former prime minister, stated that her husband was talking only with the Soviets on the release of his new lecture book. It is also widely believed that Kazimierz Bartel never met Stalin in person.

The Prime Minister-in-exile stationing in London, General Władysław Sikorski, had plans to co-operate with Bartel and appoint him an ambassador. Sikorski recognized him as one of the few people from the former political circles who would agree to cooperate on the terms and conditions of the British government. On 19 June 1941 Bartel's candidacy was officially reported by Sikorski during a meeting of the Council of Ministers. The decision was motivated by the political loyalty of the former prime minister, as well as his successful efforts to preserve the Polish character of the Lwów Polytechnic under Soviet occupation. Sikorski, however, failed to find Bartel in the Soviet Union, and Stanisław Kot was appointed ambassador instead.

=== Arrest and death ===
On 30 June 1941, soon after the German invasion of the Soviet Union began, the Wehrmacht entered Lwów. Bartel was arrested on 2 July at a meeting with co-workers at the university. Thirty-six other colleagues in the faculty were arrested the next night. Bartel was taken initially to a Gestapo prison on Pelczyńska Street. There, as mentioned by inmate Antoni Stefanowicz, he was treated properly. The former prime minister was allowed to receive, send letters, and mathematical books and papers to his wife, and bring food from home. At the time, Bartel was not questioned, because there were some issues regarding the accusations made by the Gestapo. On 21 July, however, he was transferred to a prison at Łąckiego Street, where he was treated poorly. The guards called him a Commie-Jew, as reported by Stefanowicz, and the Nazi officials ordered Bartel to clean the boots of a Ukrainian Hilfsgestapo soldier. Stefanowicz reported that Bartel was mentally devastated and could not understand the essence of the tragedy.

According to some sources, the Nazi officials proposed the establishment of a Polish puppet government dependent on the Reich. Such information was given by Sikorski during a press conference in Cairo in November 1941 (on the way to Moscow). According to his version, Bartel refused and on the orders of Heinrich Himmler was executed on the 26 July 1941 at dawn. He was shot probably near Piaski Janowskie in the context of the Massacre of Lwów professors. Being barred from her daily delivery of food to her husband on Saturday, June 26, Bartel's wife learned of his death the following Monday.

According to one account, during the night of October 1943 the Sonderkommando composed of Jewish prisoners unearthed the bodies of the murdered Polish professors that were buried in a mass grave. It was carried out to remove the traces of the murder in connection with the approaching Soviet troops. On 9 October 1943, the corpses were piled. The prisoners were forced to take any personal belongings and clothes, including documents of Bartel and Tadeusz Ostrowski. Later the pile of corpses was set on fire, and in the following days, the Sonderkommando scattered the ashes on the surrounding fields.

In 1966, on the 25th anniversary of the execution of Lwów professors, a plaque with the names of the victims of Nazism was placed on the church of St. Francis of Assisi in Kraków. Next to the memorial there is also a separate epitaph in honour of Bartel.

== After death ==
Knowing the importance that Bartel gave to his work on perspective, his wife saved his manuscript after his death by pleading with the Nazi officials. Bartel's library of books was either shipped to Germany with some pieces of furniture, or burned with his personal papers.

Bartel's second book was supposed to be published first in German by B. G. Teubner, who would provide Ksiaznica-Atlas the negatives for the Polish edition. However, the war delayed the printing and ultimately led to the destruction of all materials. In the 1950s, this second book was reconstructed by Professor F. Otto of the University of Gdansk using the surviving manuscript and the printer's proofs which Teubner had sent for Bartel's approval. It dealt with analyzing pictures geometrically, the artistic reconstruction of geometric structures exhibited in pictures, and tracing art history using the tenets of his theory of perspective. A uniform series was released by Polskie Wydawnictwo Naukowe, the second book in 1958 and the first volume in 1960.

== Honours and awards ==
He was decorated with, among others, the Order of the White Eagle (1932) for outstanding achievements, the French Legion of Honour (class I), the Cross of Valour, the Cross of Independence and the Silver Cross of the Virtuti Militari (1922).

Political offices
Preceded by Wincenty Witos	Prime Minister of Poland; 1926	Succeeded by Józef Piłsudski
Preceded by Józef Piłsudski	Prime Minister of Poland; 1928–1929	Succeeded by Kazimierz Świtalski
Preceded by Kazimierz Świtalski	Prime Minister of Poland; 1929–1930	Succeeded by Walery Sławek
