= Kazimierz Świtalski =

Prime Minister of Poland (1886–1962)

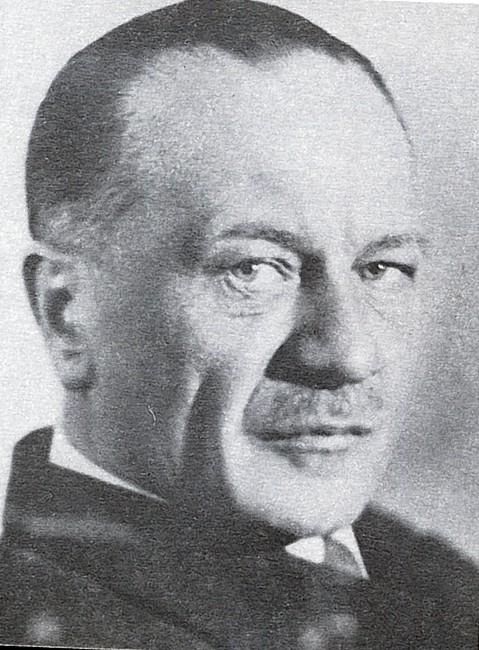

Prime Minister of Poland
- In office 14 April 1929 – 29 December 1929
- President: Ignacy Mościcki
- Preceded by: Kazimierz Bartel
- Succeeded by: Kazimierz Bartel

Marshal of the Sejm
- In office 9 December 1930 – 3 October 1935
- President: Ignacy Mościcki
- Prime Minister: Walery Sławek; Aleksander Prystor; Janusz Jędrzejewicz; Leon Kozłowski; Walery Sławek
- Preceded by: Ignacy Daszyński
- Succeeded by: Stanisław Car

Personal details
- Born: Kazimierz Stanisław Świtalski; 4 March 1886 Sanok, Austro-Hungarian Empire
- Died: 28 December 1962 (aged 76) Warsaw, Poland
- Party: BBWR
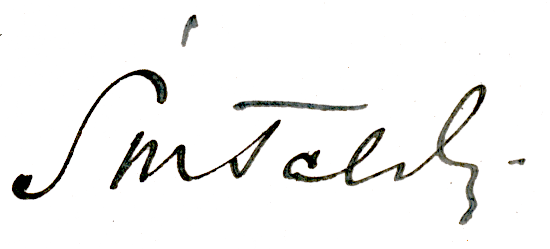
- Signature

Kazimierz Stanisław Świtalski (Polish pronunciation: [kaˈʑimjɛʂ staˈɲiswaf ɕfiˈtalskʲi]; 4 March 1886 – 28 December 1962) was a Polish politician, diplomat, soldier, military officer in the Polish Legions and Prime Minister of Poland between April and December 1929.

== Early life and studies ==
Kazimierz Świtalski was born on 4 March 1886 as the son of Albin Świtalski, governor of Rudki and Sanok, and his second wife Marie Antoinette Veith, whose grandfather, by the order of Emperor Francis I, arrived in Austrian Poland in 1834, together with eight other German families. Between 1897 and 1904 Kazimierz attended the Queen Sofia High School located in Sanok (his classmates included Zdzisław Adamczyk, Witold Fusek, Bolesław Mozołowski and Bronisław Praszałowicz). At that time, the school was led by the Organization called "Radius" (also participating in the organization were brothers Stefan and Włodzimierz Mozołowski and Samuel Herzig). On 21 June 1904 Świtalski received a certificate of maturity with honors and began studying at the Faculty of Philology at the Polish Academy in Lwów. After graduation, he received a doctorate of philosophy in 1910. In the same year he became a professor at a local high school called "gymnasium".

== Polish Legions ==
Even in his youth Świtalski belonged to an organization of socialist independence parties called "Flame" and "Life". Along with Stanisław Kot he directed the work of the Representative Commission of Progressive Youth. In 1910 Świtalski joined the Związek Walki Czynnej (ZWC), an underground organisation formed by future Marshal of Poland and chief-of-state Józef Piłsudski and since October 1912 he was a member of the Rifle Association. In ZWC for the first time he met with Józef Piłsudski. Shortly before the outbreak of World War I, he was an adjutant for Marian Kukiel at the Headquarters of the Rifle Associations in Eastern Galicia and Lwów. From 24 August until 27 October 1914 he was a soldier in the Polish Legions. On 4 November 1914, he was appointed to the rank of lieutenant. Since February 1915 he served as a military office clerk in the Military Department.

From 5 January 1916 he was the head of the office of the Legion Brigade Headquarters. He held this position until the Oath crisis. On 9 July 1917, he was arrested, and four days later dismissed from service in the Legions. As a result, he went to Lwów, where on 1 September, he joined the Polish Military Organization. During the Polish–Ukrainian War he became a member of the Polish National Committee, which played a major role in the conflict. Then he managed to escape from the besieged city with an aircraft. He went to a nearby city called Przemyśl, and later to Kraków, where he sought help for Lwów. By mid December 1918 he took part in the work of the Polish Liquidation Committee and the Interim Governing Committee.

== Political and diplomatic career ==
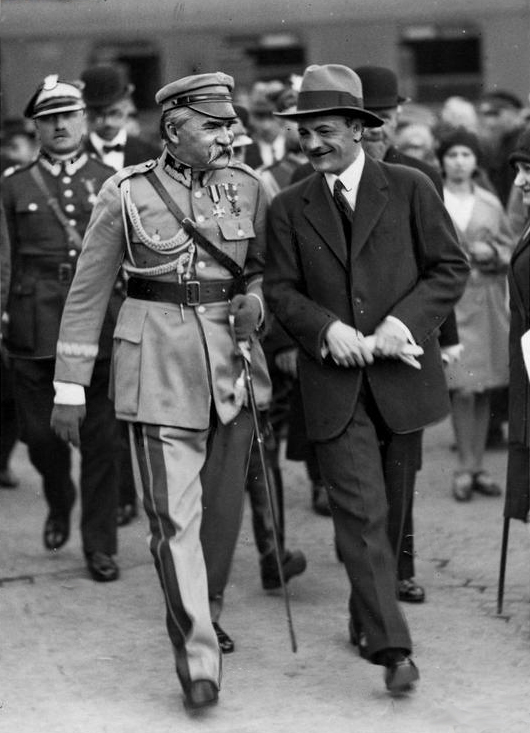
Świtalski with Józef Piłsudski

During the 1926 May Coup d'état in Poland, Świtalski supported Marshal Piłsudski, rather than President Stanisław Wojciechowski. Following the Coup, he was given several political posts. In the same year he appointed the Head of the Civil Chancellery of the President and between 1926 and 1928 he was the director of the Political Department of the Ministry of the Interior. In June 1928 Świtalski became Minister of Education and from April to December 1929 he served as Prime Minister of Poland in competition with Kazimierz Bartel. In 1930 he was elected to the Sejm and between 1933 and 1935 he was its Marshal. He was appointed by the President to the Senate in 1935, where he was also Vice-Marshal. In parallel, he was also the Voivode of Kraków from December 1935 until April 1936.

After the Polish Defensive War of 1939 Kazimierz Świtalski was taken prisoner of war and taken to Woldenberg camp, where he spent the entirety of World War II. His only child, Jacek Świtalski, was killed on the first day of the Warsaw Uprising. In 1945 he returned to Poland and was imprisoned by the communist authorities from 1948 to 1956. He died in Warsaw in 1962, following injuries in a tram accident.

== Honours and awards ==
Kazimierz Świtalski was awarded the Silver Cross of the Order of Virtuti Militari, the Order of Polonia Restituta Classes I and IV, Cross of Independence, the War Memorial Medal 1918 – 1921 and the Decade of Independence Medal, as well as the Estonian Order of the Cross of the Eagle Class I (1934).

== See also ==
- Sanation

Political offices
Preceded by Kazimierz Bartel	Prime Minister of Poland; 1929	Succeeded by Kazimierz Bartel
