= Aleksander Prystor =

Prime Minister of Poland

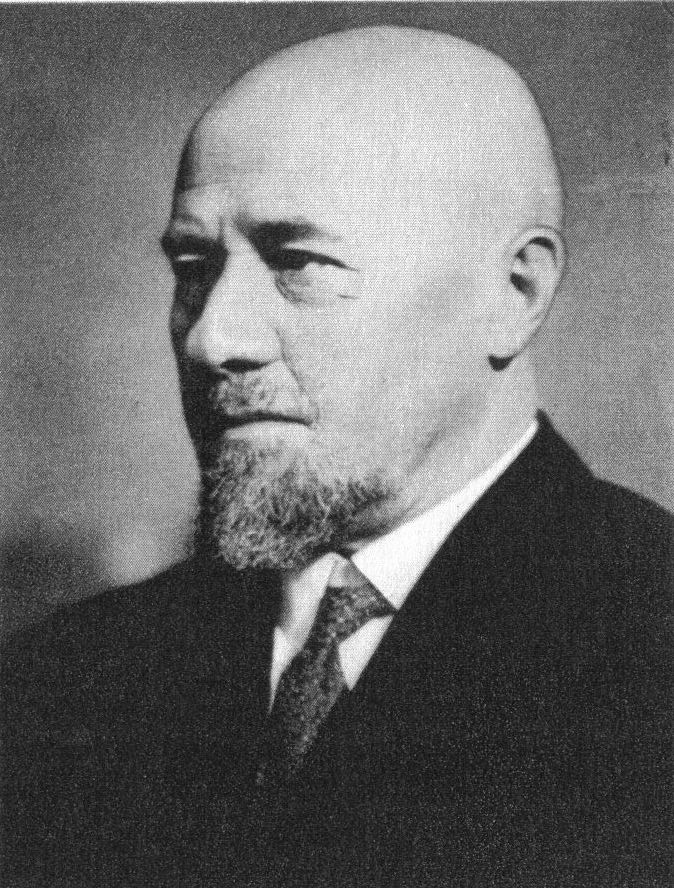
- Aleksander Prystor

23rd Prime Minister of Poland
- In office 27 May 1931 – 9 May 1933
- President: Ignacy Mościcki
- Preceded by: Walery Sławek
- Succeeded by: Janusz Jędrzejewicz

4th Marshal of the Senate
- In office 4 October 1935 – 17 November 1938
- President: Ignacy Mościcki
- Prime Minister: Walery Sławek; Marian Zyndram-Kościałkowski; Felicjan Sławoj Składkowski
- Preceded by: Władysław Raczkiewicz
- Succeeded by: Bogusław Miedziński

Personal details
- Born: Aleksander Błażej Prystor; January 2, 1874 Vilna, Russian Empire (now Vilnius, Lithuania)
- Died: 1941 (aged 66–67) Moscow, Soviet Union
- Cause of death: Dysentery
- Resting place: Powązki Cemetery (symbolic)
- Party: Polish Socialist Party
- Spouse: Janina Prystorowa (m. 1906)
- Education: Imperial Moscow University
- Occupation: Politician; activist; soldier

Aleksander Błażej Prystor (Polish: [alɛˈksandɛr ˈprɨstɔr]; 2 January 1874 – 1941) was a Polish politician, activist, soldier and freemason, who served as 23rd Prime Minister of Poland from 1931 to 1933. He was a member of the Combat Organization of the Polish Socialist Party and in 1908 took part in the Bezdany raid. Between 1912 and 1917 he spent in Russian prisons before being released in 1917. In March 1917 he joined Polish Military Organisation. After independence, he became secretary in the Ministry of Labour and Social Welfare. He fought as a volunteer in the Polish–Soviet War of 1919–1920. He worked for a few ministries (Labour, Industry and Commerce). Between 1931 and 1933 he served as Prime Minister of Poland. After that, he became the Marshal of the Polish Senate 1935–1938.

After the Soviet invasion of Poland in 1939, he fled to neutral Lithuania. After Lithuania was annexed by the USSR he was arrested in June 1940 by the NKVD; he died probably in 1941 (the date is not known) in the prison hospital of the Butyrka prison in Moscow.

== Early life ==
Aleksander Prystor was born in Vilnius, now the capital of Lithuania and then called Vilna under the Russian Empire, to a railroad worker Feliks Prystor and Maria (née Olejnik). In 1894 he graduated from the Second High School in Vilna and began studying mathematics and physics at Imperial Moscow University. Lacking financial support from his family, Prystor lived in poverty. After graduation in 1900, he decided to study medicine at the University of Tartu. In the summer of 1902, he returned to Vilna, taking a job in a bank. Between November 1903 and September 1904, Prystor served in the 16th Sapper Battalion of the Imperial Russian Army.

Sometime in the early 20th century, Prystor joined Polish Socialist Party, and became a close associate of Józef Piłsudski. In September 1903, he left Vilna, and went to Switzerland, to undergo military training, together with Piłsudski and other activists. In 1904 Prystor, together with Jozef Kwiatek, Walery Sławek and Boleslaw Jedrzejowski, organized public protests against the forcible draft of ethnic Poles into the Russian Army to fight in the Russo-Japanese War. Also, he constructed bombs which damaged the monument of Tsar Alexander III of Russia.

In early 1905, Prystor became one of the leaders of the Combat Organization of the Polish Socialist Party. Using the pseudonym Katajama, he organized groups of activists in Warsaw, and in March of that year, he carried out the assassination of Russian Police Officer Karl Nolken. Later on, he participated in a number of raids of the Combat Organization, including bank robberies, terrorist attacks on soldiers and police officers and acts of sabotage. After the split in the party, he joined Polish Socialist Party – Revolutionary Faction, and in 1906 left Congress Poland for Kraków, located at that time in Austrian Galicia. On June 18, 1906, Prystor married Janina Bakun, a fellow member of the Combat Organization.

On September 26, 1908, Prystor was one of the participants of the legendary Bezdany raid. At the same time, he was actively involved in the activities of the Union of Active Struggle. On March 28, 1912, in Warsaw, Prystor was arrested by the Okhrana. After two years of imprisonment in Warsaw Citadel, he was in 1914 sentenced to 7 years of exile, and sent to prison in Oryol. Released after the February Revolution (March 17, 1917), he continued working for the Polish Socialist Party.

After the capture of Minsk by the Imperial German Army (May 1918), Prystor came to Warsaw, to join Polish Military Organisation. Together with other activists, he prepared the assassination of General Hans Hartwig von Beseler, but the attack was cancelled. On November 10, 1918, Prystor was among the officials who welcomed Józef Piłsudski at Warszawa Główna railway station.

Prystor was the godfather of Piłsudski's first daughter, Wanda, born on 7 February 1918.

== Second Polish Republic ==
From 1918 to 1919, Prystor worked in the Ministry of Labour and Social Policy. In April 1919, he was the aide of General Lucjan Zeligowski and participated in the Vilna offensive.

In June 1920, he volunteered for the army, to fight in the Polish–Soviet War. In July he was named company leader in the 201st Infantry Regiment of the Volunteer Division, commanded by Adam Koc (see Volunteer Army (Poland)). Prystor distinguished himself during the fighting, and was awarded the Cross of Valour. Before the Battle of Warsaw (1920), he was recalled from the frontline by Józef Piłsudski and became the personal assistant of the Polish Marshal.

Prystor remained in the Polish Army until 1925. Promoted to major, he was transferred to head the local office of Wojskowa Komenda Uzupelnien (Army Recruiting Office) in Wilno, and together with his family, settled in the real estate at the village of Borki near Wilno (May 1925). Even though he remained a close associate of Piłsudski, he did not come to Warsaw for the 1926 May Coup, remaining in Wilno, together with Edward Śmigły-Rydz. After the coup, Prystor was moved by Piłsudski to the office of the Minister of Military Affairs, and for the next three years, he followed Piłsudski, attending all meetings and military councils, including those marked as top secret.

On April 30, 1927, he was promoted to lieutenant colonel (Podpolkovnik), and began working at the Main Office of the General Inspector of the Armed Forces, where he was responsible for the removal of those officers who opposed the Sanacja regime.

Prystor was one of the few men in Poland with direct access to Piłsudski, at any time of the day and night. He lived in the Belweder, together with the Marshal. In 1929, he was briefly manager of the Personal Officer of the Ministry of Military Affairs. On April 26, 1929, he was named the Minister of Labour and Social Services in the government of Kazimierz Bartel. Working under very difficult conditions, as Poland was affected by the Great Depression, Prystor managed to increase unemployment benefits and increase the program of Public works. Furthermore, he dissolved the structures of the government health insurance program, which were in the hands of oppositional Polish Socialist Party. Among others, Prystor introduced government commissars into local offices of health insurance.

After the collapse of the government of Kazimierz Świtalski, Prystor once again became the Minister of Labour and Social Services, in the fifth government of Kazimierz Bartel. He remained in this post in the governments of Walery Sławek and Józef Piłsudski. In 1931, he was elected to the Sejm, as a member of the pro-government Nonpartisan Bloc for Cooperation with the Government (BBWR), remaining in the Polish Parliament until 1935.

In December 1930, Prystor was appointed the Minister of Trade and Industry, and on May 27, 1931, he became the Prime Minister of Poland. He was regarded as a poor premier, avoiding any reforms. His policies resulted in decrease of investment and deepened recession. Prystor remained in his post until May 1933, when Józef Piłsudski demanded his dismissal. The reason for this most likely was a personal conflict between Prystor's wife Janina, and Piłsudski's wife Aleksandra Piłsudska.

In 1934, Prystor went on a private trip to Lithuania, during which he talked with main Lithuanian politicians, including President Antanas Smetona. The talks were unsuccessful.

After the death of Piłsudski in May 1935, he was associated with the group of Walery Sławek. Prystor took part in the works on the 1935 Polish legislative election, after which he became a senator. On October 4, 1935, he was appointed the speaker of the Polish Senate and remained in this post until November 27, 1938, when President Ignacy Mościcki dissolved Polish parliament.

Following the 1938 parliamentary election, he again was elected to the Senate. On March 9, 1939, he gave a speech, harshly criticizing the policies of the government and the Camp of National Unity. Among others, he claimed that a parliament, elected in undemocratic vote, has no moral right to elect a new president in 1940.

== Invasion of Poland and death ==
On September 18, 1939, Prystor fled to neutral Lithuania, where he helped Polish refugees. After the annexation of the Baltic States into the Soviet Union (see Soviet annexation of the Baltic states (1940)), he was arrested by the NKVD (June 1940). Despite his age of 66, Prystor was taken to the infamous Lubyanka Building. He was in July 1940 sentenced to death, and in July 1941, his sentence was changed to 10 years in prison. Soon afterwards he fell ill with dysentery, and died in a hospital at Butyrka prison. The exact date of his death is unknown. According to former Polish Prime Minister Leon Kozłowski, who was also kept in Lubyanka, Prystor most likely died in August 1941, while Polish historian Władysław Pobóg-Malinowski claims that the death took place in October 1941. His symbolic grave is located at Powązki Cemetery in Warsaw.

== Honours and awards ==
- Silver Cross of the Virtuti Militari
- Grand Cross of the Order of Polonia Restituta, previously awarded the Commander's Cross
- Cross of Independence with Swords
- Cross of Valour
- Grand Cross of the Order of Christ (Portugal, 1931)

Political offices
Preceded by Walery Sławek	Prime Minister of Poland; 1931–1933	Succeeded by Janusz Jędrzejewicz
