= Stanisław Car =

Polish politician (1882–1938)

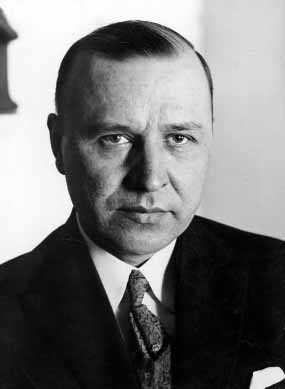
- Stanisław Car

Marshal of the Sejm
- In office 1935–1938

Personal details
- Born: April 26, 1882 Warsaw, Congress Poland
- Died: June 18, 1938 Warsaw, Poland
- Party: Nonpartisan Bloc for Support of Reforms (BBWR)
- Occupation: Politician, lawyer

Stanisław Car (26 April 1882 – 18 June 1938) was a Polish politician, lawyer, Marshal of the Sejm, deputy Prime Minister and the Minister of Justice.

== Life ==
Born on 26 April 1882 into a Warsaw middle-class family, he studied law at the University of Warsaw (until 1905), and then at the University of Odessa, where he graduated in 1907. In 1908–1911, Car worked as a clerk in a court, opening then his own legal office. In 1915, he became a judge, and a member of the Commission of Civil Law of the Provisional Council of State.

For most of the 1920s, Car worked in his office. In 1924, he opened a magazine of Warsaw lawyers, “Palestra”, of which he was the first editor in chief. After the May Coup of 1926, he returned to politics. A close associate of Józef Piłsudski, he remained loyal to the Polish Marshal until Pilsudski's death in May 1935.

Car was a prominent member of the pro-Sanacja party Nonpartisan Bloc for Support of Reforms (BBWR). He co-wrote the April Constitution of Poland.

Stanislaw Car died in Warsaw on 18 June 1938.

== Awards ==
- Order of the White Eagle, posthumously on June 20, 1938,
- Great Ribbon of the Order of Polonia Restituta, 1935,
- Commander's Cross of the Order of Polonia Restituta (May 2, 1922),
- Officer Cross of the Legion of Honour (France).
