= Adam Skwarczyński =

Polish politician

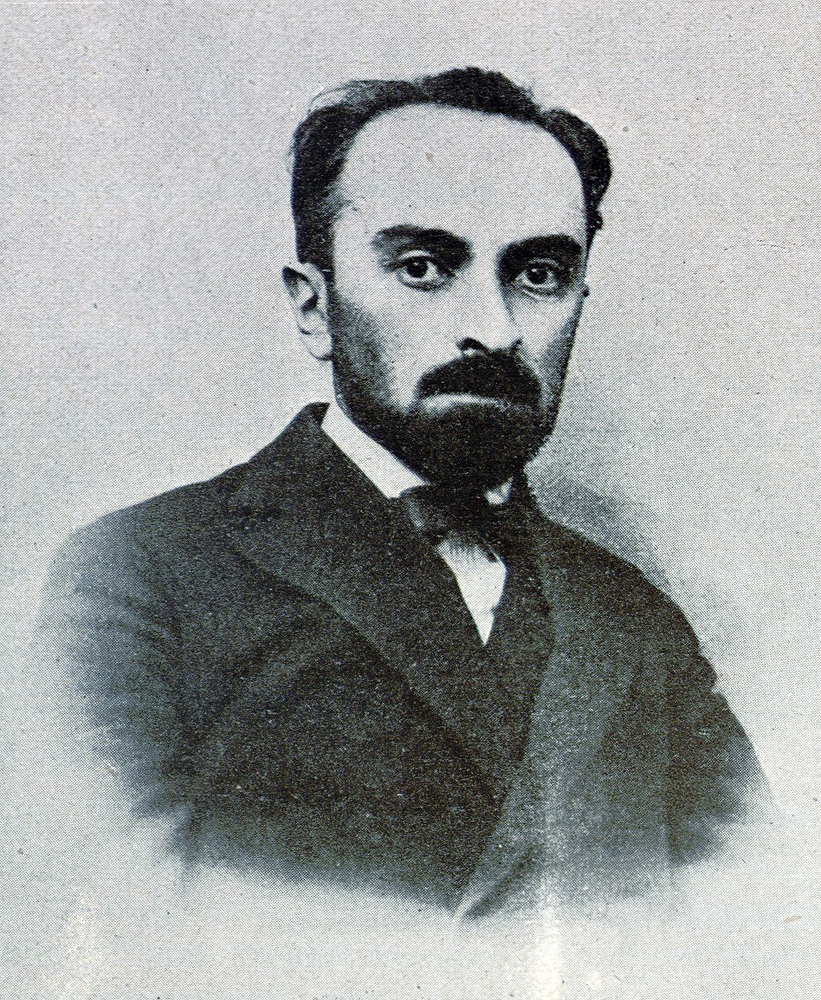
Adam Skwarczyński

Adam Franciszek Ksawery Skwarczynski (Stary, Adam Śliwiński, Adam Płomieńczyk, 1886–1934) was a Polish independence activist and politician, one of main ideologists of the Sanacja movement. A supporter of Józef Piłsudski and his policies, Skwarczynski also was a Freemason and a publicist.

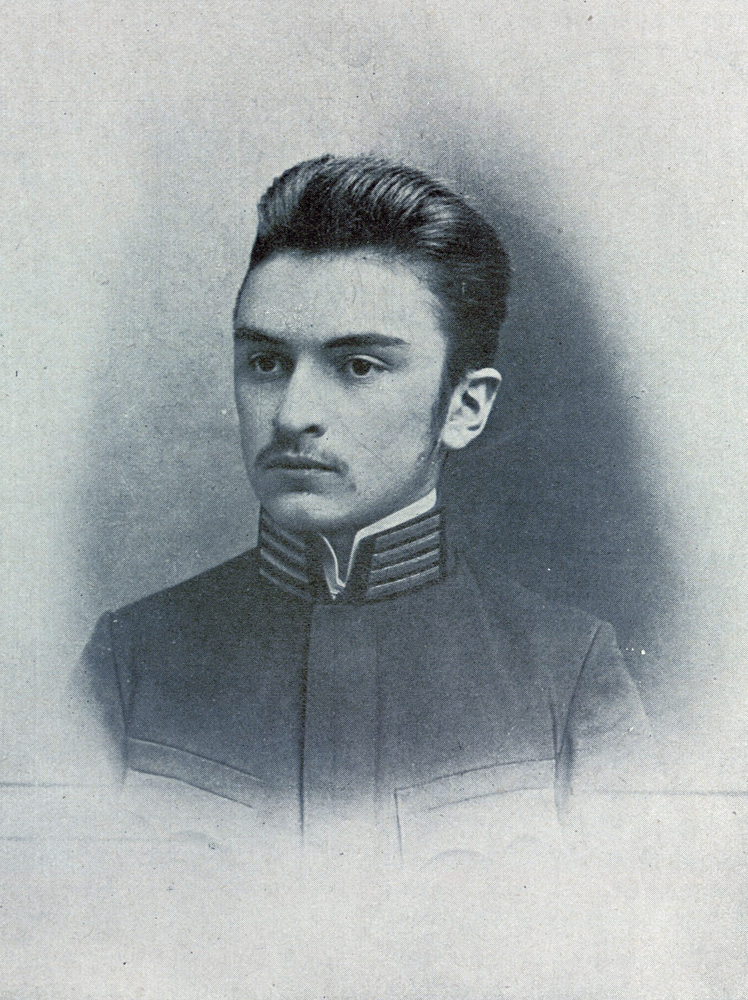
Skwarczyński as a gymnasium student

Skwarczynski was born on 3 December 1886 in the village of Wierzchnia, near Kalusz, Austrian Galicia (today Ukraine). He was raised in a patriotic family: his father Wincenty Skwarczynski fought in the January Uprising, his mother Maria (née Gnoiska) was the daughter of a soldier of the November Uprising. After the death of Wincenty Skwarczynski (1888), whole family moved to Lwów, where Adam, as a teenager, joined Polish independence organizations. A conservative, Skwarczynski was influenced by left-wing writers, such as Edward Abramowski. While in Lwów, he met Józef Piłsudski.

After graduation from high school Skwarczynski began studies at Lwów University, as he planned to be a teacher of the Polish language. In the late 1900s, he completed officer course at a military college of the Union of Active Struggle (ZWC). He joined the ZWC and was a lecturer in the college. In 1910, he joined the Riflemen's Association, at the same time becoming a teacher at Rohatyn. Skwarczynski also published his articles in several local newspapers and magazines. Before the outbreak of World War I, he returned to Lwów.

In the summer of 1914, he joined 1st Brigade, Polish Legions. As a staff officer, he fought in the area of Kielce, and was later transferred to intelligence department of the Polish Legions in World War I. In May 1915, Józef Piłsudski sent him to former Russian Poland, to look for volunteers, willing to join the Legions. Skwarczynski then joined Polish Military Organisation, and settled in Warsaw. Arrested by the Germans, he was sent to Modlin Fortress, to be released on November 12, 1918.

In early 1919, Skwarczynski began working for Gazeta Polska daily, becoming its editor in chief. He also worked for other publications, such as “Government and Nation” and “Nation”, and wrote a brochure “The purpose of the war in the East”, in which he stated that Poland has a peaceful mission to fulfill in Ukraine and Lithuania.

In the early 1920s, he married Anna (née Pradzynska), and together with Adam Koc, Janusz Jędrzejewicz and Tadeusz Hołówko founded the “Road” (“Droga”) monthly magazine. In 1925, he issued a pamphlet, in which he harshly criticized General Władysław Sikorski, who was regarded as one of main opponents of Józef Piłsudski. During the 1926 May Coup, Skwarczynski supported Piłsudski. At that time, he wrote several press articles about moral revolution (see Sanation), which should be introduced in Poland.

After the coup, Skwarczynski was employed in the chancellery of the President of Poland. In 1929, due to a Tuberculosis infection, both his legs were amputated. Nevertheless, he remained a very active person, organizing anti-Endecja youth organizations, and supporting the creation of Central Committee of the Country Youth and Association of Country Colleges.

Adam Skwarczynski died on 2 April 1934 in Warsaw, and was buried at Powązki Cemetery. In Communist Poland, all his publications were banned.

== See also ==
- Nonpartisan Bloc for Cooperation with the Government
- Sanation
- Piłsudski's colonels

== Sources ==
- Jacek Czajowski, Jacek M. Majchrowski: Sylwetki polityków drugiej Rzeczypospolitej. Kraków: Wydawnictwo ZNAK, 1987
