= Northern Front =

Northern Front may refer to the following:

- Russian Northern Front (World War I), a unit of the Imperial Russian army during World War I
- Northern Front (RSFSR), a unit of the Red Army during the Russian civil War (1918-1922)
- Polish Northern Front (1920), a unit of the Polish Army during the Polish–Bolshevik War
- Polish Northern Front (1939), a unit of the Polish Army during the World War II
- Northern Front (Soviet Union), a unit of the Soviet Army during World War II.
