= Gazeta Polska (disambiguation) =

Gazeta Polska is a Polish weekly periodical, founded in 1993.

Gazeta Polska may also refer to:

- Gazeta Polska (1826–1907), defunct Polish newspaper
- Gazeta Polska (1929-1939), an interwar newspaper in the Second Polish Republic
- Gazeta Polska Codziennie, a Polish daily, founded in 2011
