= Second Sikorski cabinet =

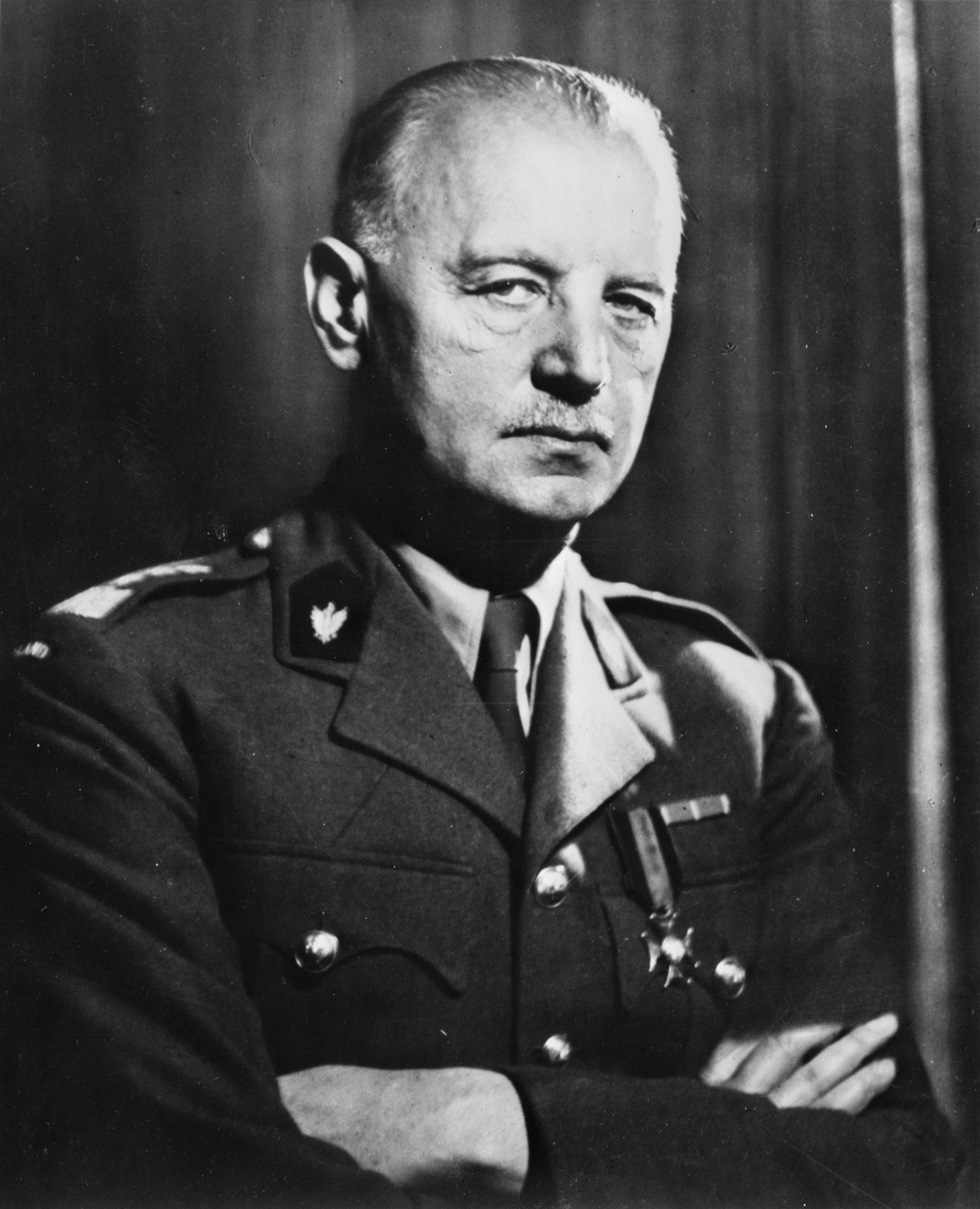
Władysław Sikorski

Second Cabinet of Władysław Sikorski (Polish: Drugi rząd Władysława Sikorskiego) was the first cabinet of the Polish Government in Exile, formed after Nazi Germany invasion and seize of Poland in September–October 1939, headed by General and former Prime Minister (1922-1923). The appointed was first President in exile Władysław Raczkiewicz

Cabinet, formed on 30 September 1939 and dismissed on 18 July 1940, was preceded by the last the Government resided in country (under Felicjan Sławoj Składkowski) and was succeeded by third Sikorski cabinet.

- Gen. Władysław Sikorski - Prime Minister, Minister of Military Affairs and Minister of Internal Affairs
- Stanisław Stroński (SN) - Deputy Prime Minister (until December 1939), Minister of Information
- Col. Adam Koc - Minister of the Treasury, Minister of Industry and Commerce
- August Zaleski - Minister of Foreign Affairs
- Aleksander Ładoś (SL) - Minister without Portfolio (until December 1939)
- Adam Romer - Head of Presidium of the Council of Ministers

Changes:

- Jan Stańczyk (PPS) - Minister of Social Services (from 2 October 1939)
- Józef Haller (SP) - Minister without Portfolio (from 3 October 1939)
- Gen. Władysław Sikorski - Minister of Justice (from 16 October 1939)
- Gen. Kazimierz Sosnkowski - Minister without Portfolio (from 16 October 1939)
- Marian Seyda (SN) - Minister without Portfolio (from 16 October 1939)
- Stanisław Kot (SL) - Minister without Portfolio (from 7 December 1939)
- Henryk Leon Strasburger - Minister of Industry and Commerce (from 9 December 1939)
