= Camp of National Unity =

Camp of National Unity Obóz Zjednoczenia Narodowego
- Abbreviation: OZN
- Leader: Adam Koc; Stanisław Skwarczyński; Zygmunt Wenda
- Founded: 21 February 1937
- Dissolved: 16 May 1941
- Preceded by: Sanation
- Headquarters: Warsaw, Poland
- Newspaper: Gazeta Polska
- Youth wing: Union of Young Poland
- Paramilitary wing: Camp of Fighting Poland (1942-1944)
- Membership (1938): 100,000
- Ideology: Polish nationalism National conservatism Economic antisemitism Economic militarism Economic nationalism Anti-communism
- Political position: Right-wing

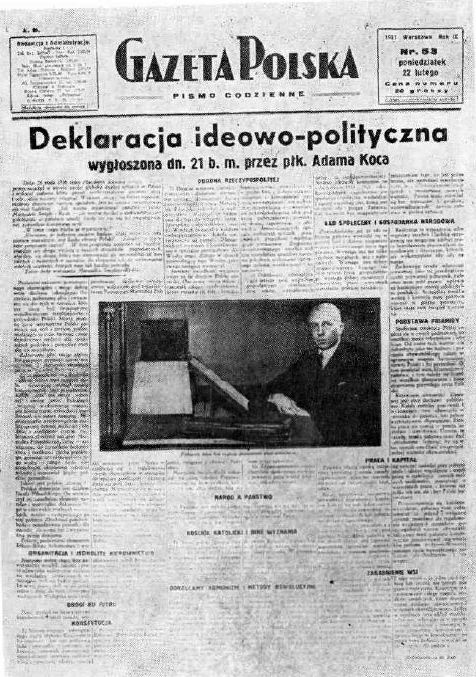
Declaration of OZN political program in Gazeta Polska on 22 February 1937

Obóz Zjednoczenia Narodowego ([ˈɔbuz zjɛdnɔˈtʂɛɲa narɔdɔˈvɛɡɔ], OZN; English: Camp of National Unity), often called Ozon (Polish for "ozone"), was a Polish political party founded in 1937 by sections of the leadership in the Sanation movement.

== History ==
A year after the 1935 death of Poland's Chief of State Marshal Józef Piłsudski, in mid-1936, one of his followers, Marshal Edward Śmigły-Rydz, attempted to unite the various government factions under his leadership. The attempt failed as another (opposing) Sanacja politician, President Ignacy Mościcki, likewise had a large following; nevertheless, substantial numbers of people did throw their lot in with Śmigły-Rydz.

On February 21, 1937, diplomat and Colonel Adam Koc formally announced the formation of OZN. Its stated aims were to improve Poland's national defense and to safeguard the April 1935 Constitution. OZN was strongly pro-military, and its politicians sought to portray Marshal Śmigły-Rydz as Marshal Józef Piłsudski's heir, describing Śmigły-Rydz as the "second person in the country" after President Mościcki—a claim that had no foundation in the Polish Constitution. The party later went on to win the 1938 Legislative election.

The OZN adopted 13 theses on the Jewish question. Modeled after the Nuremberg laws, they labelled Jews as a foreign element that should be deprived of all civil rights and ultimately expelled altogether.

OZN's first official leader was Adam Koc, and its second was General Stanisław Skwarczyński. After the 1939 German invasion of Poland and the start of World War II, OZN leadership passed to Colonel Zygmunt Wenda. In 1937, OZN claimed some 40,000–50,000 members; in 1938, 100,000.

During World War II and the German occupation of Poland, OZN's underground military arm, created in 1942, was known as Obóz Polski Walczącej (the Camp of Fighting Poland).

== See also ==
- Nonpartisan Bloc for Cooperation with the Government (Bezpartyjny Blok Współpracy z Rządem, BBWR)
- National Radical Camp (1934) (Obóz Narodowo-Radykalny, ONR)

== Bibliography ==
- Wynot, Jr., Edward D. (October 1971). "'A Necessary Cruelty': The Emergence of Official Anti-Semitism in Poland, 1936–39". The American Historical Review. 76 (4). The American Historical Review: 1035–58. doi:10.2307/1849240. JSTOR 1849240.
- Seidner, Stanley S. (1975). "The Camp of National Unity: An Experiment in Domestic Consolidation". The Polish Review. 20 (2–3): 231–36.
