= Stanisław Skwarczyński =

Austro-Hungarian soldier (1888–1981)

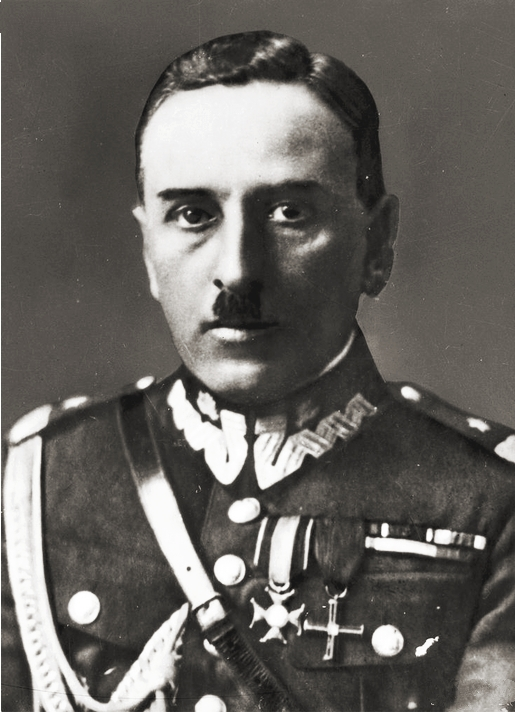
Stanisław Skwarczyński

Stanisław Eugeniusz Skwarczyński (1888–1981) was a soldier of the Austro-Hungarian Army, officer of Polish Legions in World War I, and General brygady of the Polish Army. He fought in several conflicts, including World War I, Polish-Czechoslovak War, Polish-Ukrainian War, Polish-Soviet War and the Invasion of Poland. Furthermore, Skwarczynski was a freemason, member of a Masonic Lodge in Wilno.

== Biography ==
Skwarczyński was born on 17 November 1888 in the village of Wierzchnia, Kalusz County, Austrian Galicia. He studied architecture at Lwów Polytechnic, and was an active member of Polish paramilitary organizations, such as the Union of Active Struggle and the Riflemen's Association. In 1914, he joined Polish Legions in World War I. Appointed to the post of battalion commandant of 1st Legions Infantry Regiment, he was on 15 June 1915 promoted to the rank of Poruchik. After the Oath crisis, Skwarczyński was forced to join Austro-Hungarian Army, from which he deserted. In 1918–1917, he was conspirational commandant of Łódź Area of Polish Military Organisation.

In November 1918, Skwarczyński joined Polish Army, and soon afterwards, he became commandant of 3rd Battalion of 28th Kaniów Rifles Regiment. Together with his unit, he briefly fought against Czechoslovak forces in Cieszyn Silesia, to be transferred to Eastern Galicia, where Polish-Ukrainian conflict took place in late 1918 and 1919.

On 15 April 1920 Skwarczyński was named commandant of 2nd Battalion of 5th Legions Infantry Regiment. During the war with Soviet Union, he commanded 5th Legions Infantry Regiment, remaining in this post until 1926. On 14 February 1929 he was appointed commandant of 3rd Legions Infantry Division, stationed in Zamość. On 25 October 1930 Skwarczyński was appointed to the prestigious post of commandant of elite 1st Legions Infantry Division, stationed in Wilno. On 1 January 1931 Skwarczyński was promoted to Generał brygady. In the late 1930s, he was actively involved in politics, as a supporter of the Sanacja movement. In 1938–39, he was the leader of Camp of National Unity, and in 1938 he officially opened the Sejm (Parliament]) of Poland.

In late August 1939, Skwarczyński returned to active military service, and was appointed commandant of the so-called Intervention Corps (Korpus Interwencyjny), which was sent to the Polish Corridor, with the task to counter a possible German action in the Free City of Danzig. After a short time he was appointed commandant of Operational Group Wyszków, but did not take this post. Instead, he became commandant of rear units of southern group of Prusy Army.

Skwarczynski’s leadership in the Invasion of Poland was a complete failure. His forces were routed by the Wehrmacht in the Battle of Radom, after which he ordered 12th Infantry Division to disperse and abandon its heavy equipment, including 50 cannons. Together with a number of soldiers, he managed to cross the Vistula, and join the units which moved southwards, to the Romanian Bridgehead. Captured by the Germans during the Battle of Tomaszów Lubelski, he was sent to Oflag Dorsten, where he remained until liberation. In April 1945, he went to London, and remained in exile until his death. After the war, Skwarczyński decided to stay away from the political and social life of the Polish community of Great Britain. He died in London on 8 August 1981 and was buried at Elmers End Cemetery.

== Honors and awards ==
- Silver Cross of the Virtuti Militari (1921)
- Commander's Cross, Order of Polonia Restituta,
- Officer’s Cross, Order of Polonia Restituta,
- Cross of Independence,
- Cross of Valour (Poland) (four times),
- Gold Cross of Merit (Poland) (1930),
- commemorative medal “Poland to Her Defender”, for the wars of 1918–1921,
- Medal of Ten Years of Independent Poland,
- Officer Cross of the Legion of Honour.

== Sources ==
- Tadeusz Kryska-Karski i Stanisław Żurakowski, Generałowie Polski Niepodległej, Editions Spotkania, Warszawa 1991
- Piotr Stawecki, Słownik biograficzny generałów Wojska Polskiego 1918–1939, Warszawa 1994
