= Camp of Fighting Poland =

World War II resistance movement

Symbol used by the Camp of Fighting Poland

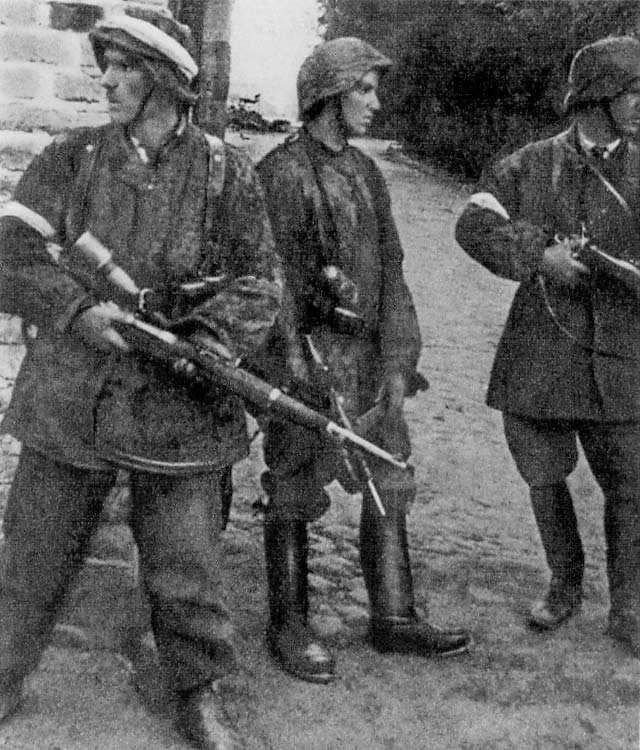
Soldiers of Batalion Zośka of Polish Home Army during Warsaw Uprising on 5 August 1944 in Gęsiówka

Obóz Polski Walczącej (OPW, Camp of Fighting Poland; or Fighting Poland Movement; or Polish Fighting Movement) was a minor part of the Polish resistance movement in World War II. It operated from 1942 to 1944, centered in Warsaw. Its members had mostly belonged to the former political party, Obóz Zjednoczenia Narodowego (Camp of National Unity, or 'Ozon'), part of the Sanacja movement.

Organizers of this movement included Marshal Edward Rydz-Śmigły (who proposed its name) and Julian Piasecki, who became its commandant. It became militarily subordinate to the Armia Krajowa from 1943 and eventually merged along with Konwent Organizacji Niepodległościowych (the Council of Independence Organizations) into Zjednoczenie Organizacji Niepodległościowych (the Union of Independence Organizations) in 1944.
