= Sanation =

Historical Polish political movement

Sanacja
- Members
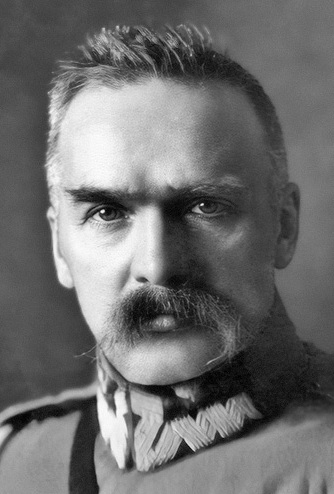
- Józef Piłsudski

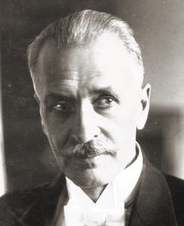
- Ignacy Mościcki

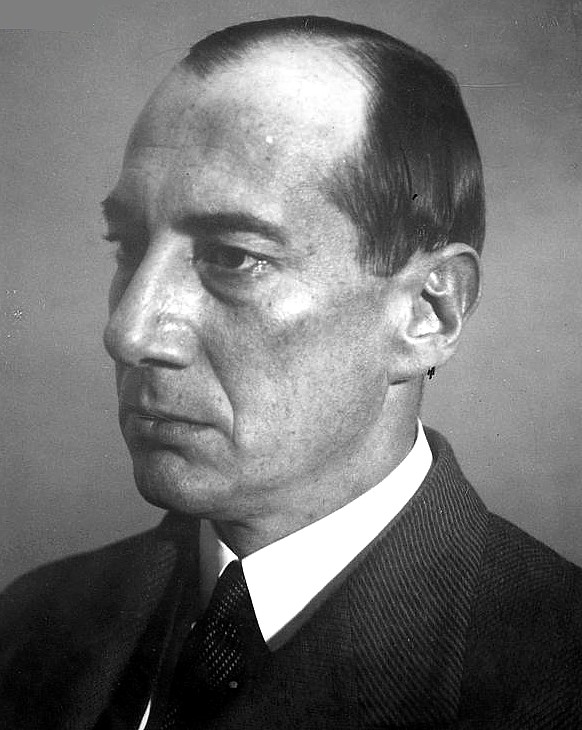
- Józef Beck

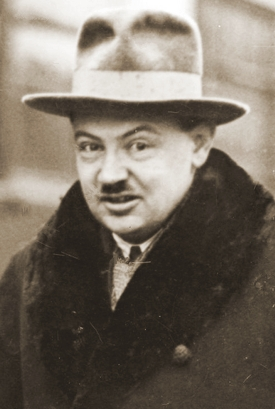
- Tadeusz Hołówko

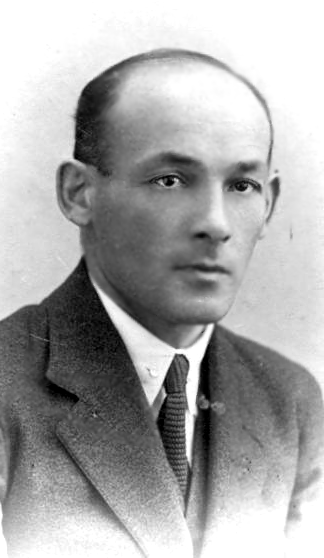
- Janusz Jędrzejewicz

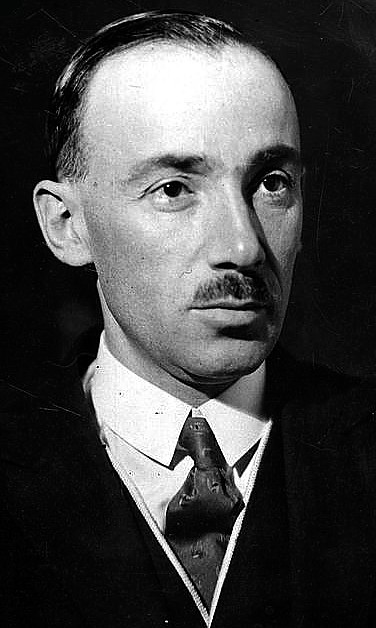
- Wacław Jędrzejewicz

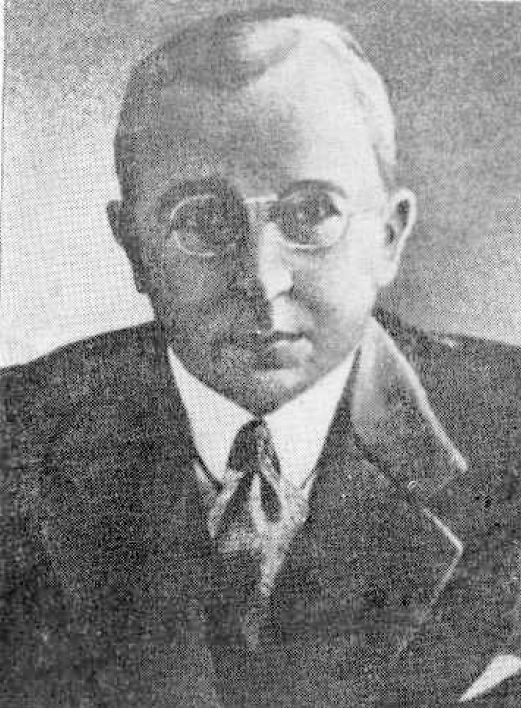
- Adam Koc

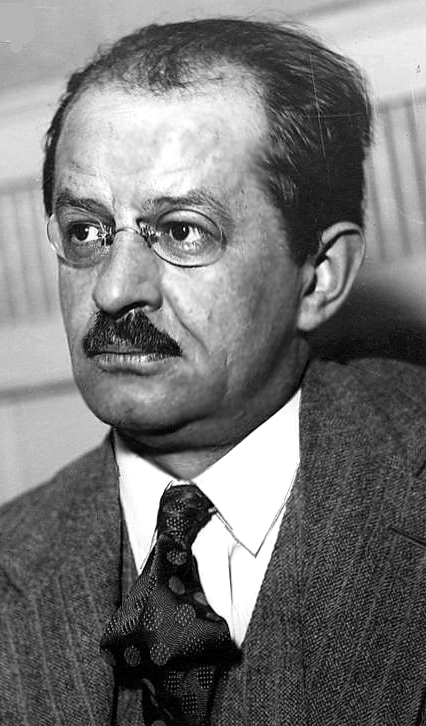
- Leon Kozłowski

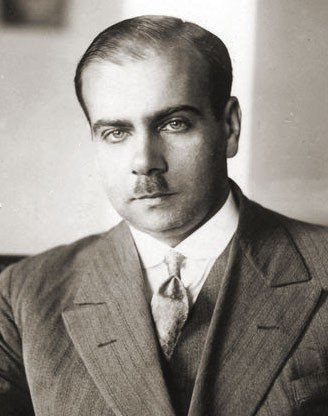
- Ignacy Matuszewski

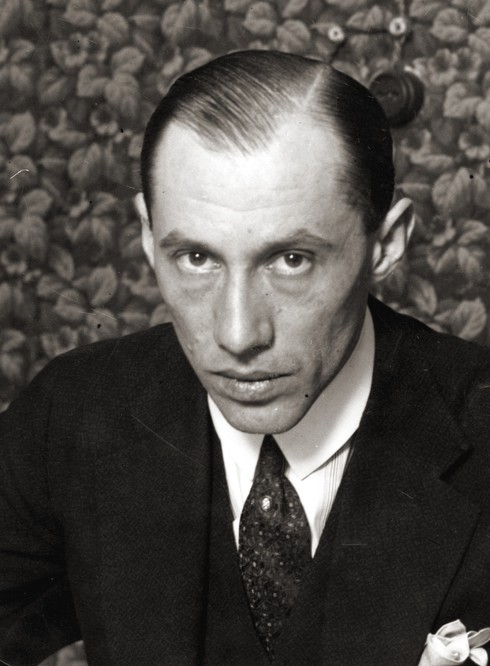
- Bogusław Miedziński (pl)

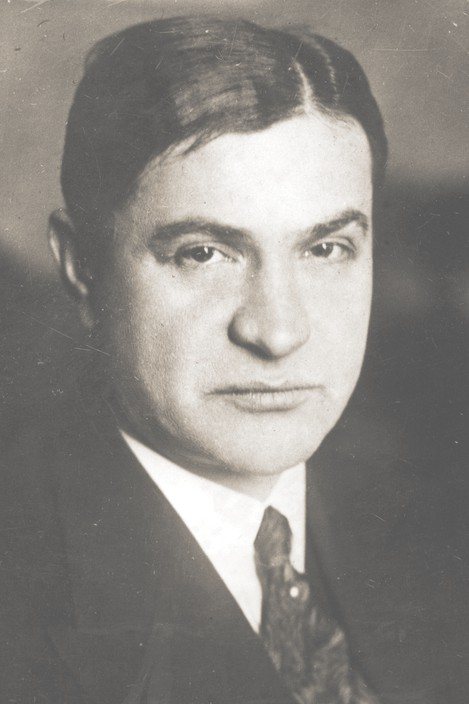
- Bronisław Pieracki

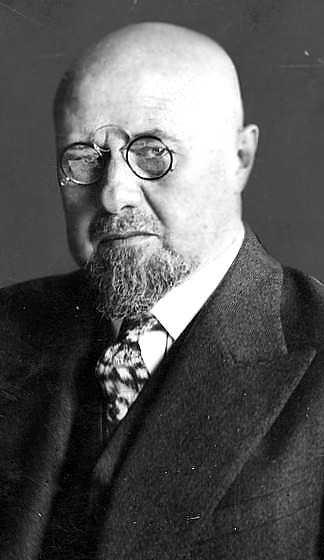
- Aleksander Prystor

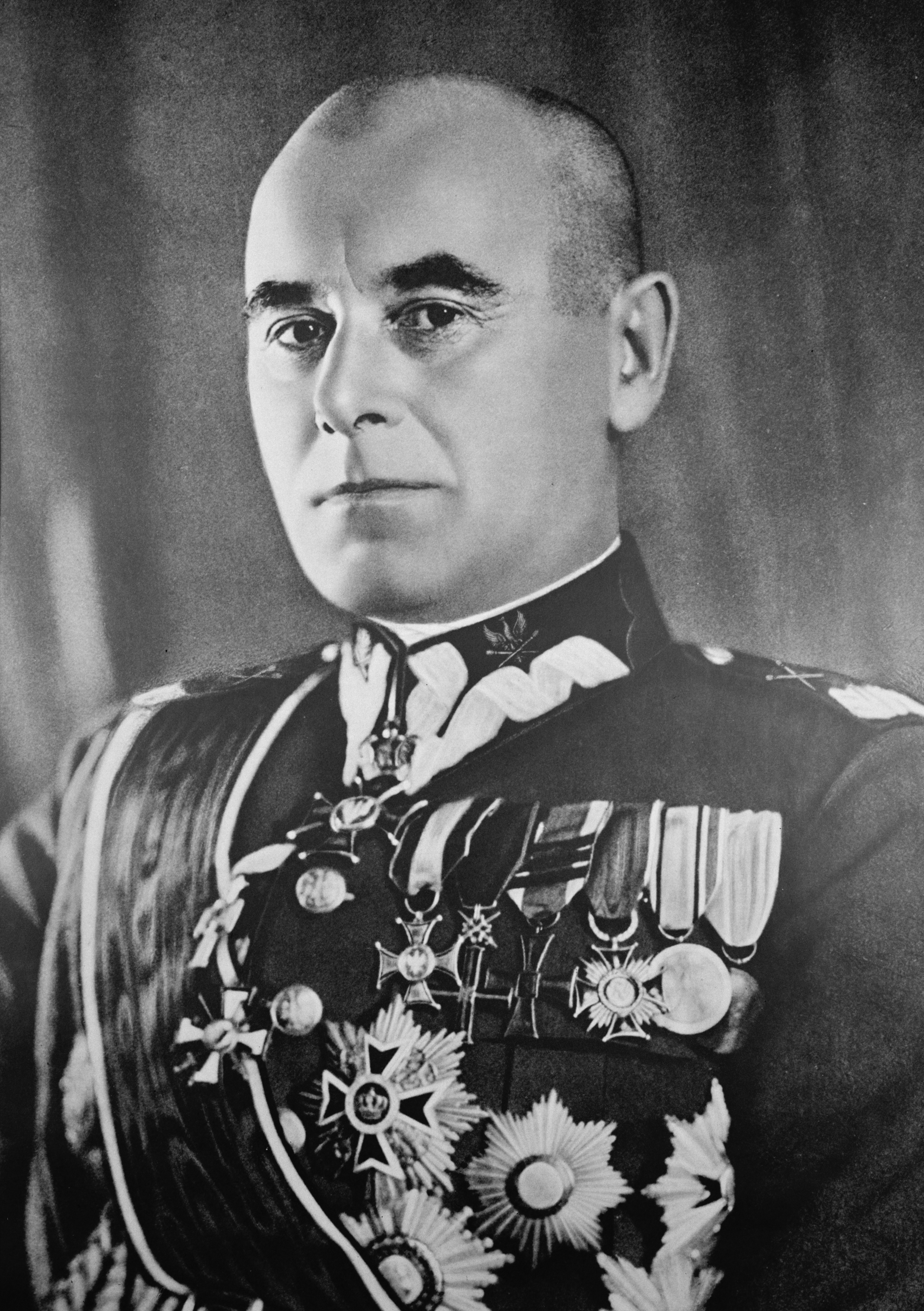
- Edward Śmigły-Rydz

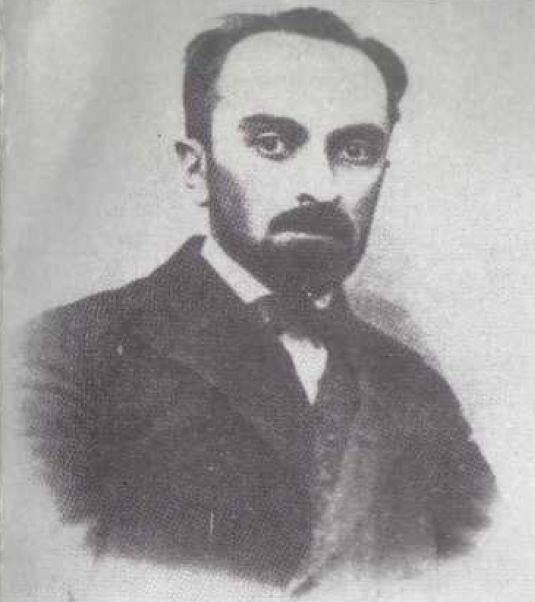
- Adam Skwarczyński

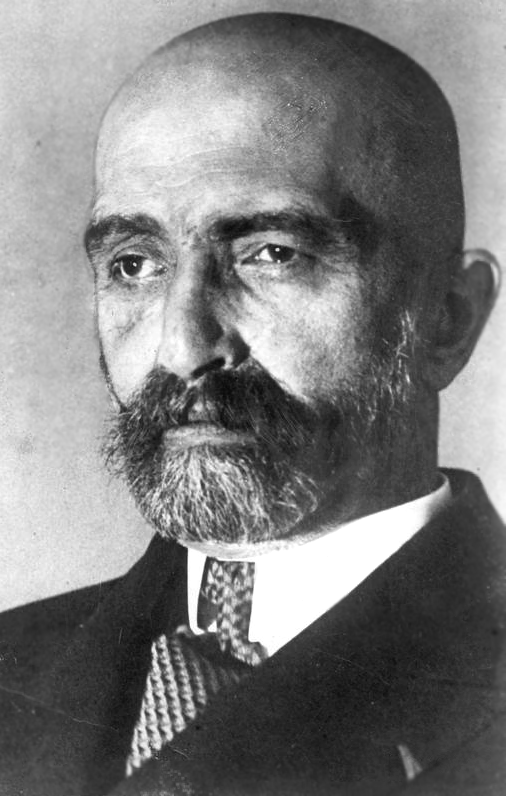
- Walery Sławek

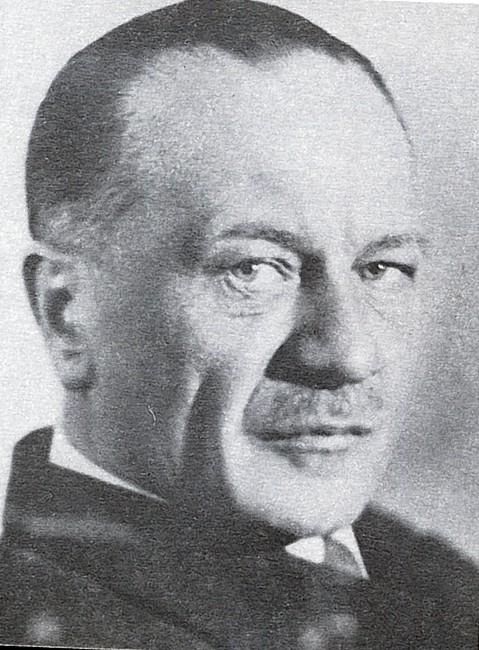
- Kazimierz Świtalski

Sanation (Polish: Sanacja, pronounced [saˈnat͡sja]) was a Polish political movement that emerged in the interwar period, prior to Józef Piłsudski's May 1926 Coup d'État, and gained influence following the coup. In 1928, its political activists went on to form the Nonpartisan Bloc for Cooperation with the Government (BBWR).

The Sanation movement took its name from Piłsudski's goal of a moral "sanation" (healing) of the Polish body politic. The movement functioned cohesively until Piłsudski's death in 1935. Following his death, Sanation fragmented into several factions, including "the Castle" (President Ignacy Mościcki and his supporters).

Sanation, which supported authoritarian rule, was led by a circle of Piłsudski's close associates, including Walery Sławek, Aleksander Prystor, Kazimierz Świtalski, Janusz Jędrzejewicz, Adam Koc, Józef Beck, Tadeusz Hołówko, Bogusław Miedziński, and Edward Śmigły-Rydz. It emphasized the primacy of the national interest in governance, and opposed the system of parliamentary democracy.

== Background ==
Named after the Latin word for "healing" ("sanatio"), the Sanation movement mainly consisted of former military officers who were dissatisfied with the perceived corruption in Polish politics. Sanation was a coalition of rightists, leftists, and centrists, primarily focused on addressing corruption and reducing inflation. The movement emerged prior to the May 1926 Coup d'État and persisted until the onset of World War II, but was never formalized. While Piłsudski had previously led the Polish Socialist Party, he grew disillusioned with political parties, which he viewed as promoting their own interests rather than those of the state and the people. As a result, the Sanation movement did not evolve into a political party. Instead, in 1928, Sanation members formed the Bezpartyjny Blok Współpracy z Rządem (BBWR, "Nonpartisan Bloc for Cooperation with the Government"), a pro-government group that did not consider itself a political party.

== History ==
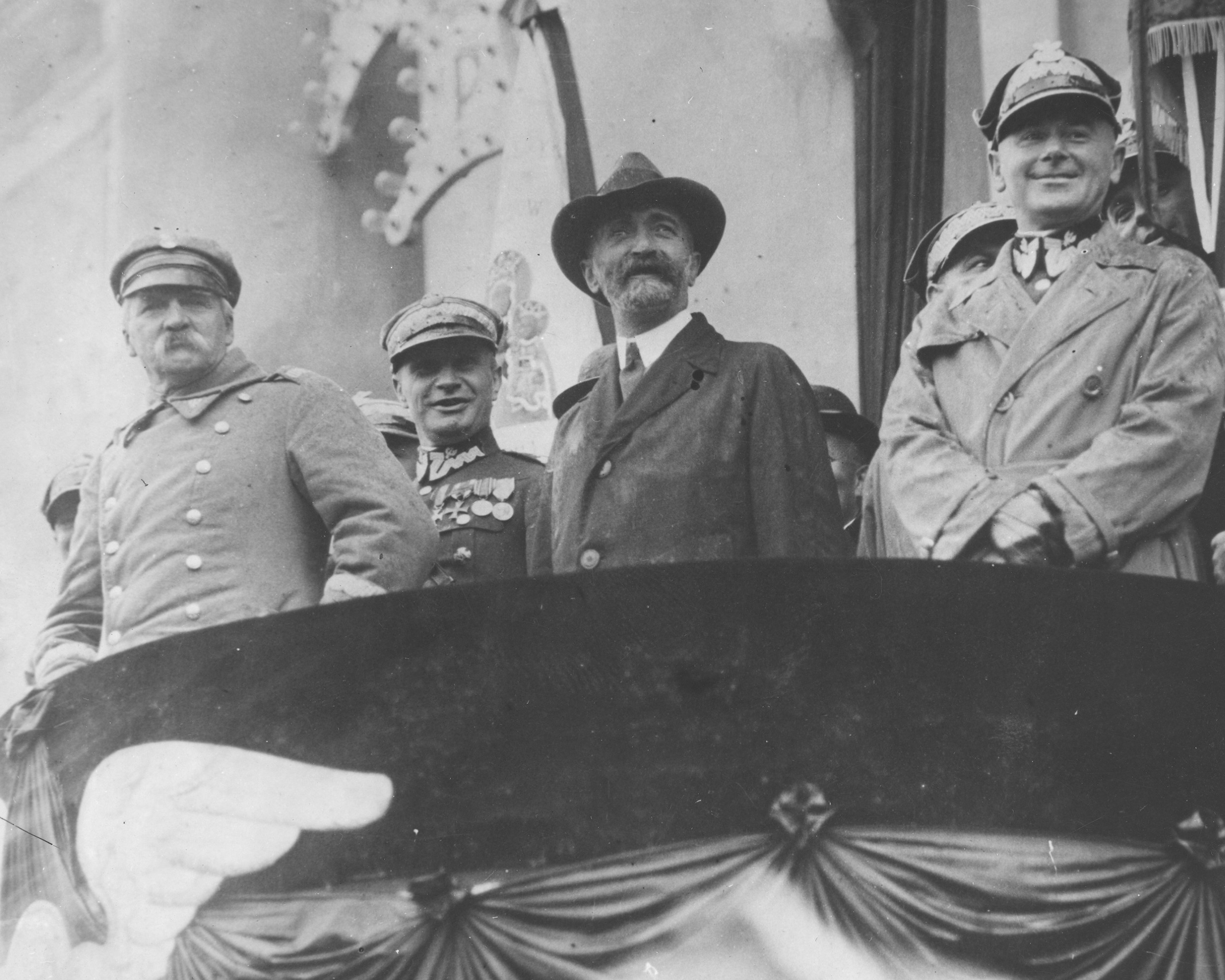
In front, left to right: Józef Piłsudski, Walery Sławek, Edward Śmigły-Rydz, 1930

Although Piłsudski never sought personal power, he exercised considerable influence over Polish politics after Sanation came to power in 1926. For the next decade, he played a central role in Polish affairs as the de facto leader of a generally popular centrist regime. Kazimierz Bartel's government and all subsequent governments were informally approved by Piłsudski before being confirmed by the President. In his pursuit of sanation, Piłsudski combined democratic and authoritarian elements. Poland's internal stability improved, and economic stagnation was addressed through Eugeniusz Kwiatkowski's economic reforms. At the same time, the Sanation regime took action against communist parties (citing formal grounds that they had failed to legally register as political parties) and worked to limit the influence of opposition parties by fragmenting their support. A notable feature of the regime was that, unlike in many non-democratic European countries, it did not evolve into a full dictatorship. Freedom of the press, speech, and political parties was never legally abolished, and opposition figures were often dealt with through means other than formal court sentences, such as actions by "unidentified perpetrators."

Sanation allowed the 1928 election to be relatively free, but faced a setback when its BBWR supporters fell short of securing a majority. Prior to the 1930 election, some opposition parties united in a Centrolew (Center-Left) coalition, calling for the government's overthrow; in response, Sanation arrested more than 20 prominent opposition leaders from the Centrolew movement. In the subsequent election, BBWR won over 46 percent of the vote and secured a large majority in both houses of parliament. The personality cult surrounding Józef Piłsudski was largely a result of his general popularity with the public, rather than through top-down propaganda, which is notable given Piłsudski's skepticism of democracy. Sanation's ideology focused primarily on populist calls for political and economic reform, but did not delve into societal issues in the manner of contemporary fascist regimes. From 1929, the semi-official newspaper of Sanation, and thus of the Polish government, was Gazeta Polska (the Polish Gazette).

== Legislative agenda ==
The Sanation government invalidated the results of the May 1930 election by disbanding the parliament in August. New elections were scheduled for November 1930. In response to anti-government demonstrations, 20 opposition-party members, including most of the leaders of the Centrolew alliance (Socialist, Polish People's Party "Piast", and Polish People's Party "Wyzwolenie" leaders) were arrested in September 1930 without warrants, on the orders of Piłsudski and the Minister of Internal Security, Felicjan Sławoj Składkowski, and accused of plotting an anti-government coup.

The opposition leaders (including former prime minister Wincenty Witos and Wojciech Korfanty) were imprisoned and tried at the Brest Fortress (which led to the popular name for the November 1930 election: "the Brest election"). A number of lesser-known political activists across the country were also arrested; they were released after the election. The Brest trial concluded in January 1932, with ten of the accused sentenced to up to three years' imprisonment; appeals in 1933 upheld the sentences. The government offered those sentenced the option of emigrating abroad; five chose this option, while the other five decided to serve their prison terms.

== Splintering and power-sharing ==
A key turning point for the Piłsudskiites occurred in 1935 with Piłsudski's death. The April 1935 Constitution, adopted a few weeks earlier, had been designed with Marshal Piłsudski in mind. In the absence of a successor with similar authority, a reinterpretation of the new Constitution became necessary. As Ignacy Matuszewski stated, "We must replace the Great Man with an organization."

Piłsudski's death led to the fragmentation of Sanation, driven by two main factors: competition for power and influence among Piłsudski's followers (the struggles among the diadochi – "the heirs" – as Adam Pragier referred to them); and a search for a more suitable ideology that Piłsudski's supporters might accept. The combination of personal competition and differing ideological views resulted in division and a lack of unity.

Eventually, Sanation divided into three major factions:

- "the Colonels" (Pułkownicy, gathered around Walery Sławek), which sought to continue the Piłsudskiite ideology in alignment with the principles of the April Constitution;
- "the Castle" (Zamek, formed around President Ignacy Mościcki, who resided in the Warsaw Castle, which gave the faction its name); and
- GISZ (Generalny Inspektor Sił Zbrojnych), formed around General Inspector of the Armed Forces Marshal Edward Śmigły-Rydz as a representative of the late Marshal Piłsudski.

"In accordance with the will of Mr. President of the Republic Ignacy Mościcki, I order the following: General Śmigły-Rydz, appointed by Mr. Marshal Józef Piłsudski as the First Defender of the Fatherland and the first co-cooperator of the President of the Republic in governing the state, is to be regarded and respected as the first person in Poland after Mr. President of the Republic. All state functionaries headed by the Prime Minister are to show him signs of honor and obedience."

— Prime Minister General Sławoj Składkowski

The document deviated from the state order established by the April Constitution.

Another outcome of the Mościcki-Śmigły agreement was the promotion of the general to Marshal of Poland. On November 10, 1936, President Mościcki appointed him General of the branch and, at the same time, Marshal of Poland, and decorated him with the Order of the White Eagle.

Additionally, the creation of the Camp of National Unity (OZN) under Śmigły’s direction and within his framework expanded his influence. As a result, he became the central figure in determining the ideological direction of Sanation from 1937 to 1939.

Piłsudski's death led to a power struggle, as is often the case in such circumstances. At the same time, there were increasing differences in political thought among the Piłsudskiites. The Colonels' group and Sławek lost influence, and with them, the concepts of a socialized state and the Constitution as the sole regulator of state life. A new authority emerged in the figure of Śmigły-Rydz, largely supported by some former Colonels. This new group, centered around the General Inspector, took a nationalistic direction, and at times exhibited pro-totalitarian tendencies. The Castle Group and the “Naprawa” group, based around the president, sought to moderate these tendencies. The Sanation left, weak among the Piłsudskiites, effectively distanced itself from the camp.

== World War II ==
During the 1939 invasion of Poland, many Sanationists evacuated to Romania or Hungary, from where they were able to travel to France or French-mandated Syria and, after the fall of France, to Britain. Although France sought to exclude Sanationists from the Polish Government in Exile, many continued to maintain influence. During the war, Sanationists established several resistance organizations, including in 1942 the Polish Fighting Movement (Obóz Polski Walczącej), which in 1943 became subordinate to the Home Army and in 1944 merged with the Council of Independence Organizations (Konwent Organizacji Niepodległościowych) to form the Union of Independence Organizations (Zjednoczenie Organizacji Niepodległościowych). After World War II, Poland's Soviet-installed communist government labeled Sanationists as enemies of the state, leading to executions or forced exile for many.

== Political parties ==
The following is a list of Sanation's political parties and their successors:

- 1928–1935: Nonpartisan Bloc for Cooperation with the Government (BBWR)
- 1937–1939: Camp of National Unity (OZN)
- 1979–2003 Confederation of Independent Poland (KPN)
- 1985–1992 Polish Independence Party (PPN)
- 1992–1998 Movement for the Republic – Patriotic Camp (RdR)
- 1993-1997 Nonpartisan Bloc for Support of Reforms (BBWR)

== Notable members ==
- Józef Beck
- Tadeusz Hołówko
- Janusz Jędrzejewicz
- Wacław Jędrzejewicz
- Adam Koc
- Leon Kozłowski
- Ignacy Matuszewski
- Bogusław Miedziński
- Ignacy Mościcki
- Bronisław Pieracki
- Józef Piłsudski
- Aleksander Prystor
- Edward Śmigły-Rydz
- Adam Skwarczyński
- Walery Sławek
- Kazimierz Świtalski

== See also ==
- Intermarium
- Prometheism
- Józef Piłsudski
- History of Kraków
- History of Warsaw
- Piłsudski's colonels
- 1934 flood in Poland
- Bereza Kartuska prison
- Second Polish Republic
- Polish Underground State
- Polish–Romanian alliance
- European interwar dictatorships
