= Henryk Leon Strasburger =

Polish economist (1887–1951)

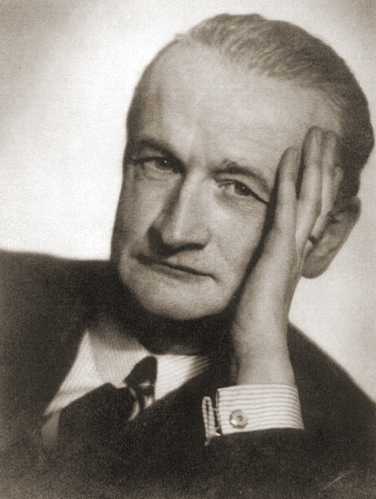

Personal details
- Born: 27 May 1887 Warsaw, Congress Poland, Russian Empire
- Died: 2 May 1951 (aged 63) London, England, United Kingdom
- Spouse: Olga Dunin
- Children: Henry Strasburger, Teresa Strasburger Tarnowski
- Profession: Economist

Henryk Leon Strasburger (27 May 1887 – 2 May 1951) was a Polish economist, general commissioner in the Free City of Danzig (now Gdańsk) and delegate to the League of Nations. He was also a member of the Polish government in exile during World War II. According to The New York Times, he was among the earliest Polish politicians to warn about the threat posed by Hitler to his Poland. His warning was clear in his book The Case of Danzig, published some months before the outbreak of war.

== Early years ==
He was born on 25 May 1887 in Warsaw, to Juljan Teofil Strasburger (half-brother of Eduard Adolf Strasburger) and Marja (Julia Maria) Simmler, daughter of Joseph Simmler. Their ancestors were of German ethnics which had assimilated into Polish people. His schooling was at Heidelberg and Kharkov universities.

== Career ==
From 1916 to 1918, he was the director of the Polish Industrial Association. After World War I, Strasburger was a member of the first Polish government, as undersecretary in the Ministry of Commerce and Industry from 1918 to 1923, as well as holding the position of undersecretary of state in the Ministry of Foreign Affairs in 1923. He was a member of the Polish peace delegation at Riga in 1921, and a delegate to the League of Nations in 1923 and 1924. He conducted commercial treaty negotiations with Italy, France, Romania, Yugoslavia, Finland, Belgium, and Japan.

He then joined the Polish Foreign Office, and from 1924 to 1932 he was general commissioner (commissariat) of the Polish Republic (Komisarz Generalny Rzeczpospoltej Polskiej), responsible for the liaison between the Senate and the Polish government in the Free City of Danzig. He resigned in 1932 and was replaced by Dr. Kazimierz Papée. This was an unusual move that drew international attention since it seemed to mark an important change in Polish policy towards Danzig, as the supposedly free city was becoming a centre for Berlin Nationalist activities.

Strasburger was granted a degree of autonomy in managing relations with the Danzig authorities, and during the early part of his tenure, reports suggest an improvement in Polish-Danzig diplomatic exchanges, but difficulties increased in his last two years in office, caused by the rise of a new Nationalist-led Senate in the Free City, which included members sympathetic to German nationalist movements. The Senate became increasingly hostile towards Poland, and after a public dispute in 1931 between Strasburger and the president of Danzig, Dr. Ernst Ziehm, Strasburger offered his resignation but it was not accepted. When he tried again to resign in 1932, the Polish government decided that Danzig-Polish policies would be made in Warsaw, not in Danzig. From 1932 to 1939, he was the president of the Central Organisation of Polish Industries.

After the 1939 German invasion of Poland, Strasburger became part of the Polish government in exile. From 1939 to 1942 he was the Polish Minister of Finance, Industry and Commerce in the Sikorski government. In 1942, he was the individual who announced to the world in New York City that over one million Polish Jews had been killed.

In 1943, he became the Minister in the Middle East. Following the war he made the choice of serving the Warsaw government controlled by the Communists, as ambassador to Great Britain in 1945 and 1946. He broke with this government in 1949 and stayed in London with his wife and children.

He died on 2 May 1951, in London, while still in exile.

== Family ==
Around 1926, he married Olga Dunin (1902–1972), daughter of Rodryg Dunin. They had two children, Henryk and Teresa.

== Writing ==
- "German Designs on Pomerania; An Analysis of Germany's Revisionistic Policy", 1934, Torun, The Baltic institute
- "The Core of a Continent: Problems of Central and Eastern Europe", 1943, Philadelphia, The American Academy of Political and Social Science
- The Case of Danzig, 1936
- Foreign Trade in the Service of National Economy, 1939
