= Polish Northern Front (1920) =

The Northern Front was one of the largest strategic formations of the Polish Army. An equivalent to an army group in armed forces of other countries, it was created on May 17, 1920, by order of Polish Commander-in-Chief General Józef Piłsudski, the front took part in the Polish-Soviet War. Its forces were instrumental in defeating the Red Army in the Battle of Warsaw and again in the Battle of the Niemen River. By August 1920 the units comprising the front numbered some 90,000 men at arms.

Initially named Szeptycki's Front (Polish: Front Szeptyckiego), after its commanding officer Gen. Stanisław Szeptycki, on July 5 it was renamed to North-Eastern Front and then again on August 6 to Northern Front.
