= Gazeta Polska (1929–1939) =

Gazeta Wyborcza
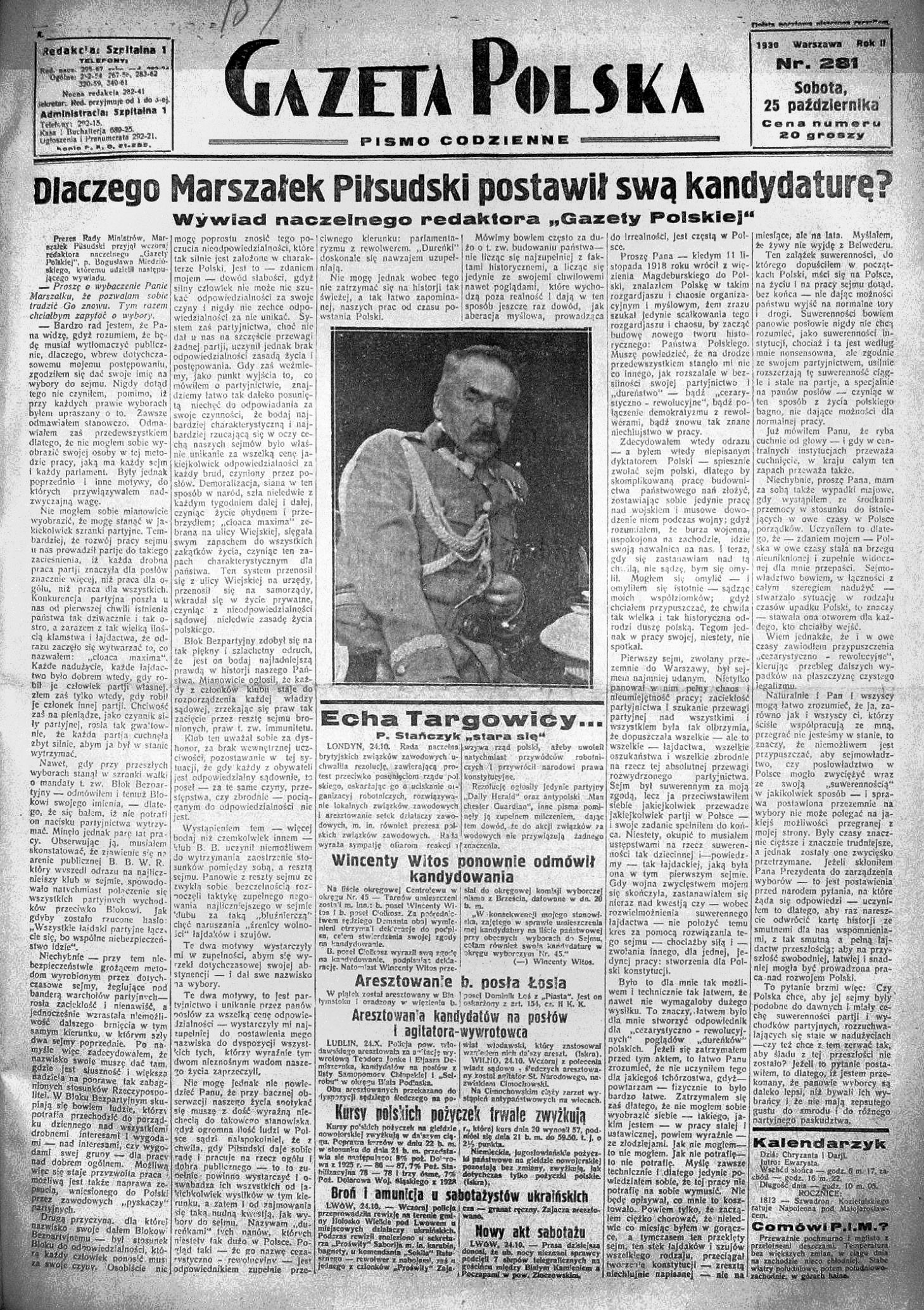
- Front page of Gazeta Polska, 5 October 1930
- Type: Daily newspaper
- Editor-in-chief: Adam Koc (1929-1931); Bogusław Miedziński (1931-1938)
- Founded: 1929
- Ceased publication: 1939
- Political alignment: pro-Sanation
- Language: Polish
- Headquarters: Warsaw
- Country: Poland
- Circulation: 30,000

Gazeta Polska was an important newspaper in the interwar Poland, published from 1929 to 1939 in Warsaw. It had a strong pro-Sanation bias and was seen as a semi-official news outlet of the Sanation-dominated Polish government of the second half of the 1930s. Within Sanation politics, Gazeta Polska supported "the colonels" and, later, Edward Rydz-Śmigły. It often voiced calls for more authoritarian government and for harsher treatment of the opposition.

The newspaper's circulation grew from 15,000 in the early 1930s to 30,000 in the latter part of the decade. The paper was closed in the aftermath of the German invasion of Poland, along with most other Polish newspapers. The newspaper was reactivated in 1941 in Palestine by Kański and was the most popular Polish newspaper in the Middle East until 1947.

== Editorial board ==
Its successive editors-in-chief were Adam Koc (1929–1931), Bogusław Miedziński (1931–1938) and Mieczysław Starzyński (1938–1939). Journalists associated with the newspaper included Juliusz Kaden-Bandrowski and Kazimierz Wierzyński. In his correspondence, Winston Churchill criticized the paper for becoming one of the victims of the 1934 German–Polish Press Agreement, which prohibited the publication of material that might be "prejudicial to good relations between the two countries."
