= Bloody Wednesday (Poland) =

1906 attack in Poland

- Part of Revolution in Poland (1905-1907)
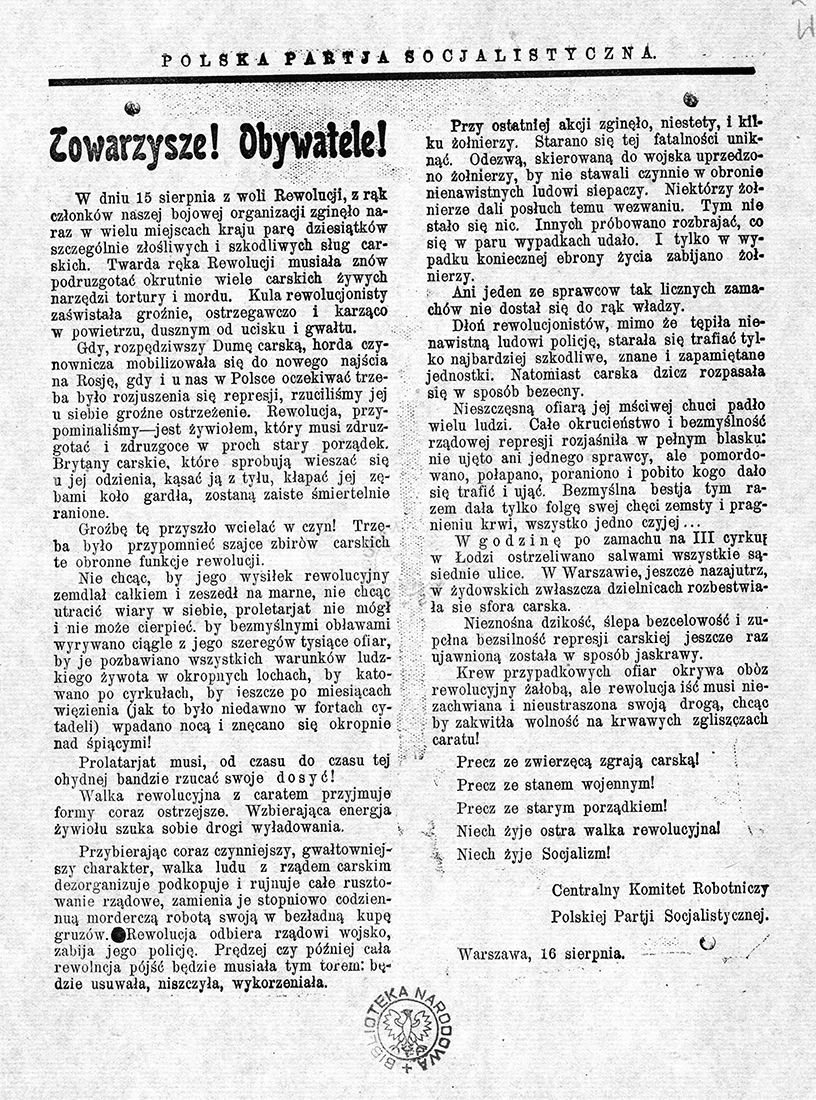
- Proclamation issued by the Polish Socialist party after Bloody Wednesday
- Location: Various cities, Congress Poland
- Date: 15th August 1906
- Target: Russian officials
- Deaths: Approximately 200 in total (80 officials, over 100 civilians)
- Injuries: 43 or 69 officials injured
- Perpetrator: OB PPS
- Motive: Political Repression in Poland (1795-1918); Anti-Russian sentiment Revolution in Poland (1905-1907)

Bloody Wednesday (Polish: Krwawa środa) refers to the events of 15 August 1906 in the (Congress) Kingdom of Poland, where the Combat Organization of the Polish Socialist Party (OB PPS) carried out a series of attacks on Russians, primarily police officers and informants. This took place in the context of the Revolution in the Kingdom of Poland (1905–1907), and represented one of the biggest actions in the history of OB PPS.

== Events ==
The aim of OB PPS was to stop repressions following in the wake of the revolution, and demonstrate its strength to the Russian government. It organized a series of simultaneous attacks on Russian officials, primarily policemen, in the Russian partition of Poland that occurred on August 15, 1906.

There were about 100 incidents, with attacks reported in 18, 19 or 20 cities and towns. Sources vary significantly with regards to the number of fatalities, reporting about 80, 70, or 51, fatalities among Russian officials (primarily policeman) and informants (see Okhrana), and 43 or 69 injured. In Warsaw alone, sources note "over 100 civilian casualties"; another notes 50 Russian policemen killed and 100 wounded, Yet another talks of about 200 fatalities. There, an OB PPS group led by Henryk Baron attacked police offices and clashed with a Cossack military unit, which led to a panic in the Russian garrison, suspecting an uprising, and the retreat of some military units from the town. There was also a demonstration at Grzybowski Square. Another large assault took place in Łódź, where a 25-strong OB PPS group under F. Lipiński attacked a police station, and ambushed several patrols.

== Aftermath ==
Three days later, on 18 August 1906, OB PPS carried out another of its landmark operations, when OB PPS female activist Wanda Krahelska-Filipowicz attempted to assassinate the Russian Governor-general of Warsaw, Georgi Skalon, in Warsaw.

OB PPS was not fully united behind this operation; it was notably opposed by Józef Piłsudski. Other, more moderate organizations like Social Democracy of the Kingdom of Poland and Lithuania and Bund were also critical of this operation. The Russian response was a new wave of arrests and persecution of anti-state activists. The Imperial Russian Army terrorized worker districts in Warsaw, Łódź and other towns; the most infamous of the reprisal actions was the Russian-organized Siedlce pogrom on 8–10 September 1906.

Those events became among the best known actions of the OB PPS. They were also among the biggest terrorist-like events in the history of OB PPS. It also marked the high point of OB PPS activity, which would wind down over the next year or so.

== See also ==
- Łódź revolution
- Rewolucyjni Mściciele
- Massacre of Jews
