= Polish resistance =

Polish Resistance may refer to:

== 1569–1795 ==
- Repnin Sejm
- Bar Confederation
- Great Sejm
- Kościuszko Uprising
- Greater Poland Uprising (1794)

== 1795–1918 ==
- Greater Poland Uprising (1806)
- November Uprising
- Greater Poland Uprising (1846)
- Kraków Uprising
- Greater Poland Uprising (1848)
- January Uprising
- Organic work
- Revolution in the Kingdom of Poland (1905–1907)
- Łódź insurrection (1905)
- Greater Poland Uprising (1918–1919)

== 1918–1939 ==
- Polish Armed Forces in the West
- Sejny Uprising
- Silesian Uprisings

== 1939–1945 ==
- Polish Underground State
  - Armia Krajowa (the Home Army), Polish underground army in World War II (400 000 sworn members)
  - Narodowe Siły Zbrojne (National Armed Forces)
  - Bataliony Chłopskie
  - Gwardia Ludowa (the People's Guard) and Armia Ludowa (the People's Army)
  - Związek Organizacji Wojskowej, at Auschwitz concentration camp
  - Żydowska Organizacja Bojowa (ZOB, the Jewish Fighting Organisation), Jewish resistance movement that led the Warsaw Ghetto Uprising in 1943
  - Żydowski Związek Walki (ZZW, the Jewish Fighting Union), Jewish resistance movement that led the Warsaw Ghetto Uprising in 1943

== 1945–1989 ==
- Anti-communist resistance in Poland (disambiguation)
- Cursed soldiers (1944–1947)
- Poznań 1956 protests
- Polish 1970 protests
- Pope John Paul II
- Solidarność
