= Siedlce pogrom =

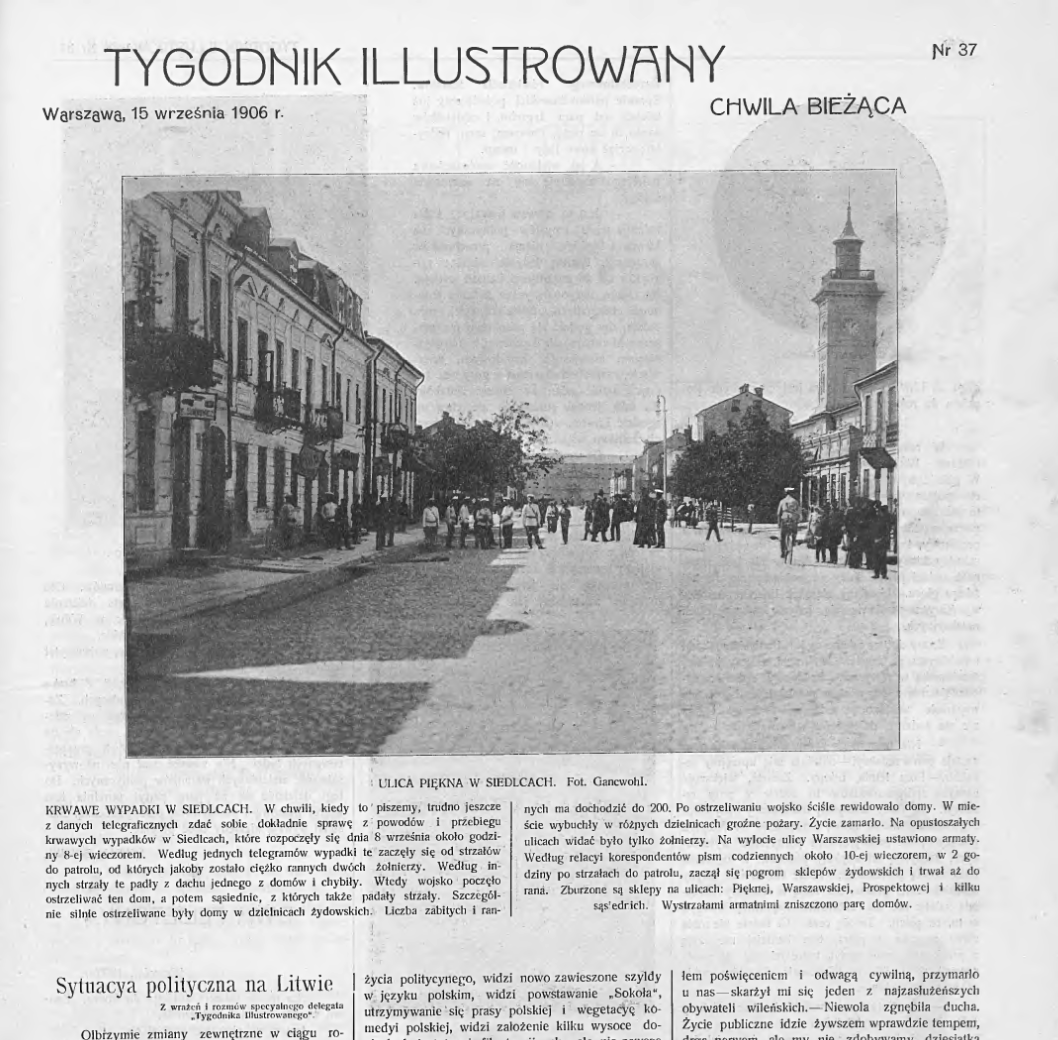
Early report about the pogrom in the Warsaw-based Tygodnik Illustrowany weekly, September 15, 1906

Siedlce pogrom refers to the events of September 8–10 or 11, 1906, in Siedlce, (Congress) Kingdom of Poland. It was part of a wave of pogroms in Russia and controlled territories (such as the Kingdom of Poland), in the larger context of the widespread unrest. The pogrom in Siedlce was organized by the Russian secret police (Okhrana). There were 26 fatalities among the Jewish populations.

== Background ==
Siedlce had a significant Jewish population (estimated at 10,000 to 64% out of 24,000 total (so about 15,000)). In the larger context of the widespread unrest it was the site of socialist and Polish patriotic agitation and demonstrations (organized by Polish Socialist Party and Jewish Bund), and the government desired to make a vivid response to the Bloody Wednesday, a series of attacks on government officials organized by PPS that took place barely a months earlier, and other similar events. On August 26 an OB PPS activist, disguised as a Jew, assassinated a Russian police captain in Siedlce. As many Jews took part in the protests, the Russian government saw the Siedlce as a ripe territory to show its force.

Siedlce was not the only place where the Russian police and military terrorized workers who were seen as sympathizing with the PPS and other opposition organizations; similar excesses occurred in Warsaw and Łódź, but were directed against the workers in general, not Jews in particular.

== Pogrom ==
The pogrom, planned systemically "for some time", took place on September 7 or 8 to 9, 10 or 11), 1906. It was organized by the Russian secret police (Okhrana), in particular by Colonel Tichonowski, who was tasked with the preparations. Anti-semitic pamphlets had been distributed for over a week and before any unrest begun, a curfew was declared.

The primary perpetrators were Russian soldiers from the Liepāja (libawski) infantry regiment. They had replaced the Ostrołęka garrison, previously garrisoning the town, which had been deemed too sympathetic to the local residents. The soldiers were ordered to start shooting on the town square; soon afterwards, they were ordered to set some fires, and allowed to loot Jewish stores at will. Artillery pieces were used, as noted even in the official news reports. Some sources also report the involvement of Black Hundreds, which had no native presence in the Kingdom of Poland, and would have had to have been brought in by the authorities from the Empire proper. Most of the shops in the town were destroyed and looted, and there were many cases of arson; private (Jewish) homes were also broken into and looted. Official military reinforcements from nearby garrisons were moved to Siedlce. In the meantime, Russian officials were demanding from the Jewish community that the "bandits" who had opened fire on the soldiers be turned in.

There were 26 fatalities among the Jewish population, and an unspecified, larger number, into the hundreds, were reported as injured. The Polish populace helped to shelter the Jews. About 1000 people were arrested. According to official sources, the military and police suffered no casualties.

== Aftermath ==
The official story spun by Russian propaganda was that the events in Siedlce were triggered by "revolutionaries", whose plot has been discovered and put down by the police and the army. Despite their leading role in the pogrom, some soldiers and policemen were recognized with medals or honorable mentions. OB PPS carried out a successful assassination of one of high-ranking Russian officials involved in organizing the Siedlce pogrom, Colonel Obruczew, in December of that year. Nonetheless, the fact that the Combat Organization of the Polish Socialist Party (OB PPS), which organized the events of Bloody Wednesday, took no other significant action in response to the Siedlce pogrom, was, in the words of one of the PPS leaders, Józef Piłsudski, "a moral defeat" for OB PPS; further, it demonstrated to OB PPS that they had no power to stop the Russian military from carrying out such brutal demonstrations of force at any time and place of their choosing.

One of the responses of the Siedlce pogrom was the organization of Jewish self-defense groups in many cities and towns, although according to other sources, those groups existed before that pogrom, even in Siedlce. The pogrom has been widely condemned in public opinion in Poland and abroad and by most Polish political parties. The Polish press was unanimous in denouncing these acts of violence. Polish and Jewish deputies to the Russian parliament (the Duma) demanded an investigation, which eventually reached the conclusion that the events were caused by some soldiers acting without official orders. The outcome was disappointing for the Russians, and dissuaded the Russian government from organizing more pogroms in Poland, as the Siedlce and Białystok pogroms proved to be failures, with the Polish populace steadfastly refusing to support the Russian forces, and sufficient independent and political coverage and investigation so that little effective propaganda could be disseminated in the aftermath. In particular, the fact that official investigation of the events in Siedlce and Białystok had to conclude that they were not the fault of local populace, but of the Russian army (even if the blame was laid on disobedient soldiers), represented a major loss of face for the government. This pogrom was one of the last, if not the last, of the significant pogroms in the Russian Empire and related territories in the period following the Russian Revolution of 1905.
