= Marek Kubliński =

Polish resistance fighter (1931–1950)

Marek Kubliński (27 September 1931 – 4 October 1950) was a Polish Boy Scout and high school student. He is known for his activities as an anticommunist freedom fighter.

== Life ==
Marek Kubliński was born in Maków Podhalański, a town some 52 km (32 mi) south of Kraków, in the family of Dr. Jerzy Kubliński, a judge during the period of the Second Polish Republic who after the War had a private practice as barrister-at-law (adwokat) in a locality called Sucha. It is a matter of public record that Dr. Jerzy Kubliński applied for admission to the Kraków bar association (izba adwokacka) in March 1946, and it can therefore be assumed that he transferred his practice and his residence to Kraków at the time — when Kubliński was 14-years' old. In Kraków, Kubliński attended the John III Sobieski High School No. 3 (designation since changed to No. 2), one of the best secondary-education institutes in town, the alma mater of such people as Cardinal Franciszek Macharski who succeeded Pope John Paul II, formerly Cardinal Wojtyła, as the archbishop of Kraków (see pictures to the right). The school is situated in the Kleparz neighbourhood of the central Old Town district, the most conservative part of an otherwise generally conservative city.

== In history and literature ==
After the collapse of Communism, Kubliński posthumously had a street named after himself in Kraków, and another one in the city of Skawina. Both streets are single-lane cul-de-sacs ending in fields, the Kraków ulica Marka Kublińskiego being about 150 metres' long, unpaved and situated on the outskirts of the peripheral district of Nowa Huta which did not exist in Kubliński's lifetime. But it is a street, with about eleven or twelve houses having the official address that incorporates Kubliński's name. There is a commemorative plaque honouring Marek Kubliński and Bohdan Różycki at the John III Sobieski High School which they attended together in Kraków. The person and the case of Marek Kubliński are treated fictionally in the 2010 book — a fictional autobiography — by the filmmaker and writer Janusz Majewski, Mała matura ("The Little School-leaving Exam"). While a work of fiction, the book is of first importance to the understanding of the background against which the events described in the present article played themselves out and the atmosphere of the period. Majewski, Kubliński's peer in age, went to the same Kraków high school with Kubliński, but was in a younger class at the time and does not appear to have been personally acquainted with Kubliński. "I was not a direct participant in the events", he declares in an interview. Thus, while Majewski cannot be accepted as a trusted insider witness to the events in question, his report is valuable for the version of events circulating at the time among the generality of the school's pupils, and for the sociopolitical atmosphere of the Kraków of the period. On Christmas Eve in 2010 the newspaper Rzeczpospolita published an interview with Majewski on the occasion of the launch of the book, in which Majewski provided additional — this time unfictionalized — facts concerning the case of Marek Kubliński. The new facts of value to the story of Marek Kubliński are not new recollections of Majewski (who as already mentioned lacks privileged first-hand information of the case) but the information that Majewski was able to unearth during research for his 2010 book in the archives of the Kraków branch of the Instytut Pamięci Narodowej. The documents show that Kubliński's mother was allowed to spend with him in the Montelupich Prison in Kraków, the last night before his execution. Majewski comments: "I do not know if this was an act of mercy or an additional punishment".

== See also ==
- Cursed soldiers
- Polish resistance

== Bibliography ==
- Zbigniew Szpil, Dobra pamięć, Kraków, Wydawnictwo Multiphoto, 2007. ISBN 8392535308, ISBN 9788392535300.
- Janusz Majewski, Mała matura, Warsaw, Wydawnictwo Marginesy, 2010. ISBN 8392843118, ISBN 9788392843115.
- Krzysztof Masłoń, "Daj Boży zdrowi!" (An interview with Janusz Majewski), Rzeczpospolita, 24 December 2010. (See online.)
- Janusz Mika, "Okupacja nad Młynówką: rozmowa ze Zbigniewem Szpilem, autorem książki Dobra pamięć" (The Nazi Occupation on the River Młynówka: A Conversation with Zbigniew Szpil, the Author of the Book Dobra pamięć), Krowodrza.pl. (See online.)
- Stanisław Grzybowski, "Dojrzewanie w cieniu historii" (Growing Up in the Shadow of History), Kraków: miesięcznik społeczno-kulturalny, 2011. ISSN 1733-0459. (See online.) (A review of Janusz Majewski's book Mała matura by a person who, in contradistinction to Majewski, was privy to the events surrounding the person of Kubliński, and was a co-accused at the trial of the latter — the historian, Professor Stanisław Grzybowski (b. 1930).)
- Janusz Wróblewski, "Stary ma o czym opowiadać: rozmowa z Januszem Majewskim" (The Old One has Things to Talk About: A Conversation with Janusz Majewski), Polityka, 14 April 2011. (See online.)
- Tadeusz M. Płużański, Bestie: mordercy Polaków, 2nd ed., Warsaw, 3S Media, 2012. ISBN 9788361935162.
- "Lista harcerek i harcerzy straconych w więzieniach Urzędu Bezpieczeństwa Publicznego oraz przy próbie aresztowania w latach 1944–1956" ("A List of Girl- and Boy Scouts Executed in the Prisons of the Urząd Bezpieczeństwa Publicznego or Murdered at Time of Arrest during the years 1944–1956") on II Konspiracja Harcerska, 1944–1956 website. (With picture of Marek Kubliński.)
