= Polish Insurrection =

Polish Insurrection, Poland Insurrection and Insurrection of Poland may refer to

- Polish insurrection of 1830-31
- Polish Insurrection of 1863
- Polish Insurrection of 1905
- Polish Insurrection of 1944

== See also ==
- Kosciuszko Insurrection
