= Jan Wacław Machajski =

Polish anarchist (1866–1926)

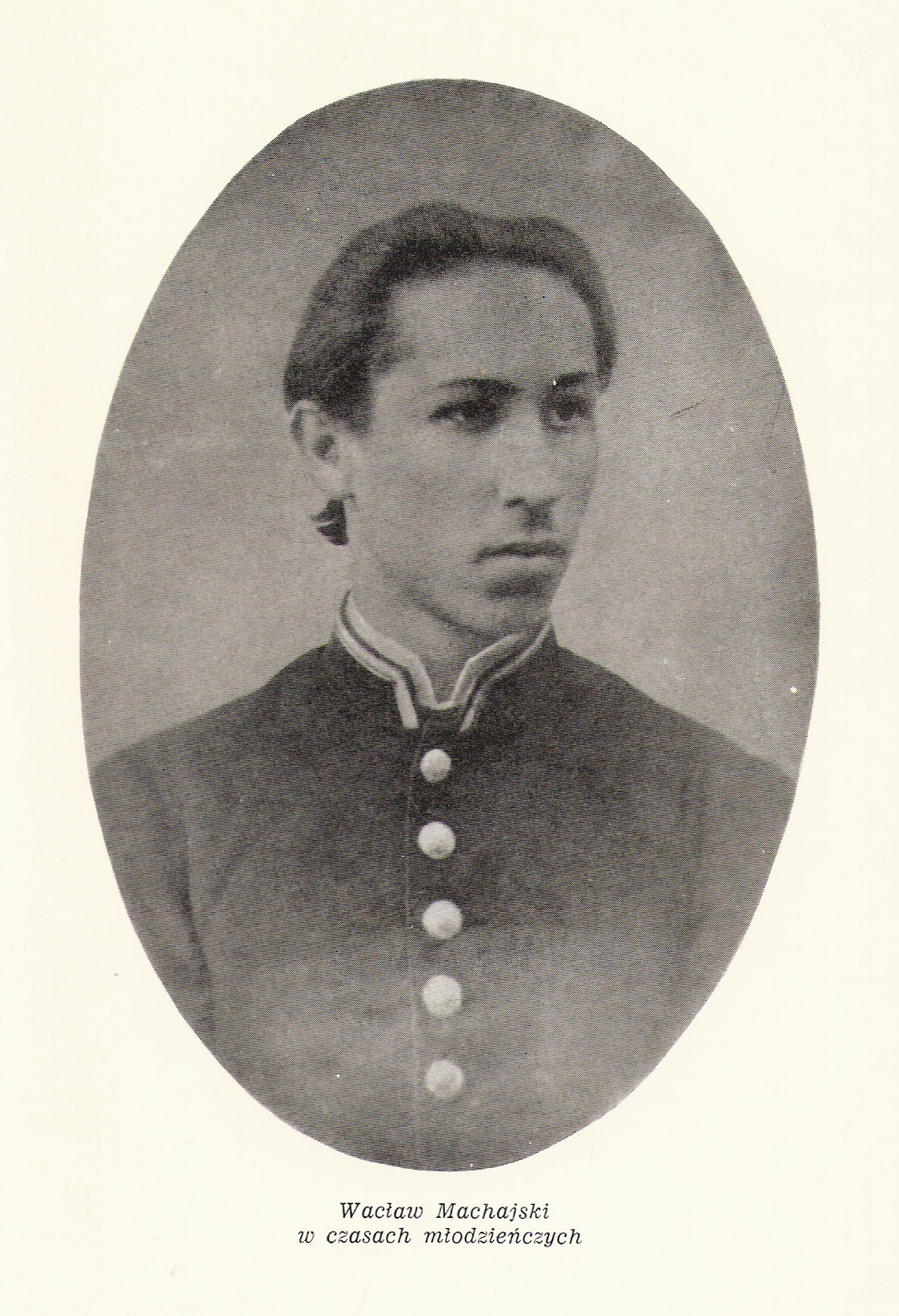
- Born: Jan Wacław Machajski; 27 December 1866; Busko-Zdrój, Congress Poland
- Died: 19 February 1926 (aged 59); Moscow, USSR
- Other names: A.Wolski; A.Vol'ski; Jan Kizlo; Makhaev
- Occupation: Copyist

Jan Wacław Machajski (pseudonym A. Wolski (A. Vol'ski), often corrupted in Russian as Makhaev; 27 December 1866 – 19 February 1926) was a Polish revolutionary whose methodology drew from both anarchism and Marxism whilst criticising both as being products of the intelligentsia.

== Life ==
Machajski was born on 27 December 1866 in Busko-Zdrój. The son of a poor Polish official, Machajski was briefly attracted to Polish nationalism as a student, but abandoned it for internationalism and socialism. He was arrested and exiled to Siberia in 1892, where he began to develop his critique of Marxist revisionism in German and Russian socialism.

== Workers' Conspiracy in Kraków 1908–1909 ==
The failure of the Revolution in the Kingdom of Poland (1905–07) created opportunities for revolutionary activity in Poland. In early 1908 he published a single issue of Rabochii zagovor (Workers' Conspiracy) in Geneva. after which he moved illegally to Kraków in Galicia. Here he assumed the name Jan Kizlo and had low-paid work as a copyist. He and his wife also received financial support from his brother. He was also involved in revolutionary activity with Max Nomad. Thanks to an activist called simply "Kolya" who worked at the imperial mint in St. Petersburg, Machajski was able to appropriate 25,000 roubles to fund the propaganda work of Workers' Conspiracy. This included more issues of the magazine Rabochii zagovor, translations of his writing and other material. During this period the Polish Social Democratic Party of Galicia (PPSD) was aligned with the Polish Socialist Party – Revolutionary Faction, which stressed national independence over internationalism. Initially Nomad and Machajski proved quite successful in recruiting some of their membership, which led to various smears by the PPSD, including meetings arranged simply to denounce them, on occasion involving their leader, Ignacy Daszyński.

== Arrest in Zakopane ==
By the end of 1909 Nomad had left, and Machajski followed suit moving to Zakopane, where he "was arrested and sentenced to two weeks' imprisonment for illegal residence and registration under a false name, and then was allowed to leave Austria. In the spring of 1911, he and his wife settled in Paris", where they lived for six years in relative obscurity.

== During the Russian Revolution ==
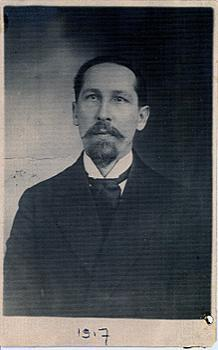
Machajski in 1917

Machajski moved to Petrograd in 1917, where he linked up with former comrades such as Bronislav Mitkevich and launched another Machajskist organisation. In June–July 1918 they published in Moscow Rabochaia revoliutsiia (The Workers' Revolution) which restated his views in the context of the successful Bolshevik seizure of power. Here he displayed a certain ambivalence towards the Bolsheviks. He argued that their regime was offering a radical version of the "bourgeois revolution," with a parliamentary system and unfettered capitalism. This Machajski viewed as the inescapable outcome of socialist politics which would place the intelligentsia as a class in power. Thus Machajski argued that the Bolsheviks were an updated version of the Jacobins of the French Revolution. Their democratisation of the bourgeois system would only benefit the lower strata of the intelligentsia but offer nothing to the workers.

== Ideas ==
Influenced by Bakunin, he argued – in opposition to Karl Kautsky – that the class interest of intellectuals, including Marxist social democrats, was opposed to that of manual workers, since the unproductive labour of intellectuals depended upon preserving a hereditary monopoly on education at workers' expense. Rather than put their hopes in political revolution, manual workers needed to concentrate upon pressing their economic demands through a mass general strike, until their wages equalled those of the intellectual worker and there could be a socialization of knowledge. Revolution would consist of a violent revolt of the unemployed worker-peasant.

Machajski thus attempted a theoretical synthesis of anarchist political critique and Marxist political economy and theory of history (historical materialism), by applying the Marxist critique of class-dominated ideology to Marxism itself. Machajski theorised a "state capitalist" moment of social development, approximating the seizure of power by intellectuals of the state apparatus, and the oppression of the working class by intellectuals acting to further capitalism in its dying days. In comparison, Machajski theorised socialism as the direct political control of economic institutions by the working class itself. Machajski's contributions foreshadowed the debate over the nature of the Soviet Union and the Soviet-style societies, including the critiques of Leninism, Stalinism and Maoism.

== Works ==
Machajski wrote predominantly in Russian. His writing is more available in Polish or French than English, though commentary on his ideas exists in English.

- Scientific Socialism (1899)
- The Evolution of Social Democracy (1899)
- The Intellectual Worker (1905)
- An Unfinished Essay in the Nature of a Critique of Socialism

== See also ==
- Anarchism and Marxism
