= Anti-communist resistance =

Anti-communist resistance may refer to:

- Soviet: Anti-Soviet partisans
- Poland: Anti-communist resistance in Poland
- Romania: Romanian anti-communist resistance movement
- Baltic States: Guerrilla war in the Baltic states
- Ukraine: Ukrainian Insurgent Army
- Germany: Werwolf
- Croatia: Crusaders
- Finland: Lapua Movement

== See also ==
- Anti-communism
