= Rewolucyjni Mściciele =

Revolutionary Avengers
- Rewolucyjni Mściciele
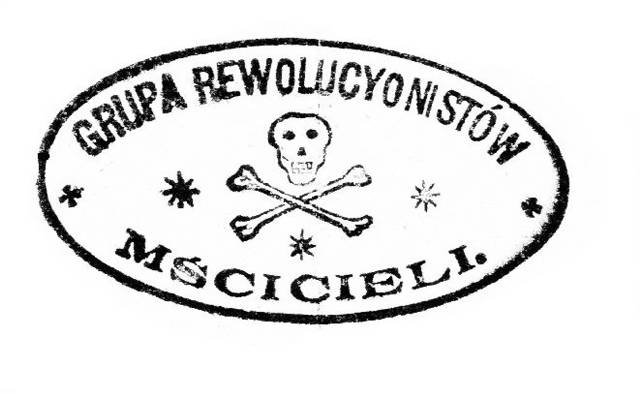
- Stamp of the group
- Leaders: Józef Piątek, Edward Dłużewski
- Dates active: October 1910–February 1914
- Country: Russian Poland
- Headquarters: Łódź
- Ideology: Anarcho-communism, Anarcho-syndicalism, Expropriative anarchism
- Political position: Far-left
- Size: 400

Rewolucyjni Mściciele (Polish for Revolutionary Avengers, also known as Grupa Rewolucjonistów Mścicieli, translated as Group of Revolutionaries and Avengers) was an anarchist movement operating mostly in Łódź in the Piotrków Governorate of Congress Poland in the years 1910–1914. It has been described as the most extreme terrorist organization in the history of Poland.

== Background ==
In the late 19th and early 20th centuries, the heavily urbanized and industrialized Łódź was a major Polish industrial center. In 1905 it was the site of the anarcho-socialist Łódź insurrection. The climate of the city was tense after the failed uprising that left over a hundred dead. Poor working conditions and actions such as lockouts, a 16-hour work day, no insurance, no pension, poor wages, and general anger amongst the populace created a situation fertile for socialist and anarchist organizers.

== History ==
The Rewolucyjni Mściciele group was formed in Łódź in fall of 1910. Its members came from small anarchist groups (such as Grupa Rewolucjonistów Terrorystów) and radical members of the Polish Socialist Party. Two direct founders were Edward Dłużewski and Józef Piątek. As a teenager, Dłużewski had focused on stealing from the rich. Piątek was a former member of the Combat Organization of the Polish Socialist Party, disillusioned with PPS, and less interested in fighting for Poland's independence (increasingly a major item for that organization) than in improving workers' condition.

The group expanded from Łódź to many other towns in the Russian partition of Poland: Warsaw, Częstochowa, Kraków, Radom, Kielce, Sosnowiec, Będzin, Ostrów, Kalisz, Żyrardów and Zgierz. It had over 400 members throughout that period of its existence. The group carried out many assassinations, assaults, and burglaries targeting members of the tsarist government and the bourgeoisie; about a hundred people died due to their actions. Their first target, around October 1910, was a known informant; next, they murdered an engineer who had raped a worker. They also killed policemen, secret informants, directors of factories, shopkeepers and innocent passers-by who got in their way. They robbed shops, banks and trains, and this financed the purchase of weaponry and supported the families of those who died in the "line of duty". The group paid attention to propaganda, distributing notes and sending letters to newspapers and the authorities. According to Adrian Sekura, author of the book on the group, who compares them to IRA and ETA, they were internationally known, with press articles describing their activities in United Kingdom and United States.

Despite the government setting large bounties on them, it proved difficult to crack the organization. On one hand, it was popular among many workers; on the other hand, those who did not sympathize with them were fearful of the group practice of murdering informants. Dłużewski died in the spring of 1911 as a result of the tip-off of an informant, who was later executed by the group when his betrayal was discovered. One year later, on the anniversary of Dłużewski's death, the group declared that they would kill all policeman they saw on the streets. On that day, 75% of the police officers did not turn up for work. In another well-known event, one of the group members survived a three-day siege in an attic; he killed a policeman, and then left the scene in his victim's uniform. In October 1939 Piątek was arrested. Heavily injured, Piątek was taken to hospital. He scared the policeman interviewing him into believing that he had a bomb, and according to reports, died laughing. Eventually, in around November 1913, a high-ranking member of the group, Michał Zakrzewski, was captured and successfully interrogated. The arrest enabled the group to be dismantled by the authorities by February next year, with 51 of its active members arrested. Due to outbreak of World War I, many of the accused were transported to Moscow, where the trials were finished. Many were executed, others were deported to Siberia.

== Philosophy and organization ==
The group was inspired by the philosophy of Jan Wacław Machajski, an anti-intelligentsia advocate refusing political activity and parties, and focusing on economic struggle, as well as anarcho-communism and anarcho-syndicalism. The group saw violence and "liberating" theft (expropriative anarchism) as justified tactics. Their plan was to avenge the mistreated workers, take the goods of bourgeoisie and fight with the tsarist government.

The organization had little formal structure, and no leader. All members had one vote during meetings, but during combat operations they selected a temporary commander whom they all swore to obey without question. Secrecy was paramount. As such, members took care not to carry identifying objects, and did not engage in any display of activism in public. Members who were caught often committed suicide; they would execute their wounded comrades so they would not be taken prisoner.

== Historiography ==
Stańczyk speculates that one of the reasons that the group was and still is relatively unknown was that after the communist takeover of Poland in the aftermath of World War II, research on "terrorist" communism was strongly discouraged.

== See also ==
- Anarchism in Poland
