= Białystok pogrom =

1906 pogrom in Białystok, Russian Empire (today Poland)

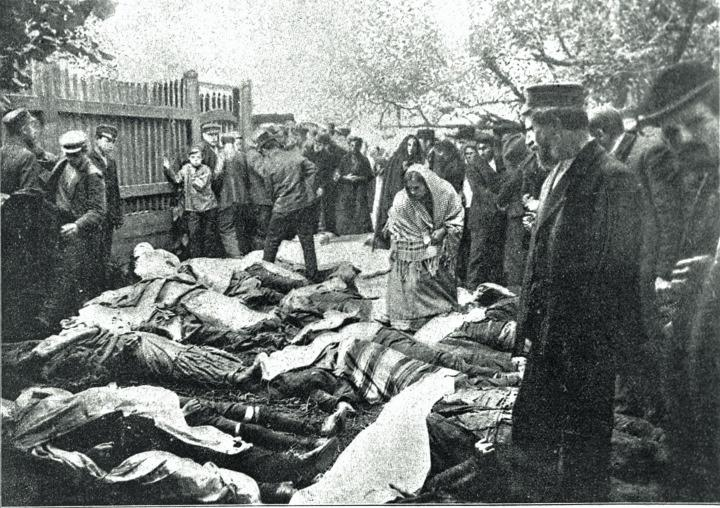
- Jews killed during the 14–16 June 1906 Białystok pogrom
- Location: Belostok, Russian Empire (modern-day Białystok, Poland)
- Date: 14–16 June 1906
- Deaths: 81–88
- Injuries: 90+
- Perpetrators: Russian soldiers and Black Hundreds

The Belostok (Białystok) pogrom occurred between 14 and 16 June 1906 (1–3 June Old Style) in Białystok, Poland (which at the time was part of the Russian Empire).

The names of 80 victims killed in the 1906 pogrom are recorded on a memorial pillar erected in a Białystok cemetery, though the exact number of casualties will likely never be known because victims were taken to multiple hospitals, other towns, and to private homes. 90 others were gravely wounded with both local police and the Imperial authorities held to blame for the tragedy.

The official Russian State Duma report on the pogrom found that it was pre-planned by the government and police administration and directly led to the systematic shooting of "peaceful Jewish residents, women, and children."

The Białystok pogrom was one of a series of violent outbreaks against Jews between 1903 and 1908, including the Kishinev pogrom, the Odessa pogrom, and the Kiev pogrom.

== Background ==
At the beginning of the 20th century, Białystok was a city with a predominantly Jewish population. In 1897, the Jewish population numbered 41,900 (out of about 66,000, or about 63%). Białystok was primarily a city known for its textile manufacturing, commerce and industry. During the 1905 Russian Revolution the city was a center of the radical labour movement, with strong organisations of the Bund and the Polish Socialist Party as well as the more radical anarchists of the Black Banner association.

In July 1903, anarchists shot at two local police officers after police broke up a labor demonstration. One officer was seriously wounded, while the other sustained no injuries.

In the summer of 1904, an eighteen-year-old anarchist, Nisan Farber, stabbed and seriously wounded Avraam Kogan, the owner of a spinning mill, as he walked to the synagogue on Yom Kippur. On October 6, Farber threw a bomb into a police station, injuring several policemen inside. Farber himself was killed by the explosion.

Martial law was declared in Białystok in September 1905, which lasted until March 1906. After martial law was lifted, the series of assassinations and acts of terror began anew. On March 4, the police officer Kulchitsky was killed, followed by the killings of gendarme officer Rubansky, and NCO Syrolevich, who were killed on March 18.

Later, the policemen Zenevich and Alekseychuk were wounded, three privates of the Vladimir infantry regiment were wounded and the Cossack Lopatin was killed.

These events led to a demoralization and disorganization of the police in the city. Between the years 1905 and 1906 there were seven police chiefs.

On 11 June 1906, the Police Chief of Białystok, Dierkacz, was murdered, most likely on the orders of the Russian commissar and fervent anti-semite Szeremietiev. Dierkacz was known for his liberal sympathies and opposition to anti-semitism; for this he was respected by both the Jewish Bund and the Polish Socialist Party. On a previous occasion, when Russian soldiers attacked Jews in the marketplace, Dierkacz had sent in his policemen to put down the violence and had declared that a pogrom against the Jews would occur “only over his dead body”. His murder was a foreboding of the violence to come, as people in the city noted that after Dierkacz's death Russian soldiers began preparing for a pogrom. The murder occurred on Surazhskaya Street, a hotbed of Jewish anarchism at the time, which led many to believe that he was murdered by Jewish anarchists. The local garrison was informed that he had been killed by Jewish anarchists.

On 14 June, two Christian processions took place: a Catholic one through the market square celebrating Corpus Christi and an Orthodox one through Białystok's New Town celebrating the founding of a cathedral. The Orthodox procession was followed by a unit of soldiers. These soldiers had been informed that the procession would be bombed by Jews. A bomb was thrown at the Catholic procession, and shots were fired at the Orthodox procession. A watchman of a local school, Stanislaw Milyusski, and three women, Anna Demidyuk, Aleksandra Minkovskaya and Maria Kommisaryuk, were wounded. These incidents constituted signals for the beginning of the pogrom. Witnesses reported that simultaneously with the shots someone shouted “Beat the Jews!” After the pogrom, a peasant who was arrested for unrelated charges in the nearby town of Zabłudów confessed that he had been paid a substantial amount of money to fire on the Orthodox procession in order to provoke the pogrom. Russian authorities falsely announced that Jews had fired on the Orthodox procession.

== The violence ==
Once the shots were fired, the violence began immediately. Mobs of thugs, including members of the Black Hundreds, began looting Jewish owned stores and apartments on Nova-Linsk Street. Policemen and soldiers who had earlier followed the Orthodox procession either allowed the violence to happen or participated in it themselves. The first day of the pogrom was chaotic. While units of the Czarist army, brought to Białystok by Russian authorities, exchanged fire with Jewish paramilitary groups, thugs armed with knives and crowbars dispersed throughout the main areas of the city to continue the pogrom. Some Jewish sections of the city were protected by self-defense units, usually organized by the labor parties, which moved against the thugs and looters. They were in turn fired upon by Czarist dragoons. Thanks to the Jewish self-defense units, several working-class sections of the city were spared the violence and thousands of lives were saved.

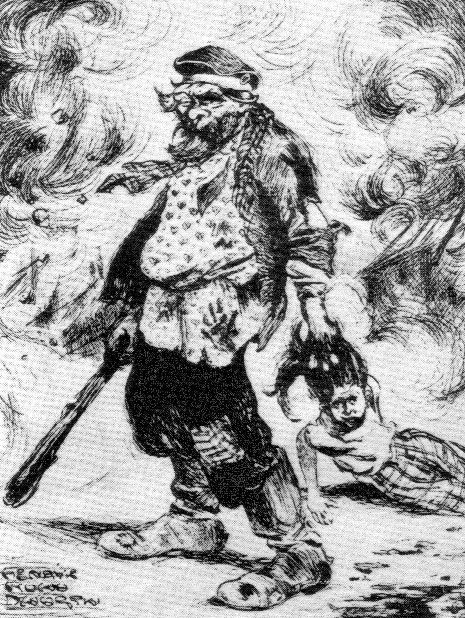
Caricature of participant in 1906 Białystok pogrom

In the following two days, the attacks on people and property became more systematic and directed, resembling a coordinated military action more than a spontaneous outbreak of violence. Marauding mobs and tsarist soldiers broke into many Jewish homes and either killed people on the spot or dragged them outside to murder them. It was only at the end of the third day that Stolypin, the Minister of Internal Affairs, instructed regional governors and mayors to suppress the pogrom. The violence ended abruptly upon the withdrawal of Russian troops from the city.

== Causes and effects ==
During the course of the pogrom 88 people were killed, including 82 Jews, although some sources list a higher number of 200. A total of 169 shops and houses had been plundered, among them the largest stores in the city. The pogrom was the subject matter of many news reports and articles, including a special manifesto issued by the Polish Socialist Party condemning the occurrence.

Russian authorities tried to blame the pogrom on the local Polish population in order to stir up the hatred between two ethnic groups (both of which generally opposed the Tsar). However Jewish survivors of the violence reported that the local Polish population had in fact sheltered many Jews during the pogrom and did not participate in it. Apolinary Hartglas, a Polish Jewish leader and later a member of the Polish Sejm, together with Ze'ev Jabotinsky, managed to obtain secret documents issued by Szeremietiev which showed that the pogrom had been organized well in advance by Russian authorities who had actually transported railroad workers from deep within the Russian Empire to participate. A commission set up by the Russian Duma charged with investigating the pogrom held both the local police and the central authorities to blame for the tragedy. In 1908, on the initiative of Constitutional Democratic deputies in the Duma, some of the perpetrators of the violence were tried but the trial was widely criticized for handing out light sentences to those convicted and for failing to bring the real organizers of the pogrom to justice.

== Monument to the victims ==
The victims of the pogrom were buried in a mass grave in the Bagnowka cemetery and a memorial obelisk was erected with a poem in Hebrew by Zalman Sznejur inscribed upon it. The poem begins with the words "Stand strong and be proud, you pillar of sorrow" and the monument came to be known as the Pillar of Sorrow. The monument survived through World War II and the Holocaust, and it still remains there, though one source falsely claims that it was destroyed after the war by unknown vandals.

== References in literature ==
The pogrom is mentioned in Yevgeni Yevtushenko's famous poem Babiyy Yar, about the murders of Jews in Babi Yar in Ukraine by Nazi Germany.

Veronia Schanoes' novella Burning Girls includes a fictionalized account of the pogrom.

== See also ==
- Revolution in the Kingdom of Poland (1905–1907)
- Melech Epstein who fought in the pogrom as a member of the Jewish self-defense force
- Siedlce pogrom
- Symphony No. 13 "Babi Yar" by Dmitri Shostakovich (referred to in 1st movement)
