= Juliusz Karol Kunitzer =

Polish industrialist, activist, and philanthropist (1843–1905)

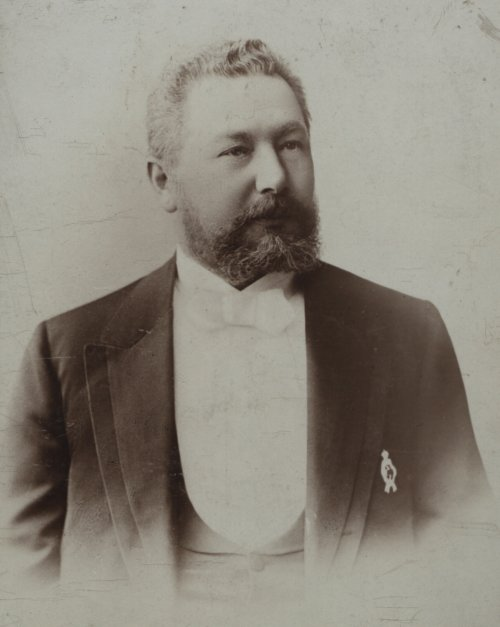

Juliusz Karol Kunitzer (German: Julius Kunitzer) (1843–1905) was a Polish industrialist, economic activist, philanthropist, and one of the industrial magnates of Łódź in Congress Poland. He owned a textile and later a joint stock company. His viciousness towards workers and cooperation with Russian authorities gained him notoriety among Łódż citizens. He was assassinated by Polish Socialist Party activists in the aftermath of the 1905 Łódź insurrection.

Kunitzer was a polarizing personality and career. Known among Łódź's elites as a shrewd businessman, "cotton king" who became a tycoon due to his personal skills and luck, respected for this and his philanthropy and other public initiatives, for others – particularly radicals and socialists, he was a vicious exploiter of workers and a leader of anti-labor industrialists.

== Biography ==
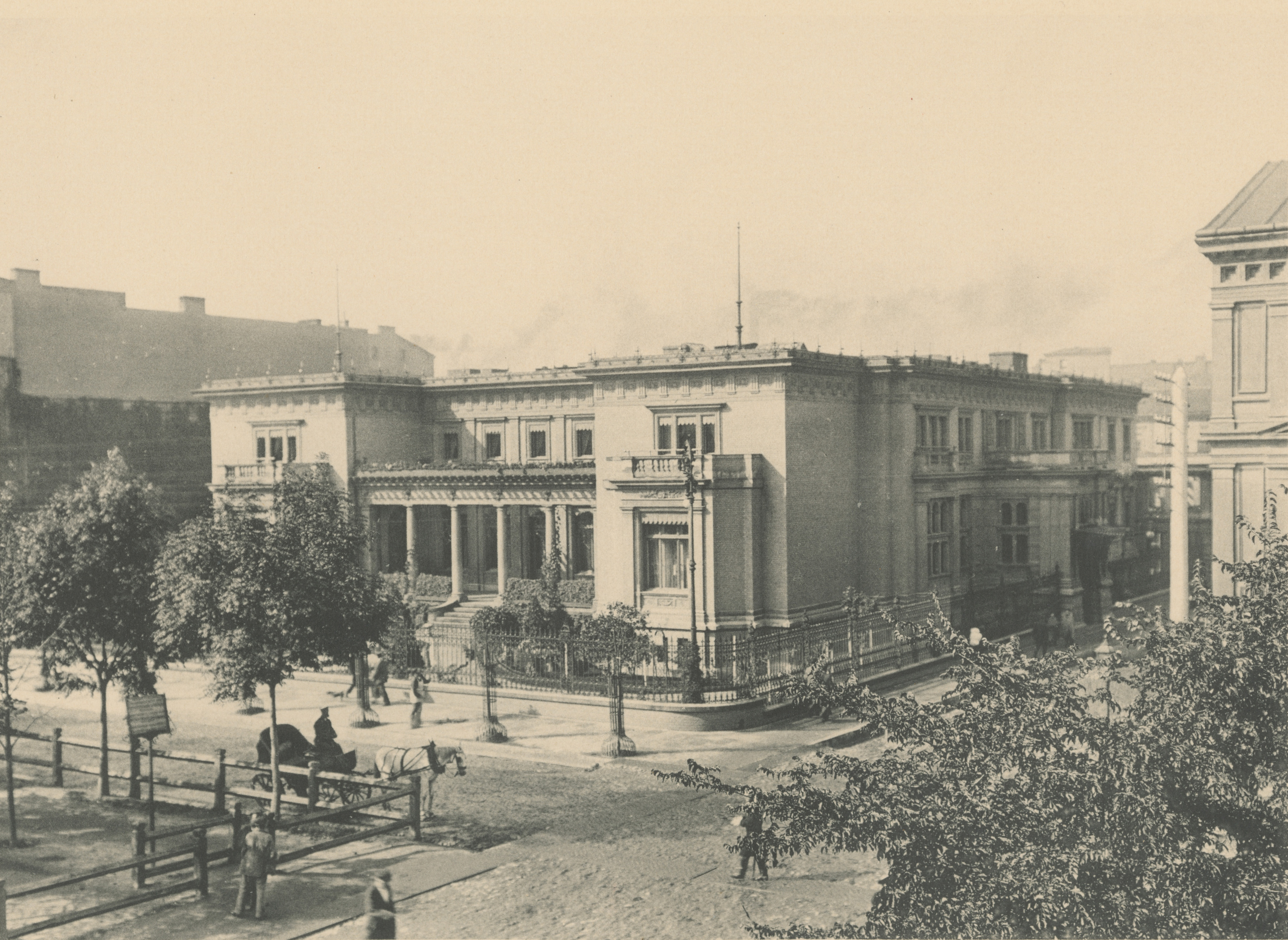
Kunitzer's villa, ul. Spacerowa 15, Łódź

Kunitzer was born on 19 September 1843 in Przedbórz, then Congress Poland (increasingly known as the Vistula Land). His family had roots in German burgher society, and moved to the Polish territories in the 1830s Kunitzer described himself as a Pole, including during a public speech to Russian businessmen in Nizhny Novgorod which caused a brief sensation. His father, Jakub, a weaver by profession, died in 1850, after which Juliusz with his mother moved to Tyniec. Young Kunitzer became a weaver, following his father's footsteps.

He came to Łódź in 1855. He joined the E. Hentschl's factory, quickly advancing to a managerial position. In 1869 he married Agnieszka Meyer, sister of the industrialist Ludwik Meyer. Using his wife's dowry, he invested in a construction of a new factory, which began operations in the following year. In partnership with Ludwik Meyer, in 1874, he bought the Hentschl's factory, damaged by the fire, and operated the "Kunitzer i Meyer" company. In 1879 he withdrew from that partnership, built cotton industry in the village of Widzew near Łódź, and began a different one with Theodor Julius Heinzel. Over the next few decades his factory complex expanded, with a dedicated railway line, worker's housing (150 homes), a hospital, a school, church, shops, and other buildings, which saw Widzew transformed from rural village to a quarter of Łódź.

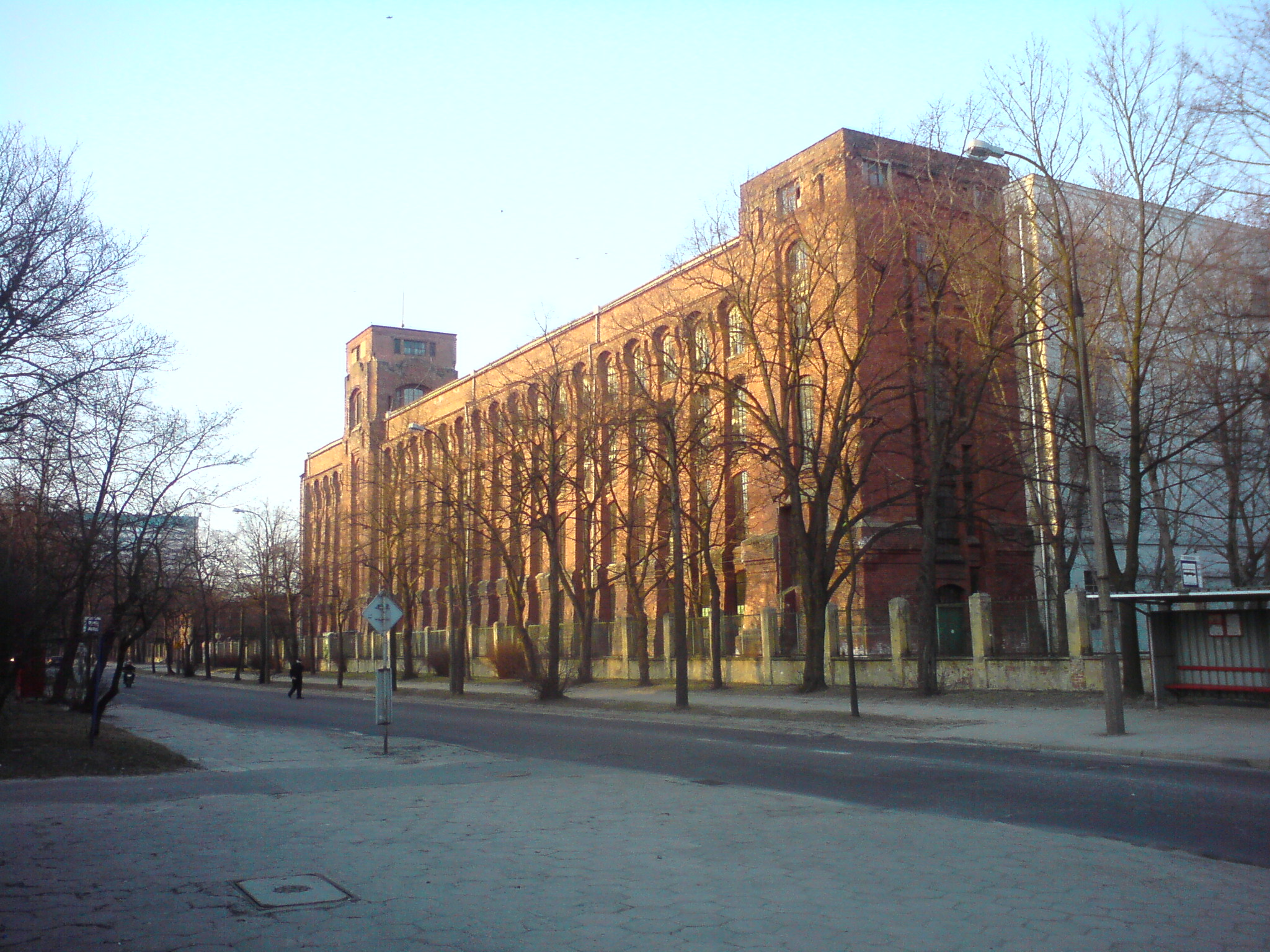
Heinzel & Kunitzer factory, Łódź-Widzew (2011)

Kunitzer was also involved in setting up an electric railway (the Koleje Elektryczne Łódzke S.A. and Łódzkie Wąskotorowe Elektryczne Koleje Dojazdowe S.A. stock companies) and in coal import company (Konsorcjum Węglowe "Kunitzer et Co."). He was a member of the board of many organizations (such as the Bank Handlowy). He also had investments outside Polish territories, for example in Russia, where he was involved in the iron mining and steelworking. He was also involved in philanthropy, and presided for many years over the Łódzkie Chrześcijańskie Towarzystwo Dobroczynności (Łódź Christian Society of Goodwill).

He was hated by the workers in Łódż, due to his particularly vicious treatment of employees in his factories, and due to fact that he remained in close contact and cooperated with Russian authorities Kunitzer often denied his workers their salaries in order to "teach them reason" which threatened them with hunger; such threat was also used to break down strike at his factory. Workers in his factory faced financial fines and payments In 1886 report by Russian authorities pointed out that Kunitzer's factory which employed 860 workers, had no first aid room where a doctor could help or examine an injured worker. Kunitzer's factories were also among two with lowest wages in Łódż and there was already a failed attempt to assassinate him in 1893. Kunitzer himself consequently acted against workers.

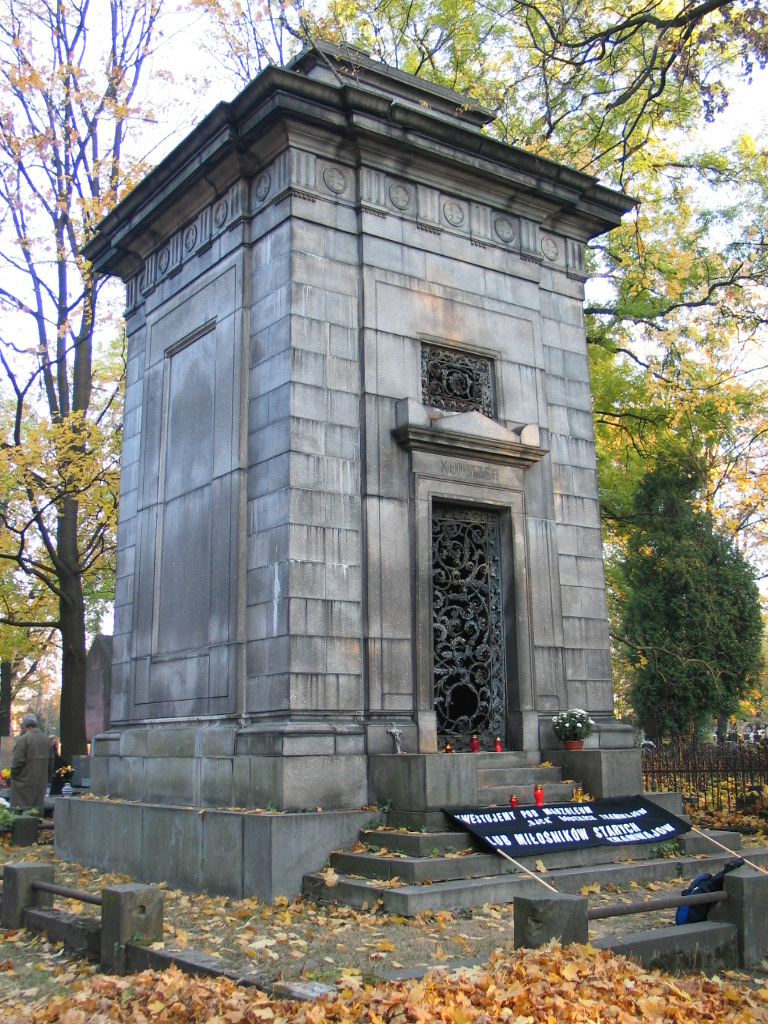
Kunitzer's mausoleum at the Old Cemetery of Łódź

On 30 September 1905 he was assassinated by Polish Socialist Party activists in the aftermath of the 1905 Łódź insurrection in which he refused any concessions to the workers. One of the assailants (Adolf Szulc) was captured; the second one escaped. The assailant confessed that hundreds of poverty stricken workers who were victims of Kunitzer were his motivation for the attack. His assassination became the topic of the day for Polish and Russian newspapers; the event was condemned by conservative media, and praised by the radical, socialist ones. His funeral on 3 October that year gathered thousands of people. He was buried at the Stary Cmentarz at Ogrodowa street, and his grave was marked by a simple, black tombstone.

In 1906 Heinzel & Kunitzer employed 3,343 workers. The Widzew enterprise was bought by Heinzel and Italians Tanfani and Farinola.
