= Combat Organization of the Polish Socialist Party =

Polish guerrilla organization

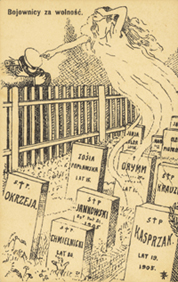
Postcard released by PPS around 1905–1907. Text in top left corner: 'Fighters for freedom'. Tombstones have names of PPS members who died in recent actions.

The Combat Organization of the Polish Socialist Party (Polish: Organizacja Bojowa Polskiej Partii Socjalistycznej, abbreviated OBPPS) was a Polish guerrilla resistance movement established in 1904 by Józef Piłsudski. It functioned as the paramilitary wing of the Polish Socialist Party.

The organization was most active between 1904 and 1908, growing to over 2,000 members, including more than 700 paramilitary fighters, and carrying out over 2,500 operations. At its peak, it boasted a membership of more than 5,000. Its primary objective was to mount an armed resistance movement against Imperial Russian rule in partitioned Poland. The group gradually declined and was dissolved in 1911.

Among its most notable actions were the Bloody Wednesday of 15 August 1906; the failed assassination attempt on Warsaw’s Governor-General, Georgi Skalon, on 18 August 1906; and the Bezdany raid, a large-scale train robbery on 26 September 1908.

== History ==
The first action of the Organizacja Bojowa took place soon after the PPS started to organize an increasing number of demonstrations (mostly in Warsaw). On October 28, 1904, Russian Cossack cavalry trampled the participants in one of the demonstrations; in revenge, on November 13 the 'Bojówki' opened fire on the Russian police and military during a new demonstration. First concentrating on fighting the spies and informants, in March 1905 'Bojówki' started using bombs to assassinate selected members of Russian police, both regular and secret (Okhrana) responsible for repression of Poles in the partitioned Poland. 'Bojówki' also assaulted Russian transports of money leaving the Polish territories. Among the most famous of these was the raid at Bezdany near Vilna in 1908, led by Piłsudski himself. The loot from that single raid (200,812 rubles–or approximately $100,000) was a virtual fortune in contemporary Central-Eastern Europe and equaled the amount 'Bojówki' had looted in the two previous years.

In 1906 alone, the 800-strong Bojówki, operating in five-man units in Congress Poland, killed 336 Russian officials; the number of casualties declined in the coming years; while the number of its members increased (to around 2,000 in 1908) but started declining significantly after 1908; in 1910 it numbered only 77 members.

Organizacja Bojowa as a military arm of the PPS was viewed unfavourably by the other Polish political force, the right-wing endecja. During the "June Days", as the Łódź uprising in 1905 came to be known in Poland, armed clashes broke out between gunmen loyal to Piłsudski's PPS and those loyal to Roman Dmowski's National Democratic Party (Endeks). It was also not unanimously supported by all members of the PPS; in November 1906, a faction of the party split off in protest of Piłsudski's leadership. The Piłsudski's faction was known as Old Faction or the Revolution Faction (Starzy, Frakcja Rewolucyjna), while their opponents were known as the Young Faction, Moderate Faction or the Left Wing (Młodzi, Frakcja Umiarkowana, Lewica). The Youngs sympathized with the Social Democracy of the Kingdom of Poland and Lithuania and believed that the priority should be cooperation with Russian revolutionaries in toppling the tsardom and creating a socialist utopia first, and negotiation for independence would be easier later. Piłsudski with his supporters from the revolutionary faction of the PPS, continued to plan a revolution against tsarist Russia. However, since then Organizacja Bojowa (temporarily known as Organizacja Bojowa PPS – Frakcja Rewolucyjna) – and Piłsudski – acted increasingly independent from the PPS, whose revolutionary faction would try to organize a more controlled organization called 'Milicja Robotnicza'. Nonetheless the Young faction would soon disappear and Piłsudski's faction would again take the leading role within the PPS.

Piłsudski anticipated a coming European war and the need to organize the officers of a future Polish army that could help win Poland's independence from the three empires that had partitioned her out of political existence in the late 18th century. One of the main goals of Organizacja Bojowa, other than providing funds for continuing activity and demonstrating the strength of Poland's underground, was to prepare a future cadre for the Polish Army. In 1906, Piłsudski, with the connivance and support of the Austrian authorities, founded a military school in Kraków for the training of Bojówki.

In 1908, Piłsudski transformed the "Combat Teams" to "Związek Walki Czynnej" (Association for Active Struggle), headed by three of his associates, Władysław Sikorski, Marian Kukiel, and Kazimierz Sosnkowski. ZWC was not the last paramilitary organization created by Piłsudski, who would go on to create the Związek Strzelecki (Riflemen's Association) and the Polish Military Organization before his final goal, Polish independence, was achieved in 1918.

== Notable operations ==
Its operations reached their zenith about 1904–1908, when it numbered over 2,000 members, including over 700 paramilitary personnel, and carried out over 2,500 operations. According to Leon Wasilewski, the organization had over 5,000 members at the height of its power. Afterwards it declined and was dissolved in 1911. Its goal was to create an armed resistance movement against the Imperial Russian authorities in partitioned Poland.

- Participation in the Łódź revolution, Łódź, 22–24 June 1905.
- Bloody Wednesday (15 August 1906) — assassinations of 80 Russian officials, mostly police officers, responsible for brutal repressions in Poland.
- Failed assassination attempt against the Governor-General of Warsaw, Georgi Skalon, 18 August 1906.
- Bezdany raid — a major train robbery, 26 September 1908.

== See also ==
- Revolution in the Kingdom of Poland (1905–1907)
- Rewolucyjni Mściciele
- SR Combat Organization
- Bolshevik Military Organizations (Voyenka)
