= Bezdany raid =

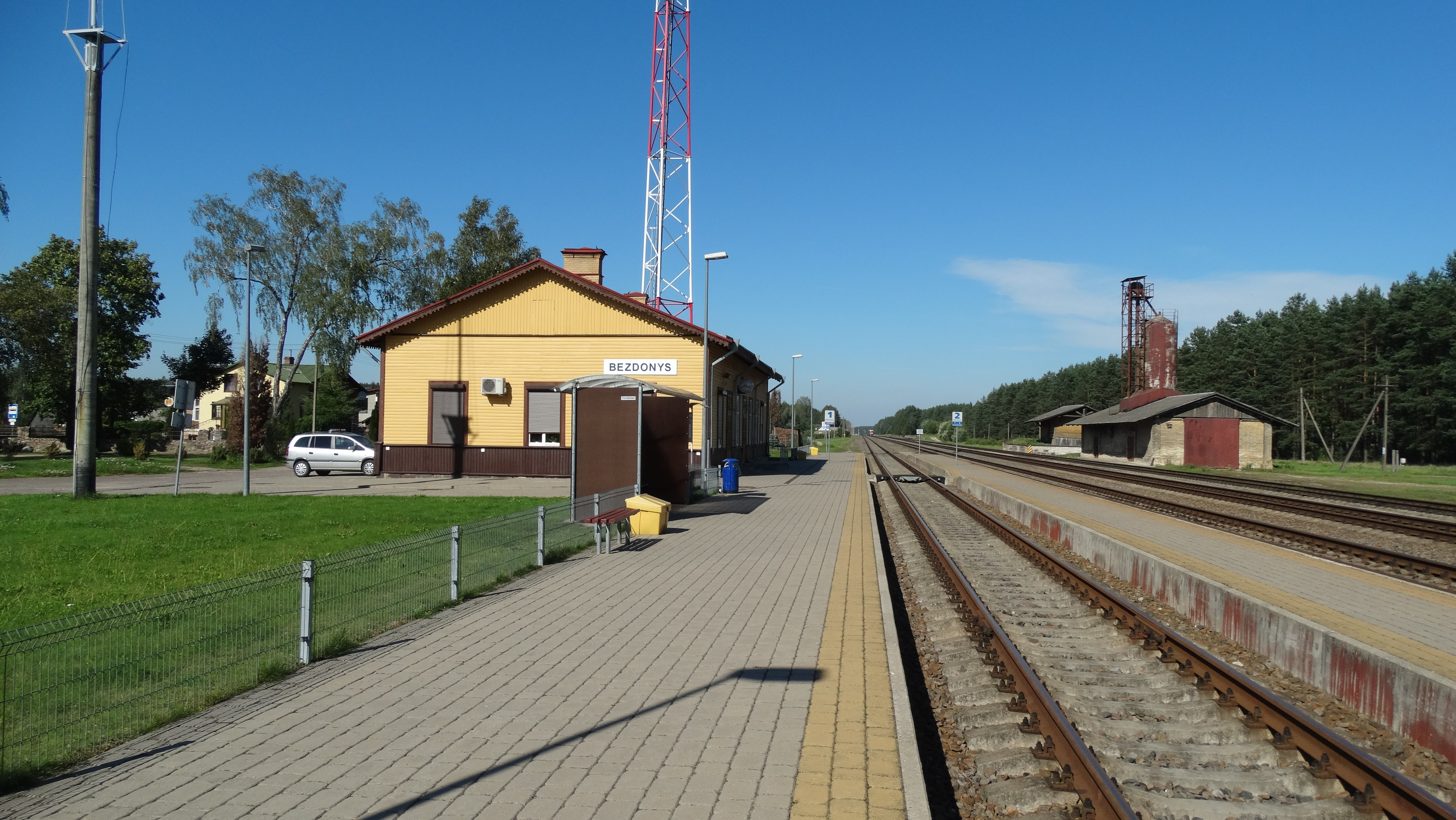
- Site of the Bezdany raid
- Native name: Akcja pod Bezdanami
- Date: September 26–27, 1908
- Location: Bezdany, Vilna Governorate
- Type: Train robbery
- Motive: Extortion
- Organised by: Combat Organization of the Polish Socialist Party
- Participants: Tomasz Arciszewski; Jan Balaga; Bertold Brajtenbach; Aleksander Damasty; Jan Fijałkowski; Edward Gibalski; Bronisław Gorgol; Aleksandra Hellman; Włodzimierz Hellmann; Józef Kobiałko; Cezaryna Kozakiewiczówna; Aleksander Lutze-Birk; Kazimierz Młynarski; Włodzimierz Momentowicz; Józef Piłsudski; Aleksander Prystor; Janina Prystorowa; Jerzy Sawicki; Walery Sławek; Aleksandra Szczerbińska; Czesław Świrski
- Outcome: Theft of ₽200,000
- Deaths: 1 Russian soldier
- Injuries: 5 Russian soldiers

The Bezdany raid was a train robbery carried out on the night of 26/27 September 1908 (Note: Note that some sources give April as the date of the raid. The September date seems to be more popular and better referenced (Zamoyski, Souvarine, Malinowski). The April date probably refers to some other train robbery by Bojówki.) in the vicinity of Bezdany (since 1946 Bezdonys) near Vilnius on a Russian Empire passenger and mail train by a group of the Combat Organization of the Polish Socialist Party led by Józef Piłsudski.

== Background ==
Piłsudski expected that only a conflict between the powers who partitioned Poland in the late 18th century could restore Poland as a country; he also viewed the Russian Empire as the worst of Poland's occupiers. Therefore, he decided to temporarily support the Central Powers (the Austro-Hungarian and German Empires).

In 1906 Piłsudski, with the knowledge and support of the Austrian authorities, founded a military school in Kraków for the training of Bojówki (Combat Teams), a military arm of the Polish Socialist Party (or, specifically, its Revolutionary Fraction). In 1906 alone, the 750-strong Bojówki, operating in five-man units in the former Congress Poland, killed or wounded some 1,000 Russian officials. Bojówki were certainly not above robbing Russian authorities to obtain funds for their operations, and by 1908 Piłsudski and his organization were desperately short on cash.

Piłsudski expressed his thoughts about this violent action in a last will or obituary that he wrote to a friend before the raid:

I am not going to dictate to you what you shall write about my life and work. I only ask of you not to make me a 'whiner and sentimentalist.' [...] I fight and I am ready to die simply because I cannot bear to live in this latrine which is what our life amounts to [...] Let others play at throwing bouquets to Socialism or Polonism [...] My latest idea, which I have not yet fully developed, is to create in all parties, and most of all our own, an organization of physical force, of brute force. I have already done much towards its fulfillment but not enough to rest on my laurels. So now I am staking everything on this last card [...] I may die in this 'expropriation' and I want to explain [...] Money [...] may the devil take it! I prefer to win it in a fight than to beg for it from the Polish public which has become infantile through being chicken-hearted. I haven't got money and I must have it for the ends I pursue.

== The robbery ==
In September 1908, the Bojówki assaulted a Russian mail train travelling on the Saint Petersburg–Warsaw railway near Vilna (Vilnius). The train was carrying tax revenues from Warsaw to St. Petersburg.

Piłsudski personally led the raid; it was the only one he personally took part in, the rule of the bojowka being that each member must take part in at least one armed attack.

The group that took part in the robbery numbered 20 people – 16 men and 4 women Among the members of the Bojówki who took part in that action was his lover and future wife, Aleksandra, and three future Polish Prime Ministers: Tomasz Arciszewski, Aleksander Prystor and Walery Sławek, and other notable politicians and activists of the Second Polish Republic era, like PSP activists Edward Gibalski (or Franciszek), Jerzy Sawicki, and W. Momentowicz.

The Bojówki group had known about the train for weeks and took that time to familiarize themselves with the area. On 26 September, six of them were on the train as passengers, the rest assembled at the little train station at Bezdany, in the presence of several guards unaware of their intent. When the train stopped at the station, the revolutionaries sprang into action, dividing into two groups: one assaulted the train, the other took control of the train station offices, cutting the telephone and telegraph wires. The Poles had several bombs; at least two were thrown into the carriage with the escort by Gibalski and Balaga. One Russian soldier was killed and five were wounded in the short firefight before the rest surrendered. Piłsudski with others prepared the final dynamite charge which opened the mail car and destroyed the iron boxes within. After the Poles took control of the station and the train, they put the money in bags and escaped. Piłsudski went with the group that carried the heaviest bags and escaped through the nearby river.

== Aftermath ==
The loot from that raid was about 200,000 Russian rubles (under the gold standard, equivalent to approximately 5,000 ounces of gold, worth $100,000 in 1908 or 8 million dollars at the price of gold in 2012), a fortune in contemporary Eastern Europe. (Note: The exact amount looted varies from source to source, usually from 200,000 to 300,000 rubles. Urbankowski in his biography of Piłsudski gives the number of 200,812 roubles. Whatever their differences, all sources agree that it was an extremely large amount.) The money was supposed to cover the costs of building a tram system in Vilnius. Piłsudski used those funds to aid his secret military organization. The raid become known in Eastern Europe as one of the most daring and successful train robberies.
