= Łódź insurrection =

1905 uprising in Russian Poland

- Part of Russian Revolution of 1905
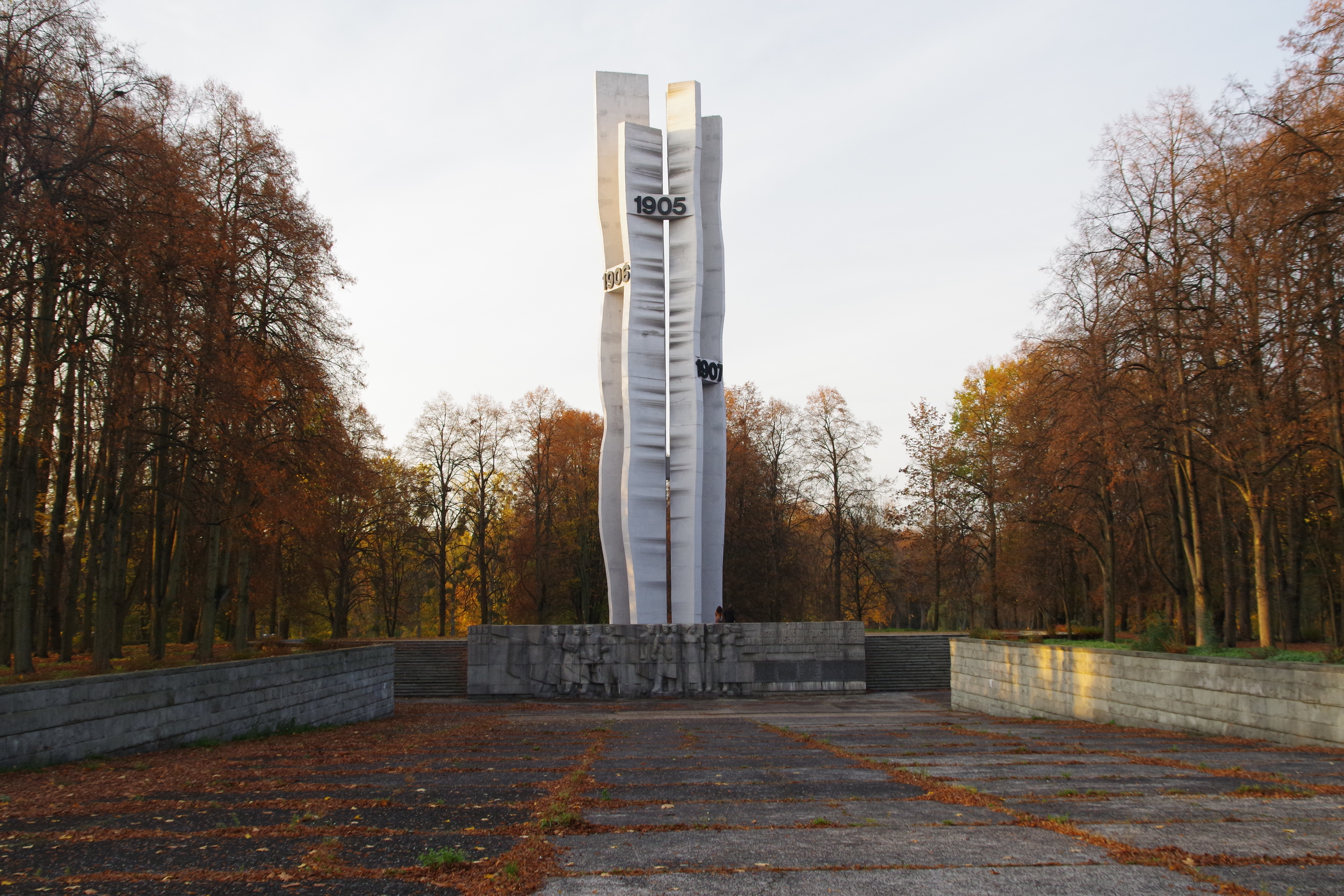
- Łódź monument to the 1905 insurrection
| Date | 21–25 June 1905^{[a]} |
| Location | Łódź, Piotrków Governorate, Congress Poland |
| Result | Russian victory |

Belligerents
| Polish worker militias | (Russia) Russian Empire |

Commanders and leaders
| Unknown | Unknown |

Strength
| Over 3,000 | Six infantry regiments and several cavalry regiments |

Casualties and losses
| 151 (official) – over 200 (unofficial) dead 150 (official) – 2,000 (unofficial) wounded | Unknown |

The Łódź insurrection (Polish: Powstanie łódzkie), also known as the June Days (Polish: Powstanie czerwcowe), was an uprising by Polish workers in Łódź against the Russian Empire between 21 and 25 June 1905. (Note: Sources are not in universal agreement as to when the insurrection started and ended. Many sources give dates of 22–24 June; however, according to some sources, the police and military were attacked as early as 21 June, and the final barricade fell on 25 June.) This event was one of the largest disturbances in the Russian-controlled Congress Poland during the Russian Revolution of 1905. Poland was a major center of revolutionary fighting in the Russian Empire in 1905–1907, and the Łódź insurrection was a key incident in those events.

For months, workers in Łódź had been in a state of unrest, with several major strikes having taken place, which were forcibly suppressed by the Russian police and military. The insurrection began spontaneously, without backing from any organized group. Polish revolutionary groups were taken by surprise and did not play a major role in the subsequent events. Around 21–22 June, following clashes with the authorities in the previous days, angry workers began building barricades and assaulting police and military patrols. Additional troops were called by the authorities, who also declared martial law. On 23 June, no businesses operated in the city, as the police and military stormed dozens of workers' barricades. Eventually, by 25 June, the uprising was crushed, with estimates of several hundred dead and wounded. The uprising was reported in the international press and widely discussed by socialist and communist activists worldwide. Unrest in Łódź would continue for many months, although without protests on such a large-scale as before.

== Background ==
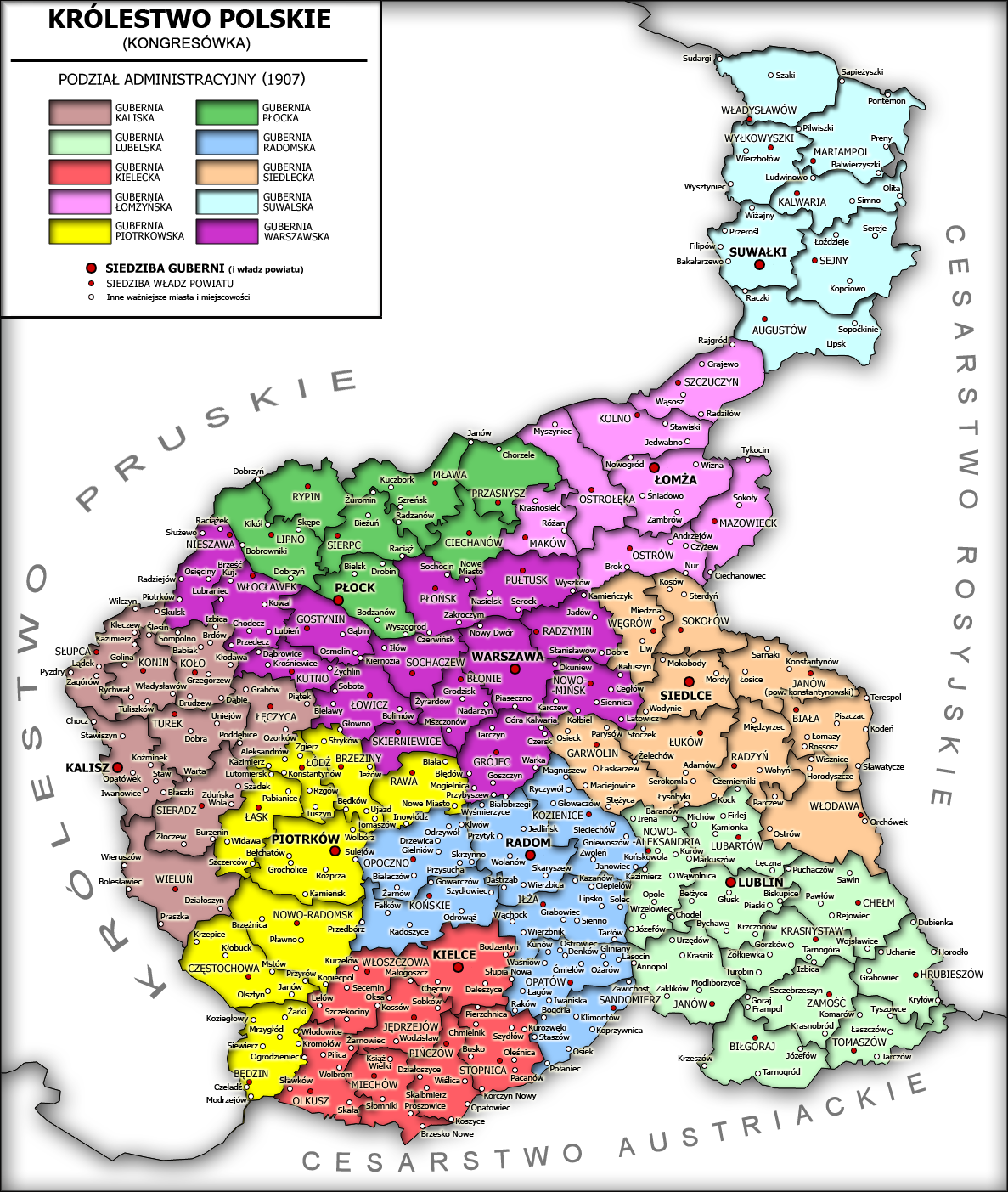
Kingdom of Poland, administrative divisions in 1907. Łódź was in the northern part of the Piotrków Governorate (in yellow)

At the beginning of the 20th century, worsening economic conditions contributed to mounting tensions in Russia and Poland: the Russo-Japanese War had damaged the economy of the Kingdom of Poland, and by late 1904, over 100,000 Polish workers had lost their jobs. In the late 19th and early 20th centuries, Łódź had been a major Polish industrial center, heavily urbanized and industrialized, and its large working class made it an important stronghold of the Polish socialist movement. News of the 1905 Russian Revolution, together with its revolutionary spirit, spread quickly into Russian-controlled Poland from Saint Petersburg, where demonstrators had been massacred on 22 January. Poland was a major center of revolutionary fighting in the Russian Empire in 1905–1907, and the Łódź insurrection was a key incident in those events. Workers in Łódź had already begun striking sometime before 22 January, and by 31 January the tsarist police were reporting demonstrators carrying placards with slogans such as "Down with the autocracy! Down with the war!". This was capitalized on by factions in Russia and Poland that wanted more or less radical changes. Soon over 400,000 workers became involved in strikes in Poland.

The wing of the Polish Socialist Party (Polska Partia Socjalistyczna, PPS) that was loyal to Józef Piłsudski believed that Poles should show their determination to regain independence through active, violent protests against the Russians. This view was not shared by Roman Dmowski's National Democratic Party (ND, Polish: endecja) nor by the PPS's own "Left" (or "Young") wing. The National Democrats favored cooperation with the Russian authorities, while the PPS Left wanted to work together with Russian revolutionaries to topple the tsardom and saw the creation of a socialist utopia as more important than Polish independence.

The Russo-Japanese War had caused rising dissent throughout the Russian Empire, including its Polish provinces. On 26 January 1905 about 6,000 workers in Łódź took part in a large strike. Next day, a general strike was declared, and the day after that, 70,000 workers were on strike. They demanded an 8-hour work day and support for the sick. Some worker demonstrations were joined by the students, who demanded an end to the policy of Russification. Another large strike occurred during the Labor Day on 1 May. It affected close to half of the city's industry. On 3 May, the anniversary of the Polish May Constitution, another demonstration with patriotic undertones took place. On 30 May, Łódź's industrialists asked the Russian governor-general for help.

The murder of the worker Jerzy Grabczyński by Russian Cossack cavalry at the Grohmana is mentioned as one of the sparks of the insurrection. On 18 June 1905, Russian police opened fire on one of the many workers' demonstrations in Łódź, killing approximately ten workers, whose funerals, attended by over 50,000–70,000 people, escalated into major demonstrations on 20 and 21 June. The funeral on 21 June was met by Cossack cavalry again; the crowd threw stones, and the Russian cavalry returned fire, killing 25 people and wounding hundreds. Social Democracy of the Kingdom of Poland and Lithuania (SDKPiL) called for a general strike on 23 June.

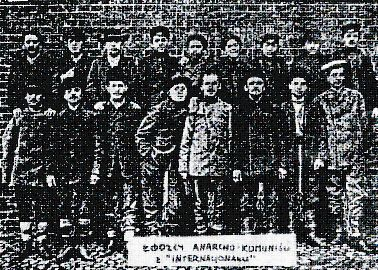
Members of an Anarchist communist group in Łódź in 1906.

Piłsudski's PPS, while not planning for a major uprising then and there, had a policy of supporting the protest and harassing Russian forces. The PPS, as well as other socialist organizations, such as Jewish Bund and SDKPiL, were as surprised by the scale of the spontaneous revolt as the Russian authorities; PPS forces in Łódź consisted of 10 regular and armed PPS members and a few dozen semi-enlisted workers. A larger group sent from Warsaw under Walery Sławek never made it in time to take control or affect the uprising; it was, in the end, an anarchic and unorganized violent protest against the Russian government.

== Uprising ==
Tensions mounted further, and in the evening of 21 or 22 June (sources vary), angry workers began building barricades and assaulting police and military patrols, killing those who did not surrender. About a hundred barricades were constructed over the course of the next few days.

Around Wschodnia Street, workers opened fire on a company of soldiers and cavalry, and on Południowa street, a unit of gendarmes was surrounded. Several fires begun in the town, as workers set liquor stores on fire, and the government forces assaulted the first barricades, initially without much success. The tsarist representatives called from reinforcements, which came from Częstochowa, Warsaw, and summer training camps. Several infantry regiments entered the city. Eventually, Russian forces sent to suppress the workers numbered six infantry regiments and several cavalry regiments. Despite that, the situation was spiralling into a full blown uprising. On 23 June, all industries, workshops, shops and offices were closed, as the workers and government forces clashed.

Some of the heaviest fighting took place near the intersection of Wschodnia and Południowa (now Rewolucji 1905 r.) streets (where four barricades were located), near the Scheibler factory in the Źródliska park and on the Rokociny road (al. Piłsudskiego). The Rokociny area was manned by a 3,000-strong worker militia, which eventually was forced to retreat to the Źródliska park. The insurgents had no organized agenda, and commonly fought under red standards; common demands were the improvement of workers' living conditions and greater rights for the Polish population. On 23 June (or as late as 26 June – sources vary) the Tsar signed a decree of martial law in the city.

The PPS-supported worker factions found themselves facing not only Russian police and regular troops, but endecja militia. Armed clashes broke out between gunmen loyal to Piłsudski's PPS and those loyal to Dmowski. Over the course of the "June Days", as the Łódź uprising became known in Poland, a miniature civil war raged between Piłsudski's PPS and Dmowski's endeks.

The insurgents were poorly armed, and eventually were overwhelmed by the tsarist regular military. Most of the barricades fell by 24 June; the last of the barricades (in the Źródliska park and Wschodnia street) were captured by Russian troops by the end of 24 June or by midday on 25 June (sources vary), but unrest—including occasional shots at police or military patrols—would continue for days afterwards.

== Aftermath ==
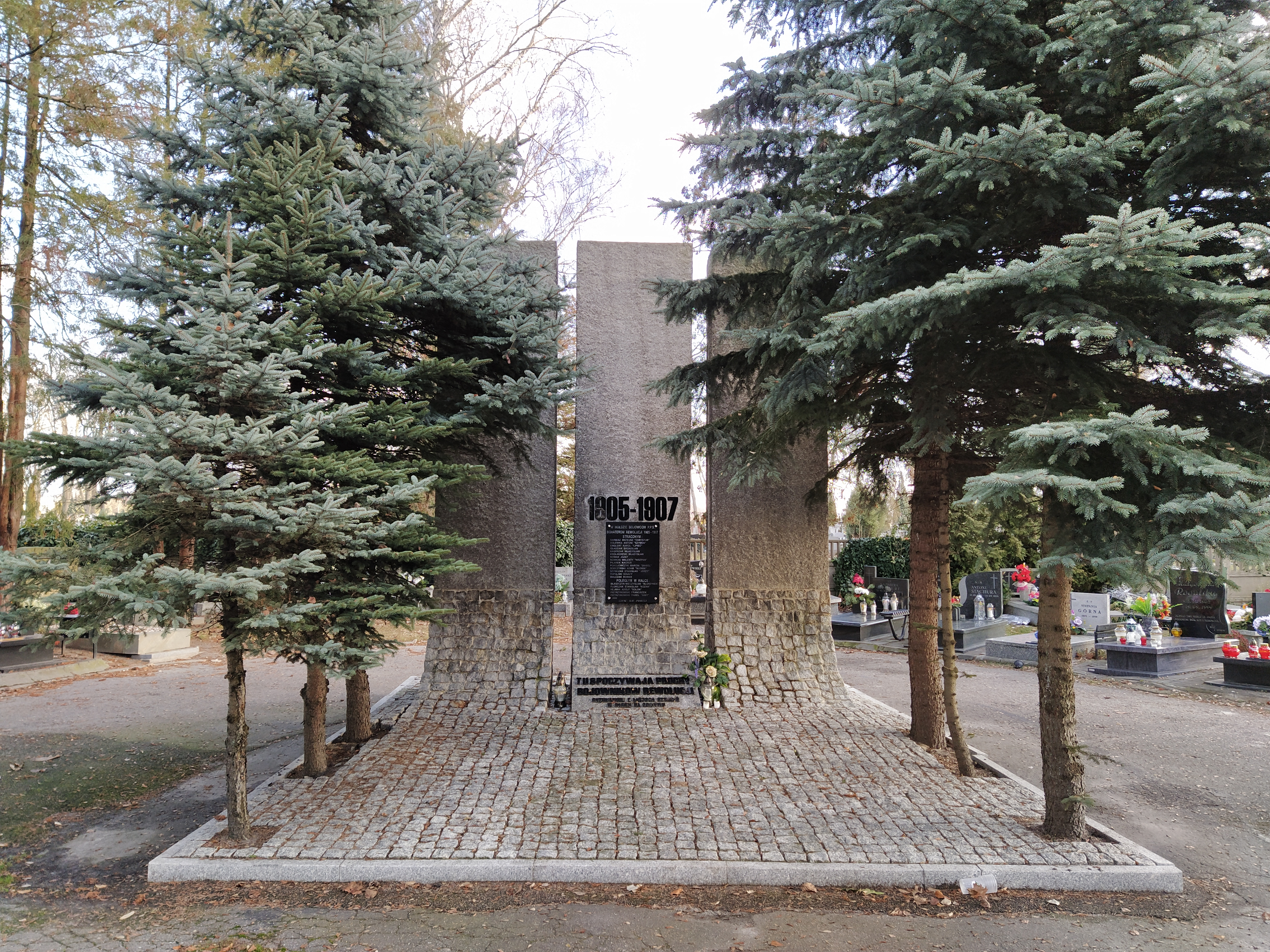
Monument to the PPS fighters who died in the fighting in the years 1905–1907 at the Doły Cemetery in Łódź

The uprising was ultimately crushed by the Russian authorities. Official reports indicated 151 civilian deaths (55 Poles, 79 Jews and 17 Germans) and 150 wounded; unofficial reports spoke of over 200 fatalities and between 800 and as many as 2,000 wounded.

The Łódź uprising was neither the first nor the last disturbance in what has been described in Polish historiography as the revolution in the Kingdom of Poland (1905–1907)—various protests and strikes occurred in major Polish cities under Russian control throughout the year—but it would be the most dramatic one. In September 1905, two PPS activists would assassinate Juliusz Karol Kunitzer, owner of the Heinzel & Kunitzer factory, known for his poor treatment of workers. Strikes in Łódź continued until mid-1906, when the large Russian military presence and mass layoffs of striking workers from the factories finally pacified the city. Even afterward, Łódź was not a peaceful city; in the years 1910–1914 it was the site of a radical, anarchist and socialist group Rewolucyjni Mściciele labeled as "the most extreme, terrorist group in the history of Poland".

The uprising was reported in the international press and recognized by socialist and communist activists worldwide.
