= Anti-communist resistance in Poland =

Anti-communist resistance in Poland may refer to:

- Anti-communist resistance in Poland (1944–1953), armed partisan struggle
- Anti-communist resistance in Poland (1944–1989), armed partisan struggle and the non-violent, civil resistance struggle
