= Georgi Skalon =

Russian general

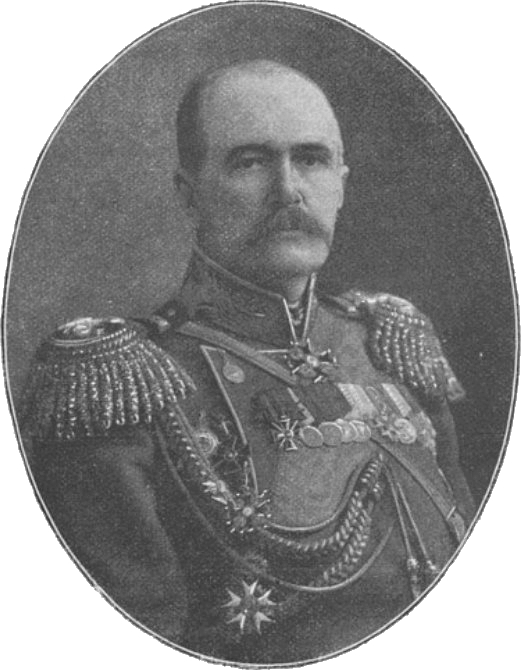
Georg Karl de Scalon in 1905

Georg Karl de Scallon (Polish: Gieorgij Antonowicz Skałon, Russian: Гео́ргий Анто́нович Скало́н, tr. Geórgiy Antónovich Skalón; 24 October 1847 – 1 February 1914) was a Russian general of Huguenot origin, Governor-general of Warsaw and the commander-in-chief of the Warsaw Military District from 1905 to 1914.

In 1903 he became the general-aide of the court of the Tsar Nicholas II. In 1905 was promoted to a general of cavalry as well as the general-governor of Warsaw. During the Russian Revolution of 1905 he introduced a martial law (on 10 November) and gave orders that led to brutal dispersion of crowds protesting in several Polish cities, with many fatalities among the civilian demonstrators. For that, the Polish Socialist Party decided to assassinate him. On 18 August 1906 Organizacja Bojowa PPS tried to kill him with two bombs thrown at his carriage (by Wanda Krahelska), but he survived. In 1912, a sudden test of troop mobilization capabilities was carried out in the Warsaw Military District and elsewhere throughout the empire.

In 1882 Scallon married Baroness Marie von Korff. She was daughter of the Colonel of the Imperial Russian Cuirassier Regiment, Baron Joseph Kasimir Alexander von Korff (1829–1873) and Anna Myasnikova. Granddaughter of the General of the Artillery, Baron Nikolaus Johann Rudolf von Korff (1793–1869).

He was awarded Order of Prince Danilo I and a number of other decorations.

== In popular culture ==
- The Thaumaturge (2024), an isometric role-playing game developed by Polish game studio Fool's Theory and published by 11 Bit Studios. Georgi Skalon is an antagonist in the game, which is set in 1905 Warsaw. He is voice-acted by Zbigniew Konopka.
