= Polish Socialist Party – Revolutionary Faction =

Polish Socialist Party – Revolutionary Faction Polska Partja Socjalistyczna – Frakcja Rewolucyjna
- Abbreviation: PPS–FR
- Leader: Józef Piłsudski
- Founded: 1906
- Split from: PPS
- Succeeded by: PPS in 1909
- Newspaper: Robotnik
- Youth wing: Riflemen's Association
- Ideology: Polish nationalism Socialism; Left-wing nationalism Revolutionary nationalism
- Political position: Left-wing
- Colours: Red
- Anthem: The Standard of Revolt

The Polish Socialist Party – Revolutionary Faction (Polish: Polska Partia Socjalistyczna – Frakcja Rewolucyjna, PPS–FR) also known as the Old Faction (Polish: Starzy) was one of two factions into which the Polish Socialist Party split in 1906. The Revolutionary Faction's primary goal was to restore an independent Poland, which was envisioned as a socialist democratic republic. It saw itself as a spiritual successor to the Red Faction of the 1863 January Uprising, which had the goal of creating an independent Polish-Lithuanian-Ruthenian Commonwealth.

== History ==
=== Split in the Polish Socialist Party ===
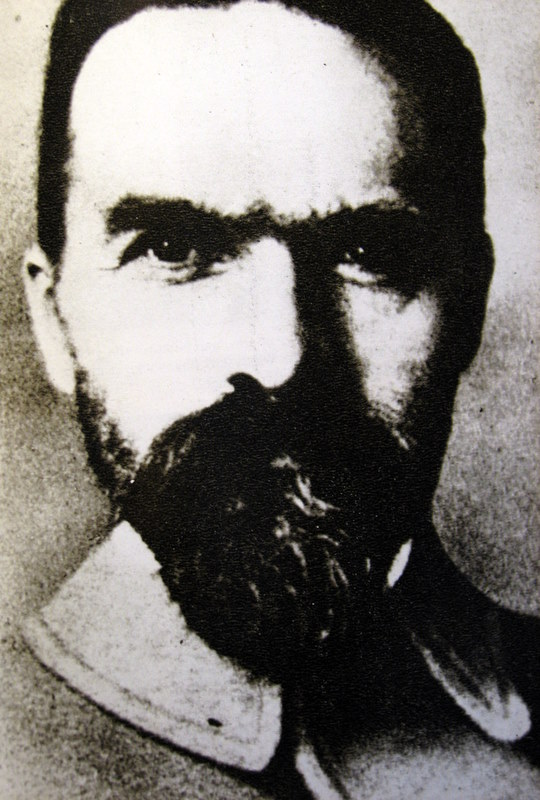
Leader of the Revolutionary Faction, Józef Piłsudski

For several years, the Polish Socialist Party (PPS) faced an internal conflict. Initially founded as a nationalist, pro-independence movement, the PPS, under the leadership of Piłsudski, took steps to establish a Polish army to fight the Russian occupiers. In pursuit of this goal, Piłsudski established the Combat Organization of the PPS, which played a significant role during the 1905 unrests in Russia. The organization gained considerable influence, collaborating with the Japanese Empire, receiving financial support in exchange for intelligence and attacks on Russian officials. While Piłsudski focused on preparing for a future Polish army, a more internationalist, Marxist-leaning faction within the PPS grew concerned about his rising popularity and the influence of the Combat Organization.

This internal division eventually led to a split within the party. The internationalist, far-left members formed the Polish Socialist Party – Left (PPS-L or the Young Faction), advocating for Poland to become a Marxist state, achieved through a proletarian revolution and integration into the global communist movement, alongside the Russian proletariat. This vision, which rejected the idea of an independent Polish state, was considered treasonous by the opposing faction. In 1906, Piłsudski and his supporters broke away to create the Revolutionary Faction of the PPS, which sought to restore the Polish Commonwealth, with the primary goal of raising funds to establish a Polish army.

=== Activism ===
With the Combat Organization of the Polish Socialist Party and the conspiratory Związek Walki Czynnej, the party continually worked to build the basis for a future Polish army.

It organized several raids and assassinations of Tsarist officials in the Russian partition, most prominent the Bezdany raid, which became the last action of the PPS–FR in the Russian partition. After that last raid, Piłsudski and his followers left the Russian Empire and moved to Galicia-Lodomeria (Austrian Poland), where there was a relative freedom. In the Austrian partition, Piłsudski was able to organize several paramilitary organisations under the guise of being rifle-clubs, which would be the basis for the Polish Legions in 1914.

Thus the leadership of the PPS–FR would become some of the most prominent fathers of Polish independence, with many of them serving as Prime Ministers, famously Aleksander Prystor and Walery Sławek, two as Presidents (Wojciechowski, Mościcki) and several ministers.

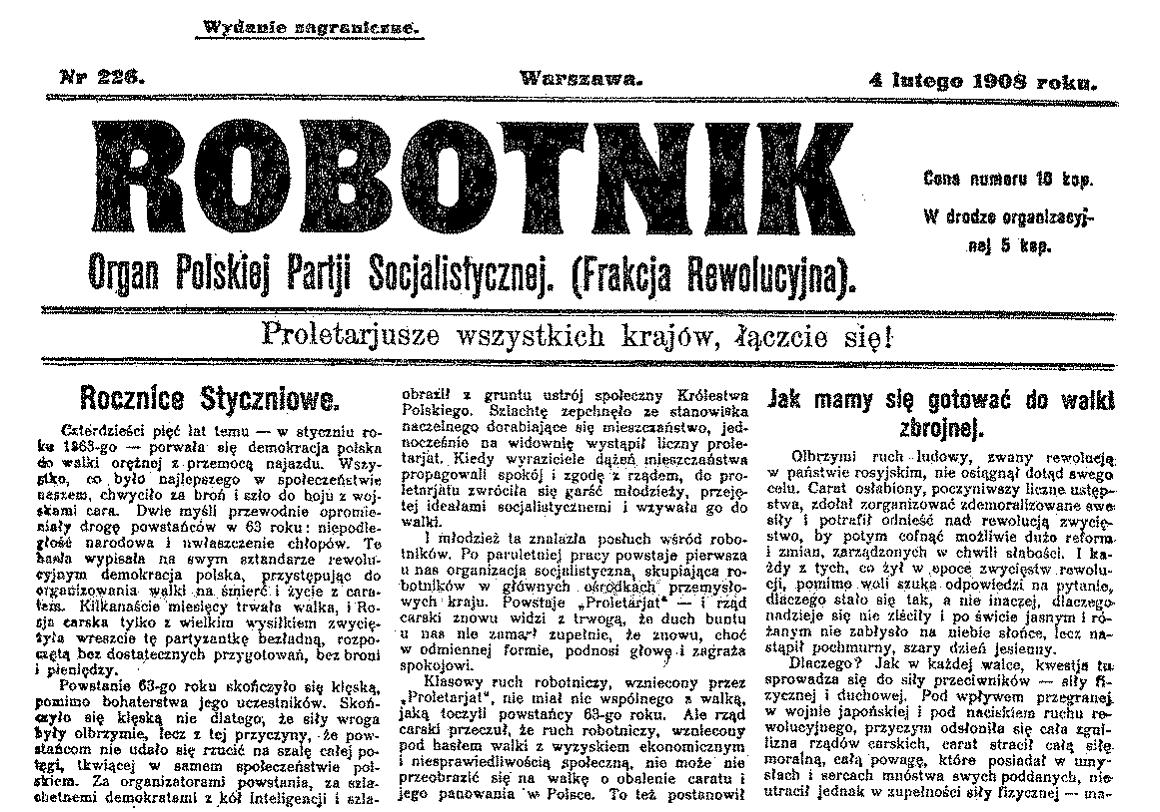
Newspaper of the Revolutionary Faction "Robotnik," celebrating the anniversary of the January Uprising (1863)

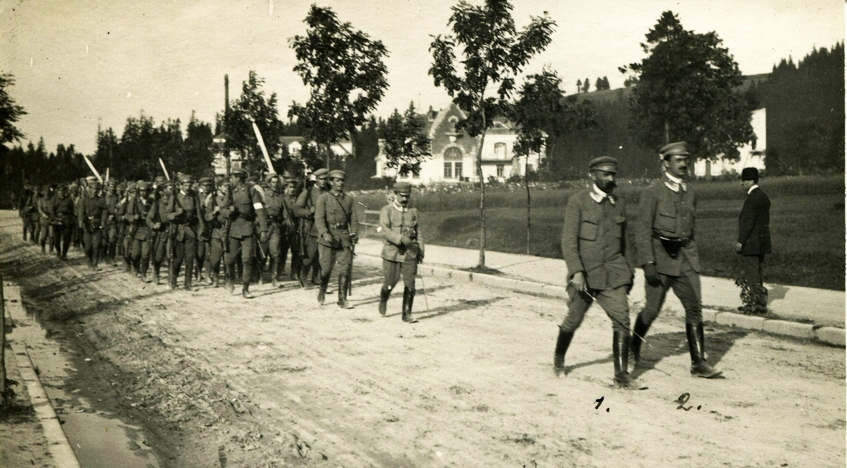
The Riflemen's Association exercising in Zakopane

=== Later History ===
With the failure of revolution in the Kingdom of Poland (1905-1907) PPS–Left lost popularity, and PPS–FR regained dominance. In 1909 PPS–FR renamed itself back to Polska Partia Socjalistyczna (Polish Socialist Party); the increasingly marginal PPS–L merged with Social Democracy of the Kingdom of Poland and Lithuania, led by Róża Luksemburg in 1918 to form the Communist Party of Poland.

In independent Poland, in 1928, the PPS split once more. While the PPS had supported Piłsudski during the May Coup in 1926, they disagreed afterward whether to support his Sanation movement. When the PPS decided to go into opposition, a faction of Piłsudski's supporters in the PPS split off and created the Polish Socialist Party – old Revolutionary Faction.

== Notable Members ==
Józef Piłsudski, Walery Sławek, Aleksander Prystor, Ignacy Daszyński, Kazimierz Pużak, Tomasz Arciszewski, Rajmund Jaworowski, Leon Wasilewski, Mieczysław Niedziałkowski, Norbert Barlicki, and Jędrzej Moraczewski.

== See also ==
- Polish legions in WWI
- Riflemen's Association
- Związek Walki Czynnej
