= Revolution in the Kingdom of Poland =

20th-century insurrection in Poland

Revolution in the Kingdom of Poland in 1905–1907
- Part of the Russian Revolution of 1905
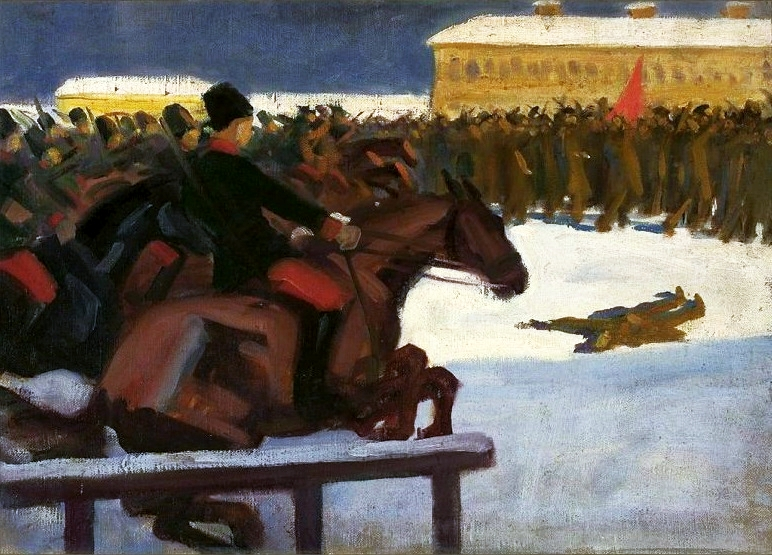
- Street demonstration in 1905
Date	1905–1907
Location	Russia, Congress Poland (Vistula Land)
Result	Imperial Government victory

Belligerents
(Russia) Russian Imperial Government; Russian Army; Okhrana; Polish reactionaries; National-Democratic Party; Stronnictwo Polityki Realnej (Real Politics Party)	Polish revolutionaries; Worker militias; Polish Socialist Party; Combat Organization; SDKPiL; Bund; Anarchists

Commanders and leaders
Nicholas II (Russian Empire) Sergei Witte (Russian Empire) Georgi Skalon; Roman Dmowski	Józef Piłsudski

Strength
~150,000 troops stationed in Poland	~20,000 armed insurgents

Casualties and losses
More than 200 killed 450–600 injured	3,000 approximately killed 2,000 approximately injured

A major part of the Russian Revolution of 1905 took place in the Russian Partition of Poland and lasted until 1907 (see Congress Poland and Privislinsky Krai). It was the largest wave of strikes and widest emancipatory movement that Poland had ever seen until the 1970s and the 1980s. One of the major events of that period was the insurrection in Łódź in June 1905. Throughout that period, many smaller demonstrations and armed struggles between the peasants and workers on one side and the government on the other took place. The demands of the demonstrators included the improvement of the workers' living conditions, as well as political freedoms, particularly related to increased autonomy for Poland. Particularly in 1905, Poland was at the verge of a new uprising, revolution or civil war. Some Polish historians even consider the events of that period a fourth Polish uprising against the Russian Empire.

== Background ==
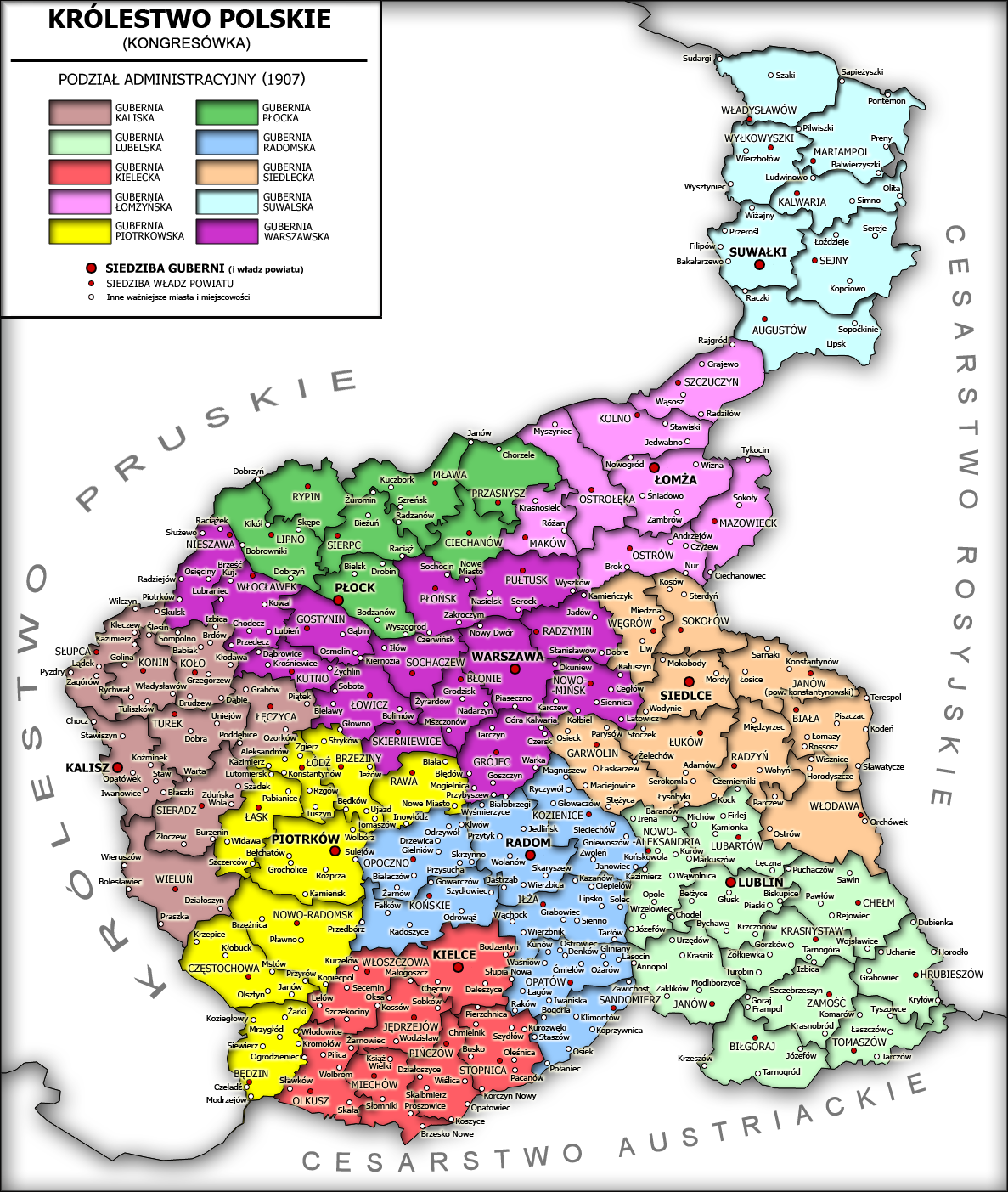
Kingdom of Poland, administrative divisions in 1907

Worsening economic conditions (the recession of 1901-1903) contributed to mounting political tensions in the Russian Empire, including Poland; the economy of the Kingdom of Poland was also being significantly hit by the aftershocks of the Russo-Japanese War; by late 1904 over 100,000 Polish workers had lost their jobs. Conscriptions to the Russian army, and ongoing russification policies further aggravated the Polish population. News and attitudes of the 1905 Russian Revolution quickly spread from Saint Petersburg (where demonstrators were massacred on January 22) across the Russian Empire and into Russian-controlled Poland. This was capitalized on by factions in Russia and Poland that wanted more or less radical changes.

In the meantime, two factions among the Polish political leaders clashed. The wing of the Polish Socialist Party (Polska Partia Socjalistyczna, PPS) that was loyal to Józef Piłsudski believed that Poles must show their determination to regain independence through active, violent protests against the Russians. This view was not shared by Roman Dmowski's National Democratic Party (endecja) nor by the PPS' own "Left" (or "Young") wing. The National Democrats believed that the Poles should work together with the Russian authorities and increase their representation in the Duma (Russian parliament), while the PPS Left wanted to work together with Russian revolutionaries to topple the Tsar and saw the creation of a socialist society as more important than Polish independence.

== Revolution ==
During the 19th century, Łódź had become a major Polish industrial centre. Heavily urbanized and industrialized, it was a stronghold of the socialist movement. By January 22, 1905, workers in Łódź had been strike, and on January 31, tsarist police reported that the strikers carried placards with the slogans "Down with the autocracy! Down with the war!". Similarly in Warsaw, the former capital of Poland and another major industrial centre, uprisings and demonstrations were common. There was a general strike in Warsaw on January 14 and over 90 fatalities in the city over the next few days. On January 17, the Russian government declared that Warsaw was under a state of siege.

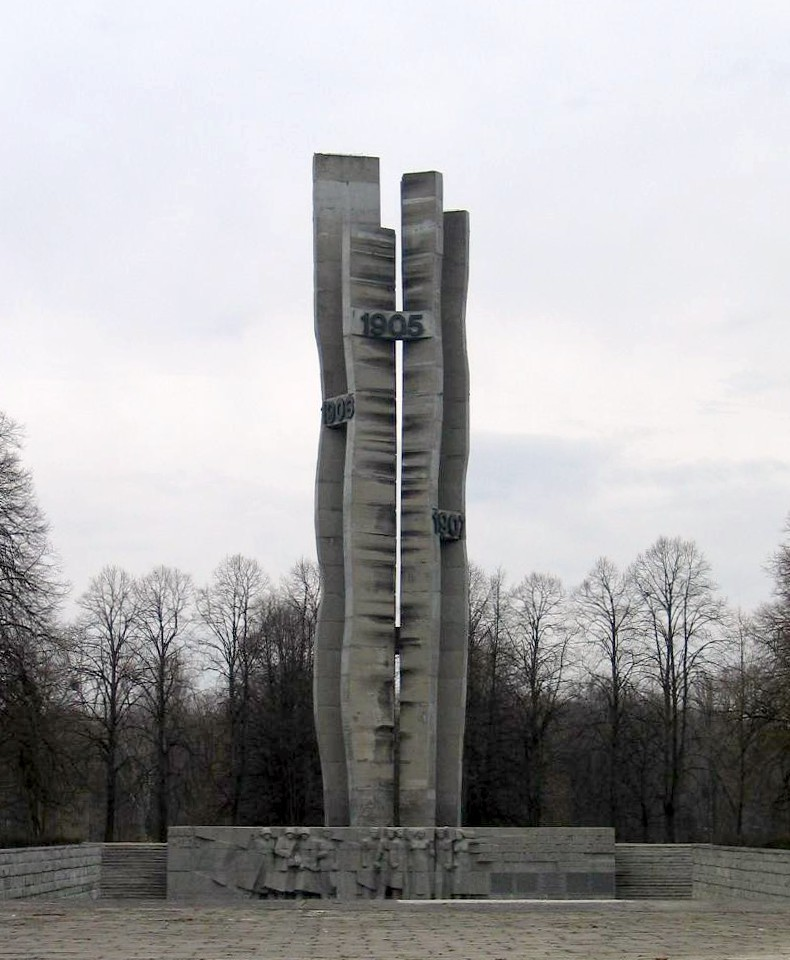
Łódź monument to the 1905 insurrection

On 28 January, the PPS and the Social Democracy of the Kingdom of Poland and Lithuania called for a general strike. Over 400,000 workers became involved in strikes all over Poland that lasted for four weeks. That was only a prelude to an even larger series of strikes that rocked Poland over next year. In 1905 to 1906, close to 7,000 strikes and other work stoppages occurred, involving 1.3 million Poles. Protesters demanded improved conditions for workers and more political freedom for the Poles. By February, students at Polish universities had joined the demonstrations to protest Russification and demand the right to study in the Polish language. They were joined by high school pupils and even some from the elementary schools. The Russian government gave in and agreed to some concessions towards the Polish nationalist movement by removing some restrictions on the use of Polish in the classrooms, many, particularly the workers, were still dissatisfied. In some places in Poland, the school strikes lasted for nearly three years. Major demonstrations occurred on May 1 (Labour Day), and about 30 people were shot during a demonstration in Warsaw. Later that month, public order disintegrated in Warsaw for a time during a spontaneous campaign against both the criminal elements and the Russian collaborators.

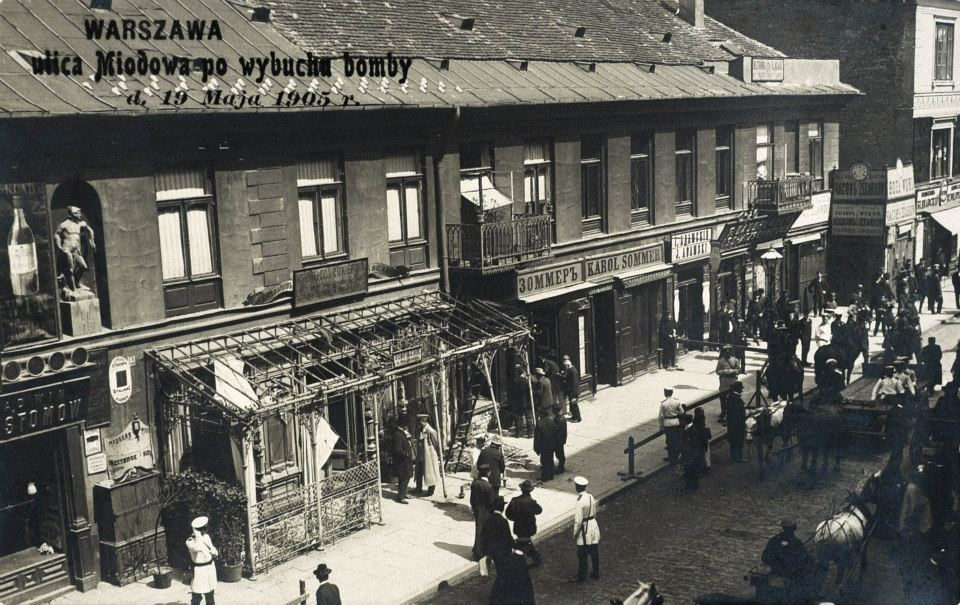
Miodowa Street in Warsaw, 1905, just after a PPS bomb explosion.

In mid-June 1905, Russian police opened fire on one of many workers' demonstrations in Łódź. The resulting Łódź insurrection saw several days of fighting within the cities and over 2000 casualties, including over 100 fatalities among the civilians. Several protests and strikes occurred in major Polish cities under Russian control throughout the year, but as the Polish journalist Włodzimierz Kalicki wrote, the Łódź insurrection was the most dramatic one. The Russian government contributed to the chaos by trying to incite some anti-Jewish pogroms. Another notable occurrence was the establishment of the Zagłębie Republic (Republika Zagłębiowska), a Polish socialist statelet centred around the region of Zagłębie Dąbrowskie that existed from October to November 1905. A similar socialist state of the Ostrowiec Republic (Republika Ostrowiecka) around the city of Ostrowiec Świętokrzyski existed from late December 1905 to mid-January 1906.

In August 1906, revolutionaries near Warsaw shot the chief of the gendarmerie.

In June 1907, shootings and violence arose again in Łódź. A mill manager was murdered, and a tannery director was also mortally wounded. Local socialist organizations even declared that there had been no reason to target that particular mill manager. A vigilante group also carried out executions during this time, leaving corpses in the street for officers to find the next day. Fifteen people were killed over a few weeks, with thirty wounded.

In August 1907 in Łódź, at least 30 men were killed during another disruptive strike, and shops were forced to close. The power plant for an electric traction system in the city was also shut down, and streetcars were turned into barricades.

== Aftermath ==
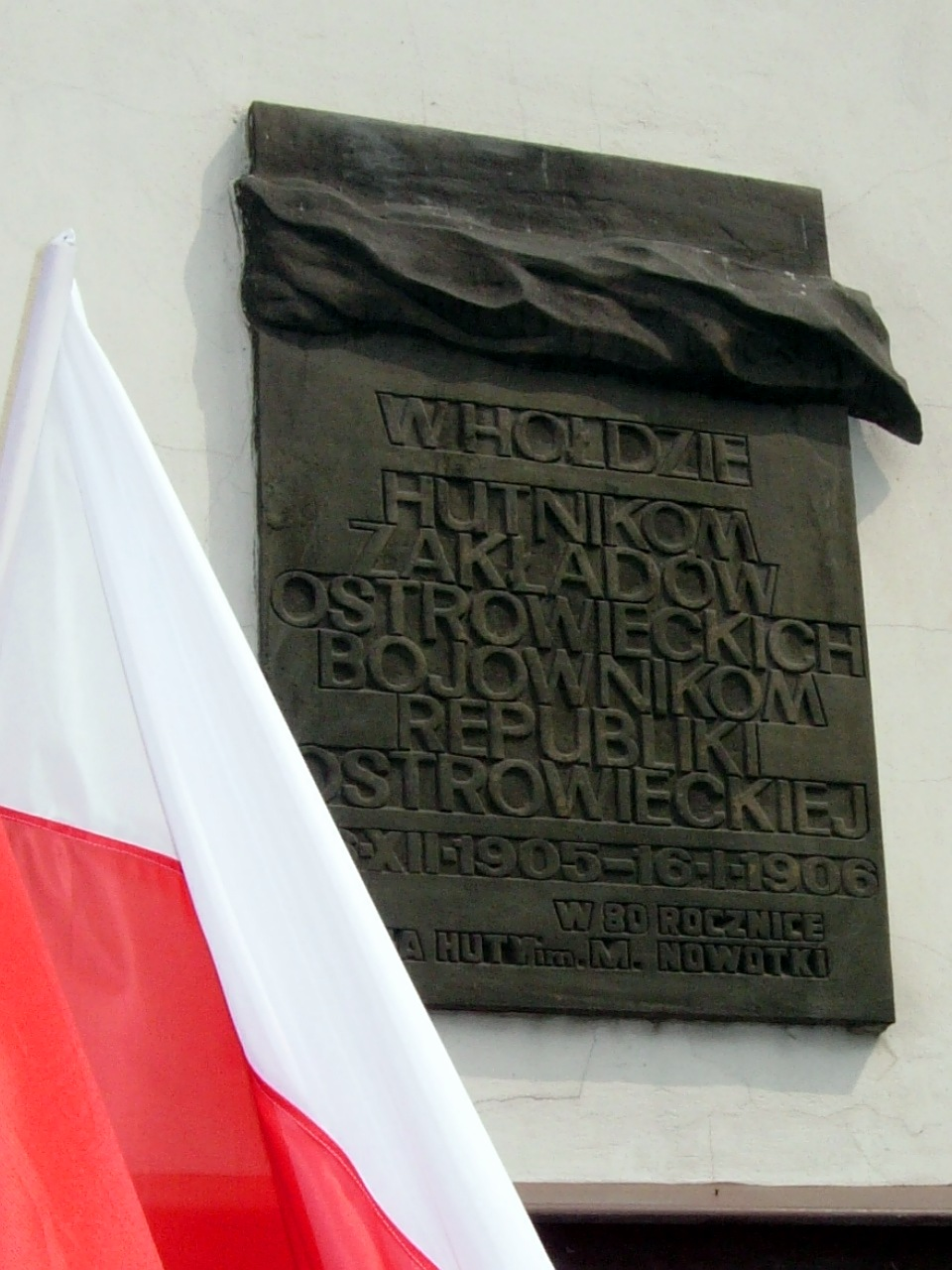
Memorial tablet in Ostrowiec Świętokrzyski to the 1905–1906 Ostrowiec Republic

Most of the unrest occurred in 1905, but until 1906-1907, worker unrest, demonstrations and occasional armed clashes continued to occur in Poland. Strikes in Łódź continued until mid-1907, when only the large Russian military presence and mass layoffs of striking workers from the factories pacified the city. The unrest in Poland forced the Russians to keep an army of 250,000-300,000 soldiers there, an army even larger than the one fighting the Japanese in the east.

In early 1907, the Financial Times indicated that the "labour disturbances in Poland were handicapping trade." Mill owners were still anxious about the "labor question," and new investments in mill equipment were poorly justified. The Financial Times also reported that building and iron trades were reduced to "stagnation." Higher costs of manufacturing in Poland were also pushing some business to the Far East and Siberia. In 1908, trade and industry in Poland were beginning a slow recovery after the years of strikes and disorder. The Financial Times reported that the iron industry had been most severely impacted.

Piłsudski's Combat Organization of the Polish Socialist Party, founded in 1904, contributed to some escalation of the hostilities and became more active during the over few years. It started its campaign of assassinations and robberies mostly from 1906, but it grew much less active towards the end of the decade. Piłsudski's faction was temporarily weakened, and the PPS split; however, by 1909, Piłsudski's faction had again regained prominence on the Polish underground political scene. Piłsudski eventually succeeded in securing Polish independence and became an important political figure in interwar Poland.

Another consequence was the evolution of Polish political parties and thought. National consciousness had risen among the Polish peasants. Despite the failure to achieve the most radical goals of the revolution, the Russian government conceded some of the demands, both in the social and in the political spheres, which counteracted the defeatist feelings among many Poles, who still remembered the total defeat of previous uprisings. In particular, Russification was partially reversed in education in Poland.

== Gallery ==
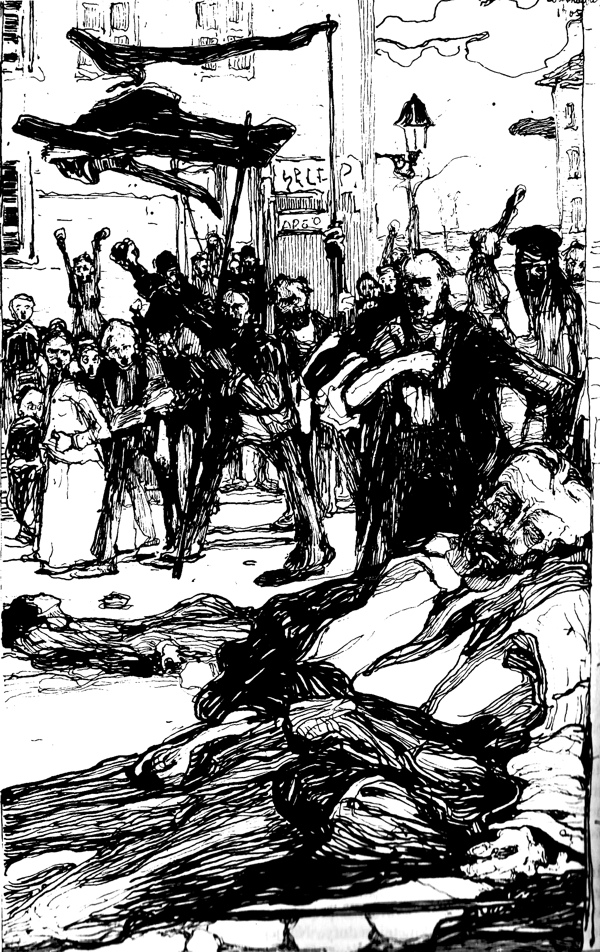
Witold Wojtkiewicz Manifestacja uliczna (Street demonstration)

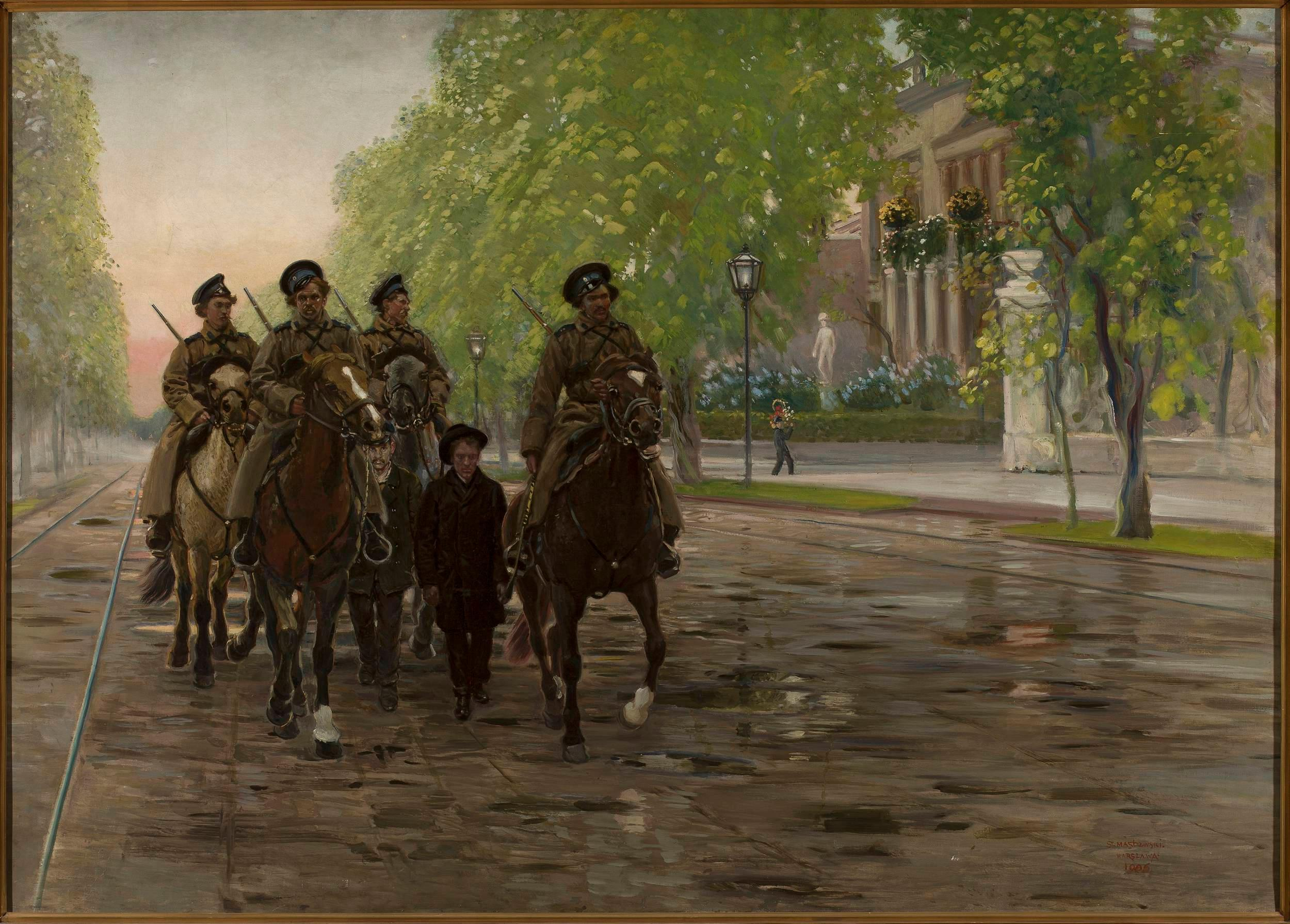
Stanisław Masłowski Wiosna roku 1905 (Spring of year 1905). Cossack patrol escorting teenage insurrectionists.

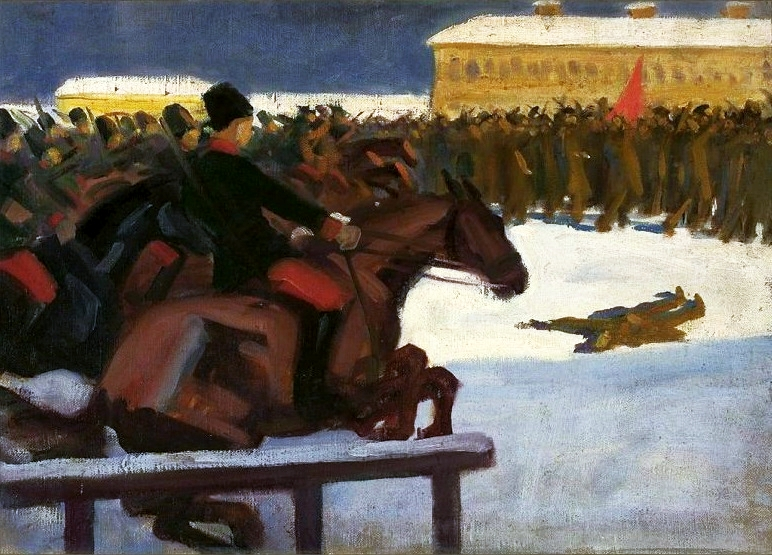
Władysław Skoczylas, Demonstracja uliczna w 1905 (Street demonstration in 1905)

== See also ==
- Bloody Wednesday (Poland)
- Warszawianka (1905)
