= Propaganda in the Polish People's Republic =

A post-WWII Polish communist propaganda poster showing a giant soldier of the communist Armia Ludowa armed resistance organization striding over a little soldier of the Armia Krajowa (anti-Nazi military organization in reality much larger than the "Armia Ludowa," but loyal to the non-communist Polish government-in-exile), stating: "The Giant and the drooling reactionary dwarf."

Communist propaganda played an important role in the Polish People's Republic, one of the largest and most important satellite states of the Soviet Union following WWII. Together with the use of force and terror it was instrumental in keeping the country's communist government in power and was designed to shape Polish society into a communist one.

Starting from the 1970s, Polish propaganda was significantly altered and then dominated by the form known as "propaganda of success".

== Themes ==
=== Allies ===
==== Polish diaspora ====
PZPR propaganda usually expressed a positive view of Polish Americans and tried to convince them to immigrate back to Poland. The PZPR criticized the Polish diaspora as a whole for not joining the Polish Armed Forces during the 1939 Invasion of Poland.

=== Enemies ===
==== United States ====
The propagandists of the Polish United Workers' Party (PZPR) declared the United States to be the "foremost capitalist" of the capitalist countries and criticized it extensively. According to Wojciech Lipoński, "between 1948 and 1954 one could hardly find a single issue of any daily or weekly paper without an anti-American tirade or at least one political cartoon". The United States, along with the United Kingdom, was shown as the root of all evil in the world, though the United States was held solely responsible for the downfall of the United Kingdom as a major world power.

==== Jews ====
In 1967, the PZPR began a new antisemitic propaganda campaign after the victory of Israel in the Six-Day War. The campaign was heralded by a speech by First Secretary of the PZPR Władysław Gomułka (the de facto leader of the country), in which he derided Jews celebrating Israel's victory in the war as a "fifth column" and "insinuated that they should be expelled from Poland". The PZPR sought to distract the public from growing areas of dissatisfaction, such as rising food prices, by tapping into the working classes' distrust of Jews, whom the masses perceived as middle or upper-class.

==== Dissidents ====
The leaders of the Polish Workers' Party (PPR; the predecessor of the PZPR) labelled any and all dissidents, including other leftists, as "reactionaries".

== Purposes ==
=== Public health ===
The PZPR used propaganda posters to promote public health and work safety initiatives, such as the importance of wearing eye protection whilst welding.

=== Resettlement ===
In the late 1940s, the Soviet Union heavily encouraged Poland to expel ethnic Belorussians and Ukrainians back to the Byelorussian SSR and the Ukrainian SSR respectively. Representatives of the Soviet Union in Poland heavily publicized the monetary benefits of voluntary resettlement, promising land in the USSR to landless peasants and compensation for land owners.

== Media ==
=== Newspapers ===
==== Trybuna Ludu ====
The Polish United Workers' Party used their official newspaper, Trybuna Ludu, to create anti-Catholic sentiment. The newspaper accused the friar Jan Szybowski, from Nowy Targ, of forming a criminal group known as "Volcano", spreading fake news about the state, and supporting Ognia, a criminal gang. It spread stories about priests physically and sexually abusing children, and said that traditional priests were instilling anti-communist values in the youth.

==== Poznaj Swój Kraj ====
The PZPR published a list of predictions regarding the future of Poland in the monthly Poznaj Swój Kraj. Many of the predictions were incorrect and most of them were simply regurgitated propaganda. The newspaper put great emphasis on the life and works of Vladimir Lenin.

== See also ==
- Censorship in Communist Poland
- Education in the Polish People's Republic
- Operation Treblinka
- Polish underground press (bibuła)
- Eastern Bloc information dissemination
