= Education in Poland (disambiguation) =

The article Education in Poland is about education in modern Poland. For other periods of Polish history, see

- Commission of National Education, the origin of public education in Poland, starting in 1773
- Education in the Second Polish Republic, education in the interbellum Poland
- Education in Poland during World War II, education in occupied Poland during World War II
- Education in the Polish People's Republic, education in the Communist Poland
