= 10th-Anniversary Stadium =

Stadium in Warsaw

Coordinates: 52°14′22.10″N 21°2′44.58″E

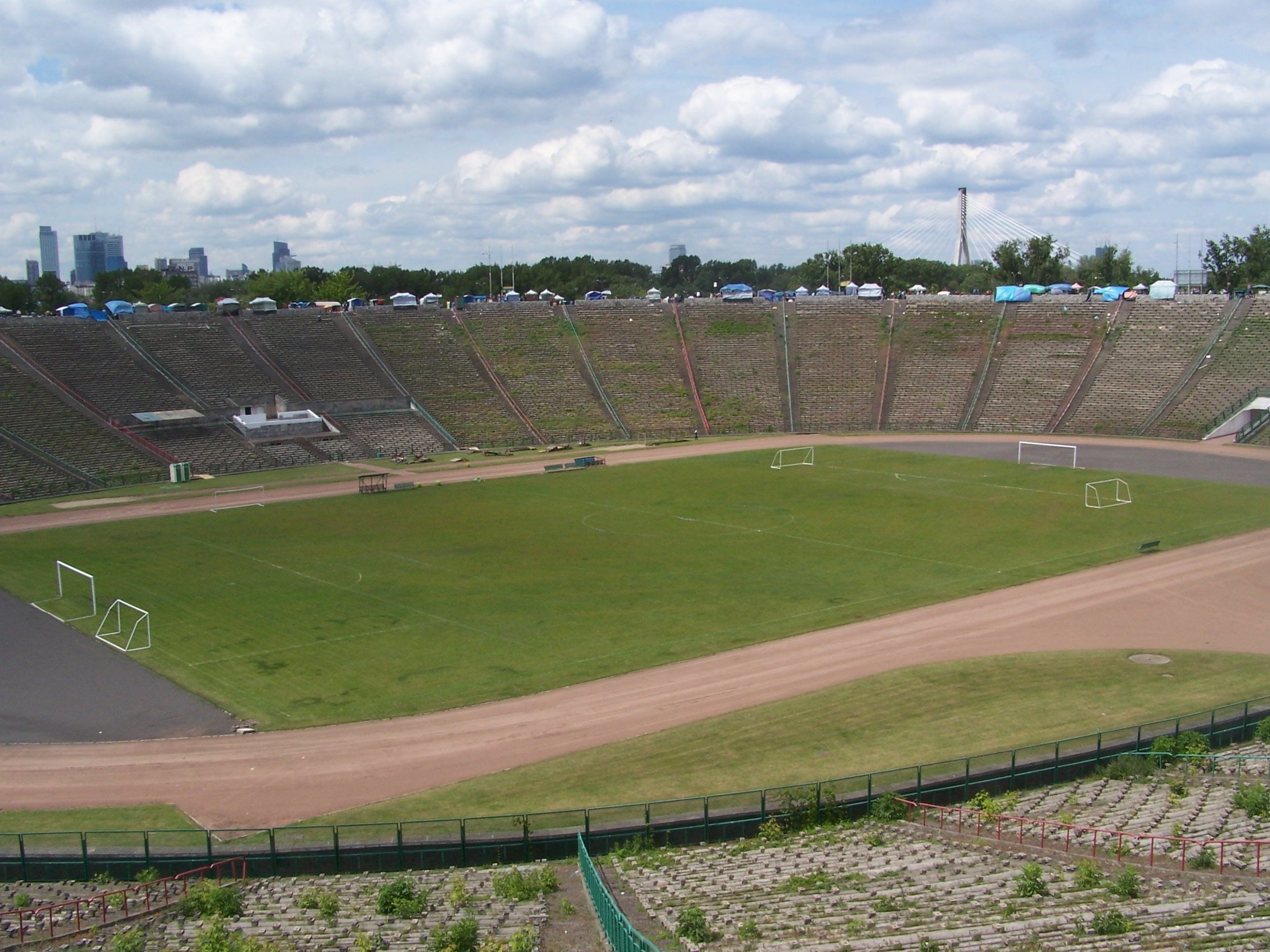
- Stadion Dziesięciolecia in 2006
- Interactive map of 10th-Anniversary Stadium
- Full name: Stadion Dziesięciolecia Manifestu Lipcowego (original name); July Manifesto 10th-Anniversary Stadium
- Location: Warsaw, Poland
- Owner: Skarb Państwa
- Capacity: 71,008 (original)

Construction
- Opened: July 22, 1955
- Closed: September 6, 2008

Tenant
- Poland national football team (1955–1983)

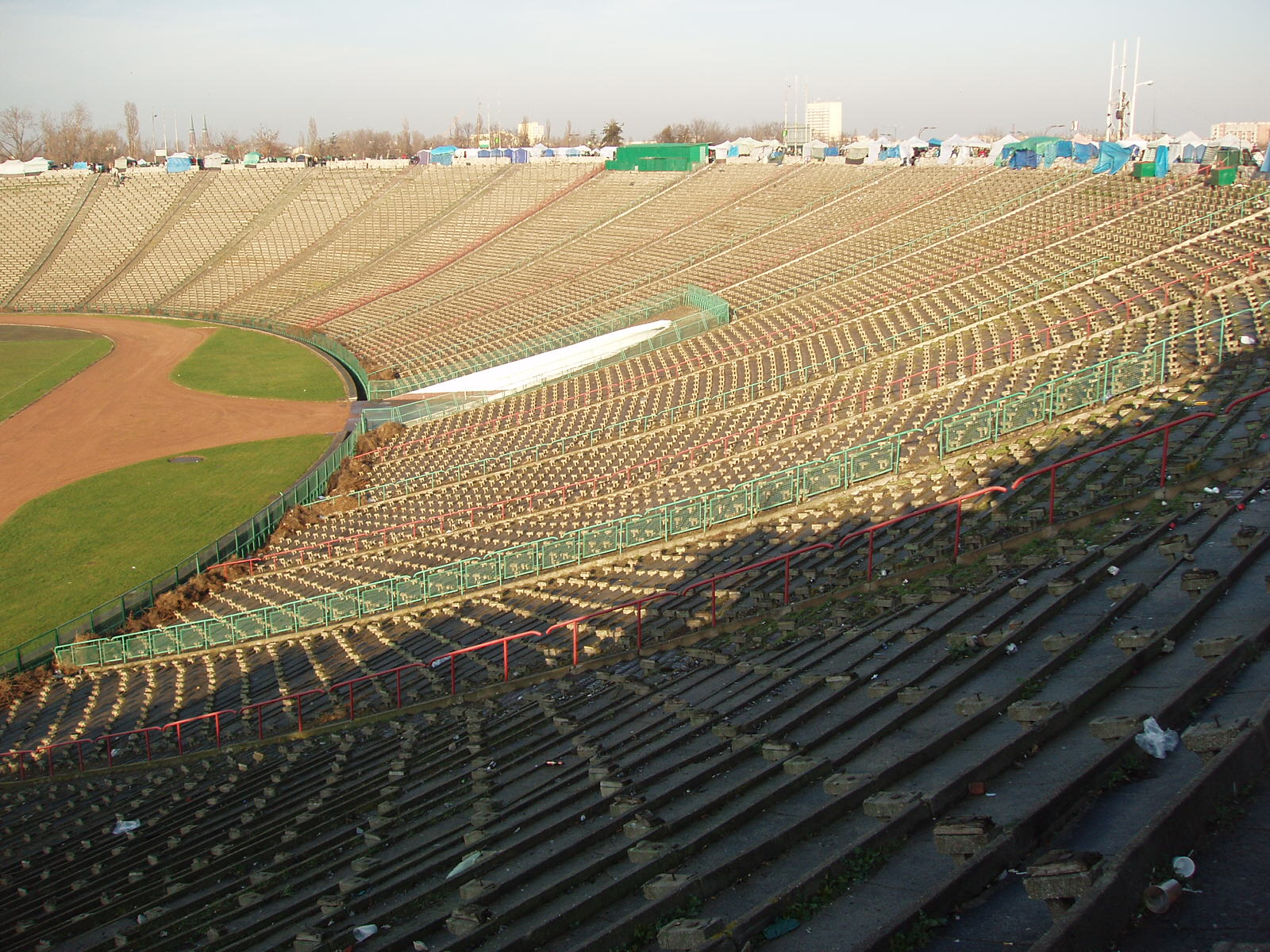
Terracing of the stadium, with market stalls visible at top.

The 10th-Anniversary Stadium (Polish: Stadion Dziesięciolecia), opened in 1955, was for decades the largest stadium in Warsaw, and one of the largest in Poland. Under the Polish People's Republic, it was one of the most advertised construction sites and a principal venue for Party and state festivities. In the 1980s the stadium became dilapidated, as no funds could be found to refurbish it. After 1989 it was used mainly as a bazaar called Jarmark Europa, becoming famous as the place to buy a whole range of goods, most notably clothes, software, hardware and media. Its demolition began in September 2008, and the new National Stadium was constructed in its place to serve as one of the venues for Euro 2012.

== History ==
In 1953 the Association of Polish Architects held an open contest for the project of an "Olympic Stadium for the city of Warsaw". It was won by the team led by Jerzy Hryniewiecki, Zbigniew Ihnatowicz, and Jerzy Sołtan and later the same year the construction was started. The stadium was constructed mostly with rubble from buildings destroyed during the Warsaw Uprising of 1944.

The project involved the construction of an open air oval-shaped Olympic stadium: it contains a football pitch and a 400-metre racing track. Theoretically, the terraces with wooden benches provided seats for 71,008 people, but during the biggest festivals organised there, it accommodated more than 100,000 spectators. In addition, the stadium was equipped with a practice field, a small sports dome, 900 parking spaces and was surrounded by a park. The stadium was also connected to a nearby bus station and a railway station opened specifically for the transport of spectators.

Soon after its opening, it became Poland's national stadium. It housed the most important international football matches and athletics competitions, as well as communist party galas, concerts, and commemorative festivals. In addition, it served as the final lap of the Peace Race. In 1968, it was the site of Ryszard Siwiec's self-immolation in protest at the invasion of Czechoslovakia during a propaganda festival.

In 1983, due to technical problems, the stadium was abandoned. In 1989 it was rented by the City of Warsaw to a company that turned the stadium into an outdoor market known as Jarmark Europa, which soon became Europe's largest open-air market. With over 5,000 traders (and many more unregistered; a large number of traders were from other countries) it was the biggest facility of its kind in Poland. Official figures state an annual turnover of 500 million zlotys, which is generally believed to be an underestimate.

The top tier of the market included vendors of clothing, souvenirs, and bootlegged CDs and movies. Police say the market was the main selling point for black market goods in the country. Between 1995 and 2001 more than 25,000 traders were prosecuted, while approximately 10 million infringing CDs and videotapes were confiscated. Amongst the English-speaking community in Warsaw, the stadium was often referred to as the "Russian market".

== New National Stadium ==
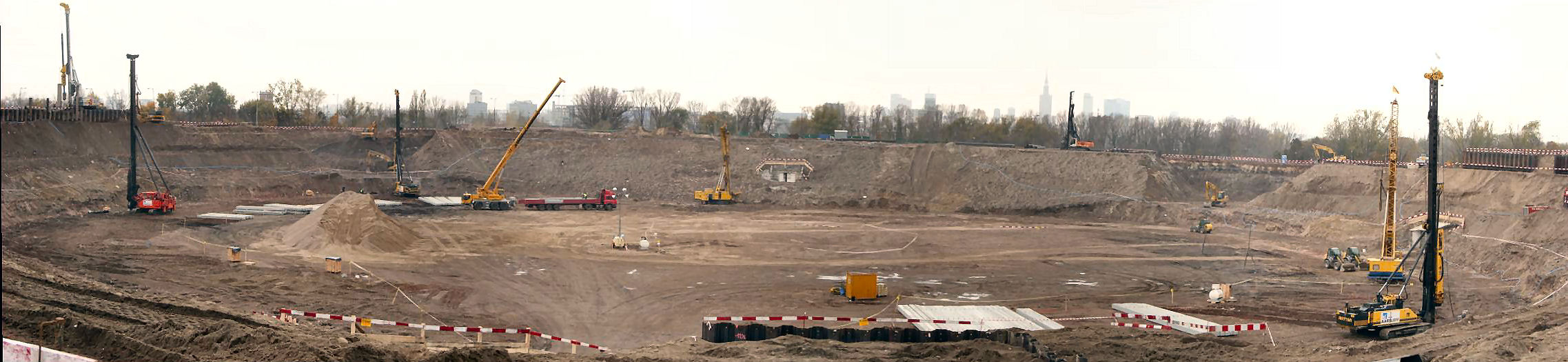
Clearing the ground for the construction of the new National Stadium

The old stadium was demolished to prepare for the construction of the new National Stadium accommodating 55,000 spectators. Construction on the stadium was finished in 2011, and it was one of the stadiums hosting the Euro 2012. Adjoining the new stadium there are to be erected the following structures: a 15,000-seat indoor arena, a new railway station "Warszawa Stadion", a modern hotel, a covered Olympic swimming pool with seats for 4,000 spectators, a meeting hall and a metro station "Stadion" on a yet-to-be built subway line. During the European Championship itself, the following matches are to be played at the stadium: the opening match, group matches, a quarterfinal and a semifinal.

The 10th-Anniversary Stadium and its grounds are the property of the Government of Poland, and the City of Warsaw has declared that for this reason, it would be illegal for the city to financially participate in the project, which is to be financed by the national government.

The building of the National Stadium was delayed by disputes with vendors who protested against orders to leave the 10th-Anniversary Stadium.

== See also ==
- Silesian Stadium
