= Censorship in the Polish People's Republic =

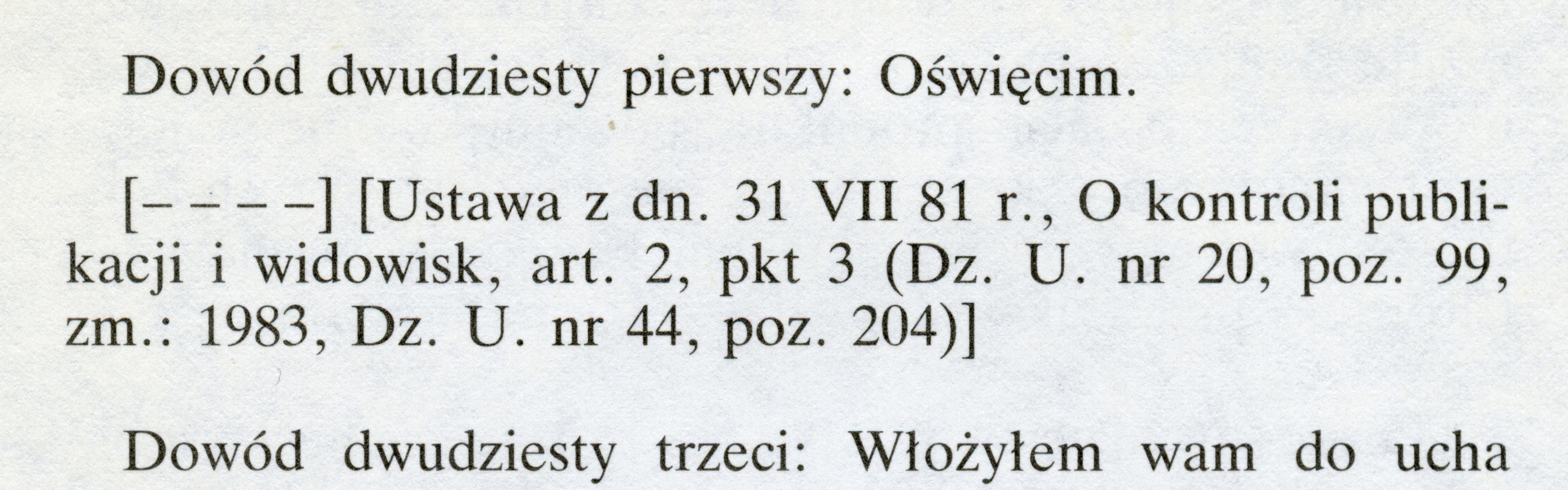
Censorship in the book by André Frossard

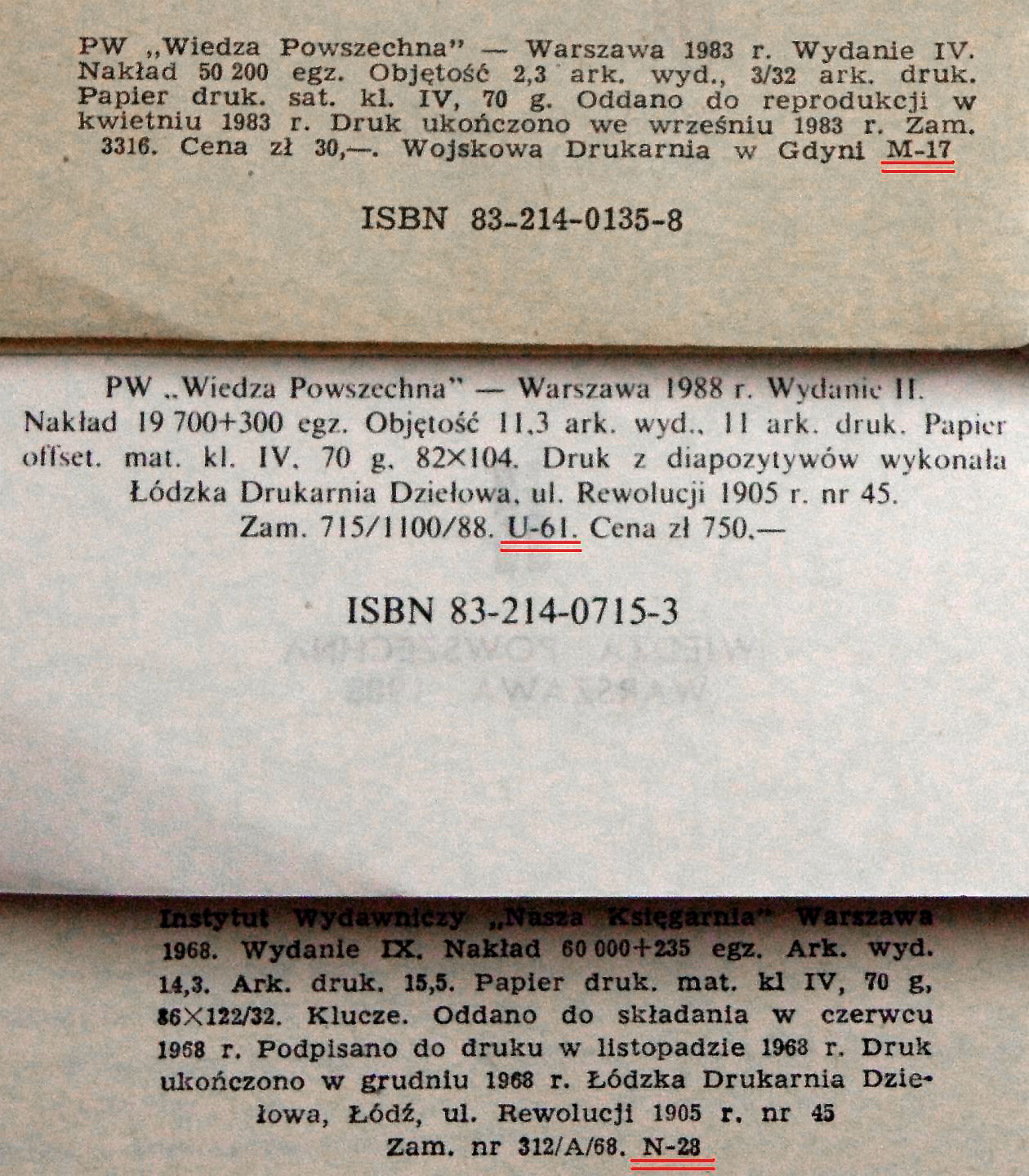
The codes assigned to the censors were printed as part of the colophons in the book blocks – underlined in red

Censorship in Communist Poland was primarily performed by the Polish Main Office of Control of Press, Publications and Shows (Główny Urząd Kontroli Prasy, Publikacji i Widowisk), a governmental institution created in 1946 by the pro-Soviet Provisional Government of National Unity with Stalin's approval and backing, and renamed in 1981 as the Główny Urząd Kontroli Publikacji i Widowisk (GUKPiW). The bureau was liquidated after the fall of communism in Poland, in April 1990.

Library collections were systematically cleansed, the majority of the books destroyed, some isolated in Party or academic libraries. A list of prohibited publications and black-listed writers was created in 1950 during the darkest years of Stalinism in Poland with some 1,682 items, and subsequently modified many times by the communist authorities in the Polish People's Republic. Some writers popular before World War II, for example Wacław Kostek-Biernacki who was sentenced to death as an enemy of the state in 1953, had their books not only removed from libraries, but also meticulously destroyed. In addition to the censorship of the publications, the state also jammed foreign radio stations, such as Radio Free Europe and Voice of America. The decades of relentless censorship fed the underground press and publications in Poland (called bibuła in Polish).

After the rise of Solidarity movement in 1980, independent editors were allowed to indicate, with a sequence [----], that a fragment had been censored, instead of hiding such deletions or withdrawing their entire publications. Publishers demanded the right to leave a white space to indicate how much of the text was cut, but that was rejected. Nevertheless the change spelled a setback for GUKPiW and interventions were less common: an article with dozens of cuts might have a greater impact on the readers' minds than the words missing.

The censorship law was eliminated after the fall of communism in Poland, by the Polish Sejm on 11 April 1990 and the GUKPiW was closed two months later.

== Defection of Tomasz Strzyżewski ==
In 1977 one of the Polish censors, Tomasz Strzyżewski, defected to Sweden with stolen classified documents which he published in the Black Book of Censorship. The book was based on one of two copies of guidelines in the safe of every censorship department of GUKPPiW (Główny Urząd Kontroli Prasy, Publikacji i Widowisk). The official name of the guidelines in Polish was "Książka Zapisów i Zaleceń GUKPPiW" (The Book of Records and Recommendations of GUKPPiW). These materials included photocopies of the originals and personal notes in his notebooks. No-one at his office was allowed to take them out of the building or reprint them: the Bureau censors were allowed only to remove these guidelines from the safe and read them on site. The document was generic in nature: "It's forbidden to write about any info on the disaster in X". "It's forbidden to write about any increase in deaths from xy ". Natural catastrophes, or even carcinogenicity of asbestos, or noxiousness of the plastic used in artificial Christmas trees were also covered there.

Other topics were mentioning the names of censored authors, unless negative arguments about their works were given. Even statistical data about coffee drinking in Poland were banned as this might cause protests against reexporting this product from Poland.

In the 1990s when after the Bureau was dissolved and its archives released, not all copies of such censorship guidelines were submitted and their existence was denied. However some years later former censors of the Bureau confirmed that they had such books in their departments, and that they used it as a reference.

== See also ==
- Czarna ksiega cenzury PRL – The Black Book of the Censorship of People's Poland. In two or one parts called in English: The Black Book of the Censorship of People's Poland—Part 1, ed. T. Strzyżewski, ANEKS, London, 1977 The Black Book of the Censorship of People's Poland—Part 2, ed. T. Strzyżewski, ANEKS, London, 1977.
- Culture in the Polish People's Republic
- Propaganda in the Polish People's Republic
- Eastern Bloc information dissemination
- Katyn massacre

Other Eastern Bloc states:

- Censorship in East Germany
