= Polish University Abroad =

International University

Coordinates: 51°29′34″N 0°13′32″W

- Polski Uniwersytet na Obczyźnie; PUNO
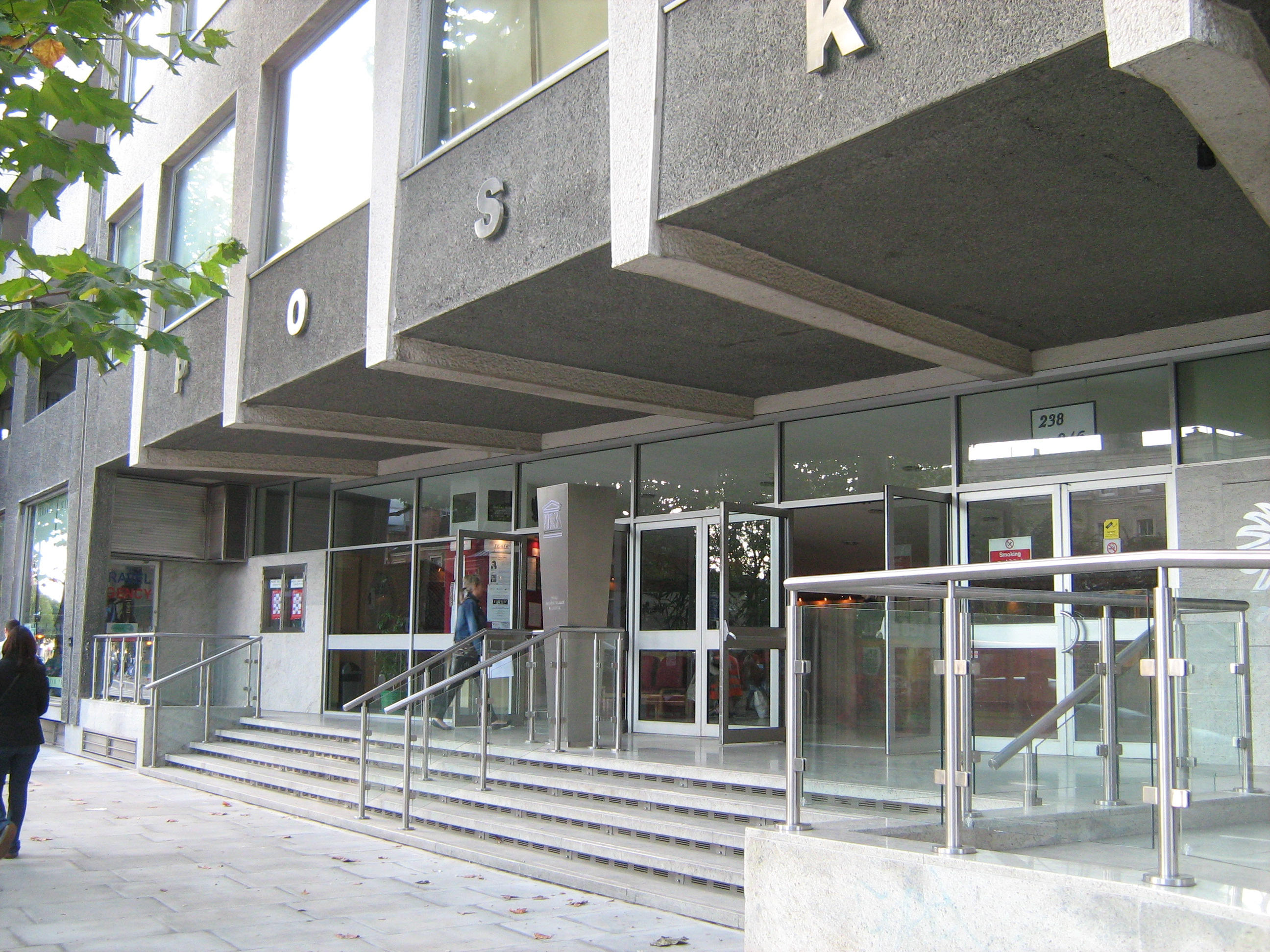
- PUNO headquarters in London
- Other name: Polish University in Exile
- Motto: Vita est tempus discendi
- Motto in English: Life is the time to seek
- Established: 1949
- Rector: Włodzimierz Mier-Jędrzejowicz
- Deputy Rector: Grażyna Czubińska
- Location: 238–246 King Street, London, W6 0RF, England
- Website: puno.ac.uk
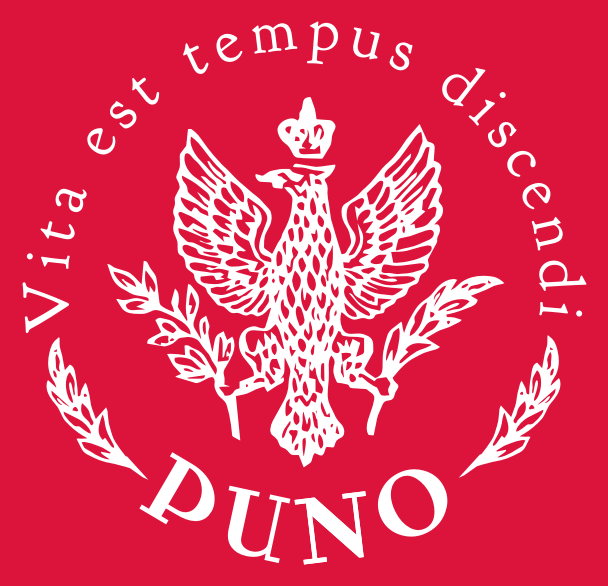

The Polish University Abroad, or Polish University in Exile (Polish: Polski Uniwersytet na Obczyźnie, abbreviated PUNO), was initially established in London in 1949 (de facto 1952).

The Polish University Abroad has a B.A. programme and does research. It has outposts in Paris, France, and Munich, Germany.

PUNO is based at the Polish Social and Cultural Centre in Hammersmith, London. The nearest underground station is Ravenscourt Park.

== Rectors of PUNO ==
- Prof. Tadeusz Brzeski (1951–1958)
- Prof. Cezaria Jędrzejewiczowa (1958–1967)
- Prof. Tadeusz Sulimirski (1967–1978)
- Prof. Jerzy Gawenda (1978–1987)
- Prof. Mieczysław Sas-Skowroński (1987–1993)
- Prof. Wojciech Falkowski (2002–2011)
- Prof. Halina Taborska (2011–2017)
- Prof. Tomasz J. Kaźmierski (2017–2021)
- Prof. Włodzimierz "Włodek" Anthony Christopher Mier-Jędrzejowicz (2021–2025)
