= Education in the Second Polish Republic =

The unified system of education in the Second Polish Republic was attempted in 1920, later superseded by the Jędrzejewicz reform, named after Janusz Jędrzejewicz, approved by the Sejm in 1932. The resulting system was in force essentially until 1948, when it was superseded by the Communist system of education in the Polish People's Republic. The Jędrzejewicz reform received controversial recognition. On one hand, it introduced compulsory education and unified credentials of various schools at their relative educational levels. On the other hand, it introduced a considerable degree of interference of the state into issues of academic freedom.

== Background ==
At the moment of the regaining of the independence by Poland in 1918 and the establishment of the Second Polish Republic, its system of education was in disarray, mainly due to more than a century of partitions of Poland by Austria-Hungary, the German, and the Russian Empires.

== Jędrzejewicz reform ==
The education reform was approved by the Sejm on March 11, 1932 On March 15, 1933 the reform was extended to encompass the higher education.
