= Romualda Baudouin de Courtenay =

Polish historian

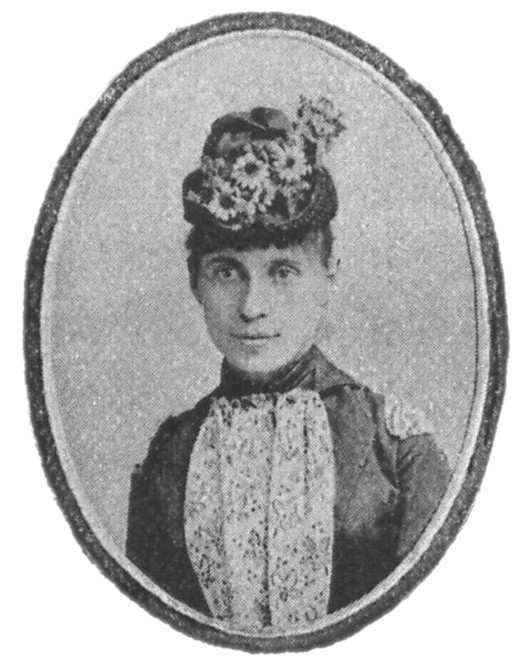
- Portrait of Romualda Baudouin de Courtenay from the book Upominek.
- Born: Romualda Bagnicka; November 17, 1857; Kyiv
- Died: February 26, 1935 (aged 77); Warsaw
- Occupation: Historian
- Spouse: Jan Niecisław Baudouin de Courtenay

Romualda Baudouin de Courtenay, née Bagnicka (born November 17, 1857, in Aleksandrówka near Kyiv, died February 26, 1935, in Warsaw) was a Polish historian, specialist in Polish-Russian affairs, and author of books, diaries and journalistic articles. She was married to noted linguist Jan Niecisław Baudouin de Courtenay.

== Biography ==
Baudouin de Courtenay was born November 17, 1857, in Warsaw of mother Anna Głuchowska and father Romuald Bagnicki, a doctor. Her mother left her father to raise their three children alone, including Romualda, a sister Janicki, and a brother Darius. They lived in Saint Petersburg at the time. Beginning in 1870, she attended the gymnasium in St. Petersburg. In 1878, she began her studies at the Bestuzhev Courses in St. Petersburg.

In her career, Baudouin de Courtenay wrote extensively for magazines and newspapers, including reviews, cultural articles, correspondence, stories, memoirs and critical articles. Publications she wrote for included Pravda (Warsaw), Kraj of St. Petersburg, Kurier Codzienny of Warsaw, Nowa Reforma of Kraków, Czas in Kraków, in the collection "Charitas" (Petersburg, 1894), in the Lusatian periodical "Užica" (Budyszyn) and others. She was also a regular correspondent and collaborator at the Czech magazine "Slovanský přehled". For several years (1893-1900) her reviews of the political, social and artistic life of Krakow and Galicia were published in the newspaper "Kraj" (Petersburg) under pseudonyms. In the same newspaper, from 1901, she published annual reports on artistic life and exhibitions in St. Petersburg. In the years 1885–1898 she kept a diary, Notes on children and family memories, in which she recorded the developmental progress of her children, as well as vivid descriptions of events from her social and family life.

From 1905 to 1911 Baudouin de Courtenay published articles on women's issues in bodies specifically protecting the interests of women's equality in the women's magazine Ster (Warsaw) or "Związek Kobiet" (Petersburg). At the same time, she took part in social activism, e.g. fighting alcoholism . She also participated in various organizations such as the Association of Scientific Assistance for Polish Women, the Polish Society for Aid to Victims of War, and the Prisoners' Aid Circle.

Historical works written by Baudouin de Courtenay include: Political profiles: Stanisław Stojałowski, Ignacy Daszyński, Jakób Bojko, Jan Stapiński, Karol Lewakowski (Kraków 1897), Confidential correspondence of an ex-diplomatic agent with a lady 1813-1819 (Kraków 1886), New materials to the history of Kościuszko (Kraków 1889), and others. She translated into Russian the work of Władysław Łoziński Djarjuszek, an inhabitant of Lviv, from 1606.

== Rodzina ==
In 1882, she married Jan Baudouin de Courtenay. The two had five children:

- Cezaria Baudouin de Courtenay, later Cezaria Jędrzejewiczowa (1885–1967) – professor of ethnography at the University of Warsaw.
- Zofia Baudouin de Courtenay (1887–1967), painter and sculptor, living in Częstochowa
- Świętosław Baudouin de Courtenay (1888–1960), lawyer and diplomat
- Ewelina Małachowska-Łempicka (1892–1984), historian, married to Stanisław Jan Małachowski-Łempicki (1884–1959)
- Maria Kieresant-Wiśniewska (1897–1945), lawyer, wife of doctor Sławomir Kieresant-Wiśniewski.

She is buried in the Małachowski family tomb at the Powązki Cemetery in Warsaw (section 21-4-4/5) .

== Bibliography ==
- H. Witkowska, Baudouin de Courtenay Romualda, [w:] Polski Słownik Biograficzny, t. 1, Kraków 1935, s. 362–363
- D. Zamojska, Romualda z Bagnickich Baudouin de Courtenay (1857–1935) i jej działalność społeczna, [w:] „Kobieta i świat polityki”, red. A. Żarnowska, A. Szwarc, t. 3, Warszawa 1994, s. 261–274.
