= Jędrzejewicz reform =

1932 reform of Polish education

Jędrzejewicz reform was a major reform of the education in the Second Polish Republic, implemented in 1932. It reorganized the structure of Polish education, which diverged into three different systems during the era of partitions of Poland. It was named after Minister of Education, Janusz Jędrzejewicz who supervised the reform.

The education reform was approved by the Sejm on March 11, 1932 On March 15, 1933 the reform was extended to encompass the higher education.

The Jędrzejewicz reform received controversial recognition. From one hand, it introduced compulsory education and unified credentials of various schools at their relative educational levels. On the other hand, it introduced a considerable degree of the interference of the state into the issues of academic freedom, in line with the overall politics of Józef Piłsudski.
