= Zofia Sadowska =

Polish medical doctor and social activist

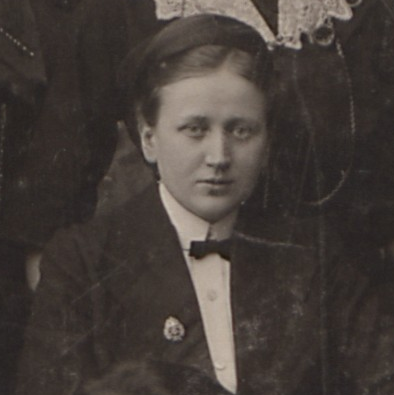
- Sadowska in 1910
- Born: 28 February 1887; Warsaw
- Died: 7 March 1960 (aged 73); Warsaw
- Occupations: Doctor, social activist

Zofia Anastazja Sadowska (born 28 February 1887 in Warsaw; died 7 March 1960 in Warsaw) was a Polish medical doctor, feminist and social activist.

== Early life, work and research ==
She was born in a noble family (bearing Lubicz coat of arms), to Stanisław Sadowski and Maria Zofia née Kuczker. She graduated with a gold medal from the 4th Women's Gymnasium in Warsaw at Kapucyńska Street. In 1904 she began studies at the Women's Medical Institute in Saint-Petersburg, which she graduated with the highest honors in 1911. In 1914, she was the first woman and the first Polish woman to defend her doctorate ("On the influence of non-proteinogenic amines on peripheral vessels") at the Military Medical Academy in Saint-Petersburg. She worked as an internist in several cities of the Russian Empire, incl. in hospitals of the Russian Red Cross during World War I. In 1918, she returned to Warsaw, where she became an assistant in the 2nd clinic of internal diseases and pathological anatomy of the newly created medical department of the University of Warsaw, and opened a private practice. During the war of 1920, she was assigned to the military epidemiological hospital in Grodno. She had a reputation for being an excellent diagnostician.

== Social work and activism ==
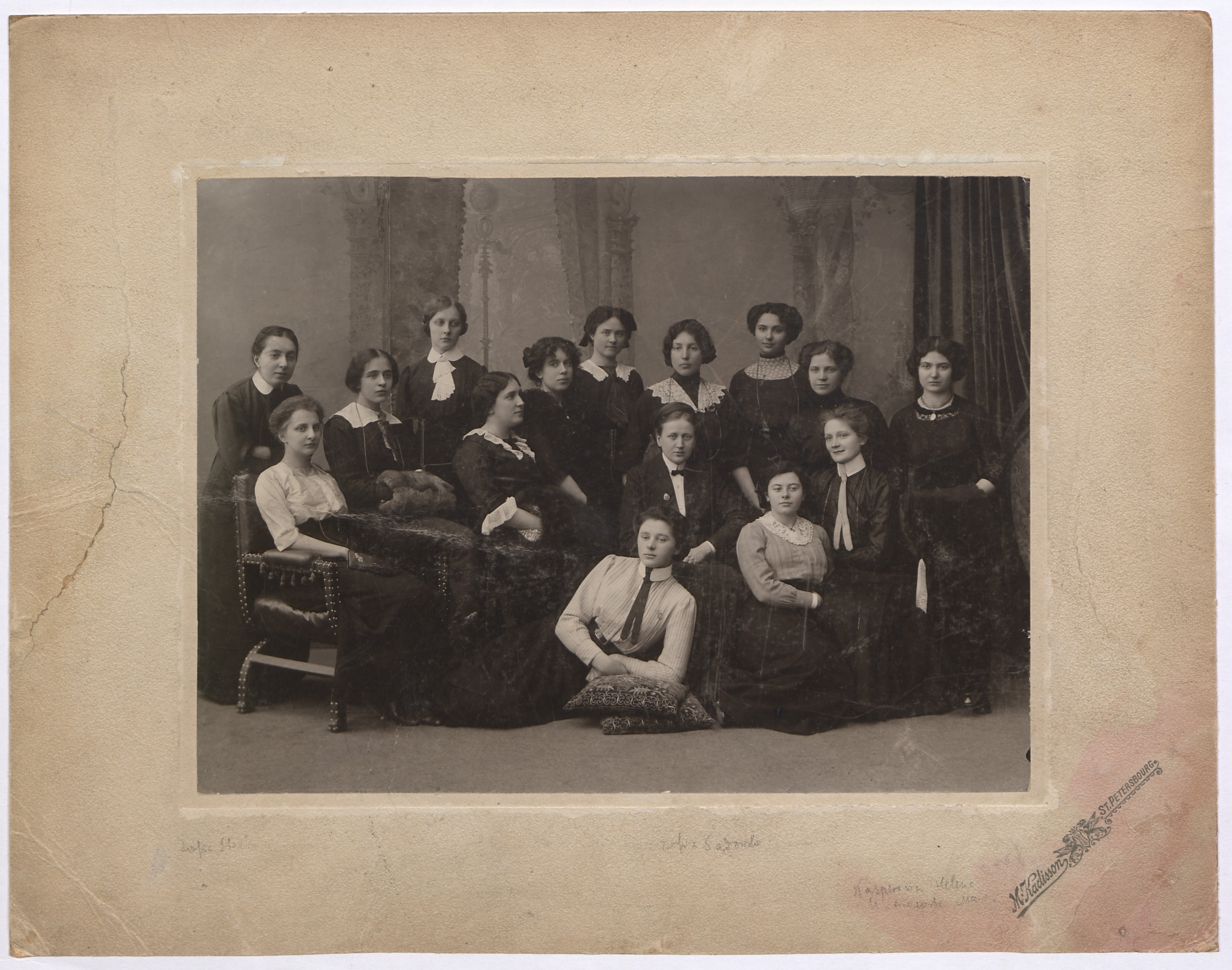
Photography of Association of Polish Women Students Spójnia members, Sadowska sitting in the middle

From an early age, she was involved in social activism and the fight for women's rights. As a high school student, she belonged to self-education clubs, after graduating from high school, she studied in the so-called Flying University. During the school strike in the Kingdom of Poland (1905–1906), she organized secret classes where she gave lectures on mathematics and physics. During her Saint-Petersburg studies, she belonged to the Polish Women's Equality Association (Związek Równouprawnienia Kobiet Polskich) (Note: The association was founded in 1907 and operated until World War I.) (she was the chair of Saint-Petersburg section and a permanent delegate to the general councils of the Association in Warsaw), she wrote to the Warsaw periodical „Ster". (Note: Press associeted with the women's equality movement. The magazine was published in 1895–97 in Lviv, and then it was reactivated in 1907 in Warsaw, where it was published by the Polish Women's Equality Association until 1914.) She co-founded and then was (with e.g. Cezaria Jędrzejewiczowa and Kazimiera Iłłakowiczówna) a member of the governing bodies of the Association of Polish Women Students – Spójnia, within which she led the section of medics. She was the vice-president of the board of the student treasury, she founded student discussion clubs. During World War I, she was active in the Saint-Petersburg branch of the Polish Society for Aid to War Victims (Polskie Towarzystwo Pomocy Ofiarom Wojny).

On 11 November 1918 she became part of a three-person delegation demanding the right to vote from Józef Piłsudzki. In February 1919, she ran for the Warsaw City Council from the ninety-eighth place on the list of the National Electoral Committee, without obtaining a seat on the council.

== 1920s lesbian scandal ==
Probably ever since World War I, Zofia Sadowska dressed in a masculine fashion. She also had not particularly secret or hidden love relationships with women before. Late 1923, the Warsaw tabloid "Express Poranny" (issue 318), followed by subsequent Warsaw and non-Warsaw newspapers, published sensational information about the events that supposedly took place in the apartment and office of "Dr. S." at Mazowiecka Street 7. The press accused Zofia Sadowska of seducing female patients (including minors), organizing lesbian orgies with sadistic elements, running a lesbian brothel and administering drugs to women to make them dependent on her (the police investigation did not prove the truthfulness of the charges). These publications began a several-year-long "Ancient Greek (lesbian) scandal" related to the person of Dr. Sadowska. As she failed to get the corrections published, Zofia Sadowska took legal action and accused Jerzy Plewiński, editor-in-chief of Express Poranny. and its publisher Antoni Lewandowski for libel (under Art. 533 of the Penal Code).

The "great trial with a deep moral foundation", held on 11–16 February 1924 in the 2nd Criminal Division of the District Court at 15 Miodowa Street, attracted enormous interest among the residents of Warsaw and the capital and national press. It resulted in the court's decision of closing the door to the public on the first day. During the trial, in which the most famous lawyers at the time were involved on both sides (the accusation Marian Niedzielski, the defense Mieczysław Ettinger and Stefan Perzyński), numerous representatives of the medical community and famous Warsaw actors (Lucyna Messal, Hanka Ordonówna, Maria Majdrowiczówna) testified. Medical opinions were presented by leading specialists in forensic medicine and psychiatry. The fact that the trial was called the "Sadowska case" emphasizes that the main topic in the courtroom was the sexual orientation and lifestyle of the accuser. The tabloid press (acting as a defender of morality) called Sadowska "a social pest" and "an enemy of the state and society", and blamed her for breaking up marriages and leading to at least one suicide. Questioned by the defense lawyer, Sadowska said that "the accusation of practicing lesbian love is not disgraceful". The court ruled against Jerzy Plewiński, who was sentenced to a week's arrest, a fine and the payment of court fees. After the appeal, Plewiński was acquitted, however, as was Henryk Butkiewicz, the publisher of "Kurier Czerwony" (a magazine from the same media concern Dom Prasy SA), whom Sadowska also sued for libel. The third case brought by her, against the private detective Stanisław Antoni Wotowski, commissioned to deliver denunciations on Sadowska to public and social institutions, ended with his acquittal in the first instance. In 1925, Zofia Sadowska herself was brought to the court of the Warsaw-Białystok Medical Chamber, and then to the Supreme Medical Chamber Court. At the end of 1926, said court sentenced her for "acts inconsistent with medical ethics" for one year's revocation of the right to practice.

== Further life ==
The scandal put an end to Zofia Sadowska's scientific career. In the 1920s, she took part in at least the first four ladies rallies in Poland. In the 1930s she worked as an assistant at the Departments of Anatomy and Pathology at the University of Warsaw. At the end of the 1930s, she moved out of the 7 Mazowiecka Street apartment to live and run an office at Three Crosses Square 8. During World War II, she organized an infirmary at Grójecka Street, and during the Warsaw Uprising, a field hospital in Okęcie, later transformed into the Warsaw Children's Home. After the war, she became the president of the Society of Polish-Soviet Friendship in Okęcie and continued her work of a Warsaw doctor. She died in 1960 at the age of 73, having left her whole inheritance to Helena Suska (primo voto Szwejcer). Życie Warszawy published an obituary in which the doctor was incorrectly named Dr. Maria Sadowska. The funeral was organized by friends from medical circles. She was buried at Warsaw's Powązki Cemetery (plot 29, row 1, grave 10) next to her mother (signed on her tombstone as Zofia Kowalkowska, 1 voto Sadowska).

== Reception ==
Due to the scandal, the figure of Zofia Sadowska as a scientist and doctor has been erased from collective memory. She appears only in a few memories of her contemporaries (Romana Pachucka, Andrzej Wierzbicki and Józef Mieczysław Pfeiffer do not mention her private life or the events of 1923–27; only Irena Krzywicka mentions "a lesbian scandal"). It was not until the beginning of the 21st century that the subject was taken up by the authors of the calendar "LESteśmy – byłyśmy", and then the literary scholar Krzysztof Tomasik (Homobiografie, 2008), gay rights activist Wojciech Szot, who after writing articles about Sadowska published her biography Panna doktór Sadowska in 2020 and historian Agnieszka Weseli who since 2012 has been organizing in Warsaw yearly parties to commemorate Sadowska on her birthday.
