= Kazimiera Iłłakowiczówna =

Polish poet, playwright and translator

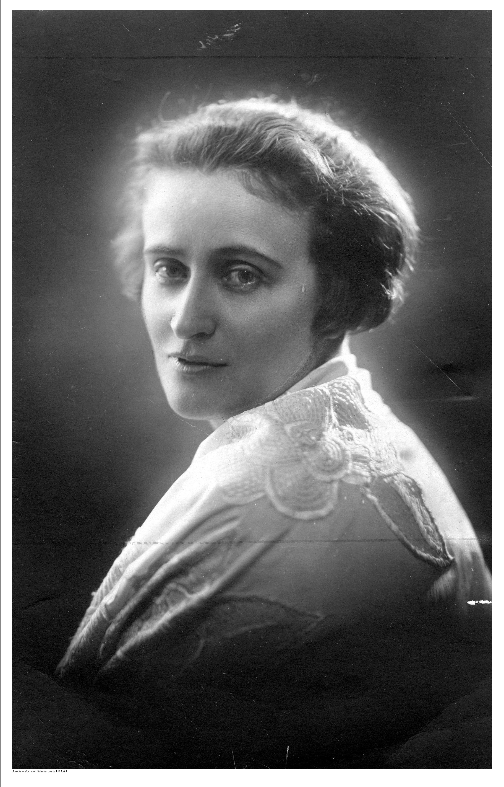
- Born: 6 August 1892; Vilnius, Russian Empire (now Lithuania)
- Died: 16 February 1983 (aged 90); Poznań, Poland
- Education: University of Oxford; Jagiellonian University
- Occupations: poet, prose writer, playwright, translator

Kazimiera Iłłakowiczówna (6 August 1892 – 16 February 1983) was a Polish poet, prose writer, playwright and translator. She was one of the most acclaimed and celebrated poets during Poland's interwar period.

== Life and work ==
She was born on 6 August 1892, in Vilnius (now Lithuania, but then part of the Russian Empire). Her mother was Barbara Iłłakowiczówna, and her father was Klemens Zan (son of Tomasz Zan - a close friend of Adam Mickiewicz). She was orphaned at an early age and was brought up in a family of her relatives. Zofia Buyno (née Zyberk-Plater) became her foster mother. Between 1908-1909, she studied at University of Oxford. She co-founded and then was (with eg. Cezaria Jędrzejewiczowa and Zofia Sadowska) a member of the Association of Polish Women Students - Spójnia in Saint Petersburg, within which she led the literary and discussion clubs, based on the ones she witnessed at Oxford. In the years 1910-1914 she studied at the Jagiellonian University in Kraków. In 1915-1917, she worked as a nurse assistant in the Imperial Russian Army. Beginning in 1918, she worked for the Ministry of Foreign Affairs of the Second Polish Republic. In 1924, Iłłakowiczówna published an anthology of poems in honor of Monsignor Konstanty Budkiewicz's life and martyrdom by the Soviet secret police inside Moscow's Lubyanka Prison upon Easter Sunday, 1923. Modeled after the traditional oral poetry of the Polish peasantry, the collection was titled Opowieść o moskiewskim męczeństwie ("The Story of the Moscow Martyr").

Between 1926-1935, Iłłakowiczówna served as Marshal Józef Piłsudski's secretary. In the interwar period, her works were published in literary press, most notably in the literary magazine Tęcza ("Rainbow") in Poznań. In 1939, when the World War II broke out, she was evacuated to Romania. She returned to Poland in 1947 and settled in Poznań.

She was widely regarded as one of the most important literary figures of the interwar period in Warsaw. She became fascinated with the feminist movement and during her stay in London she familiarized herself with the works of Emmeline Pankhurst, which encouraged her to take active part in the distribution of suffragette brochures. Nonetheless, she remained a deeply religious person throughout her life, strongly adhering to the Christian values and spirituality. Iłłakowiczówna had a wide circle of friends, many of which were well-known intellectuals, prominent poets and artists including Stanisław Ignacy Witkiewicz, Julian Tuwim and Maria Dąbrowska. She also translated works of European literature by such writers as Johann Wolfgang von Goethe, Friedrich Schiller, Heinrich Böll and Leo Tolstoy as well as the American poet Emily Dickinson, she also worked as a teacher of English. In the last years of her life, she became blind as a result of unsuccessful glaucoma surgery. She died on 16 February 1983 and was buried at the Powązki Cemetery in Warsaw.

== Awards and distinctions ==
- Literary Award of the City of Vilnius (1930)
- Officer's Cross of the Order of Polonia Restituta (1934)
- Golden Laurel of the Polish Academy of Literature (1935)
- Commander's Cross of the Order of the Crown of Romania (1938)
- Award of the City of Poznań (1968)
- Honorary doctorate of the Adam Mickiewicz University (1981)

== Selected publications ==
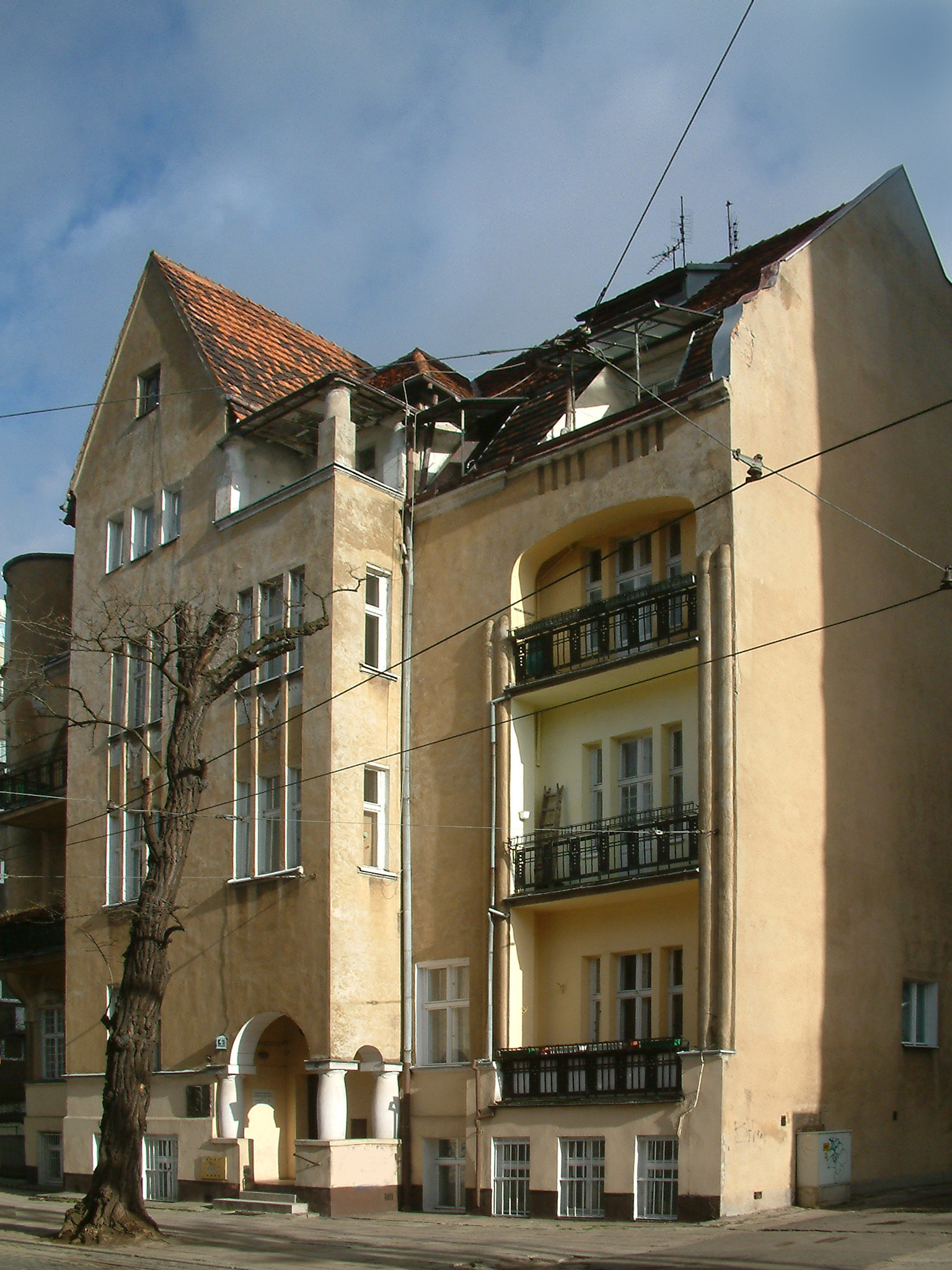
Kazimiera Iłłakowiczówna Museum in Poznań

- Ikarowe loty ("Flights of Icarus") (1912)
- Trzy struny ("Three Strings") (1917)
- Kolędy polskiej biedy. W Wigilię powrotu (1917)
- Śmierć Feniksa ("The Death of Phoenix") (1922)
- Rymy dziecięce ("Children's Rhymes") (1923)
- Połów ("Halves") (1926)
- Opowieść o moskiewskim męczeństwie. Złoty wianek ("A Tale of Moscow Martydom. Golden Wreath") (1927)
- Płaczący ptak ("The Crying Bird") (1927)
- Z głębi serca (From the Depth of My Heart) (1928)
- Popiół i perły ("Ashes and Pearls") (1930)
- Ballady bohaterskie ("Heroic Ballads") (1934)
- Słowik litewski. Poezja ("Lithuanian Nightingale. Poetry") (1936)
- "Wiersze o Marszałku Piłsudskim. 1912-1935" ("Poems on Marshal Józef Piłsudski. 1912-1935") (1936)
- Ścieżka obok drogi (1939)
- Wiersze religijne. 1912-1954 ("Religious Poems. 1912-1954") (1955)
- Wiersze dziecięce ("Children's Poems") (1959)
- Zwierzaki i zioła ("Animals and Herbs") (1960)
- Ta jedna nić ("That One Thread") (1967)
- Rzeczy sceniczne (1969)
