= Cezaria Jędrzejewiczowa =

Polish scientist, art historian and anthropologist

Cezaria Baudouin de Courtenay-Ehrenkreutz-Jędrzejewiczowa
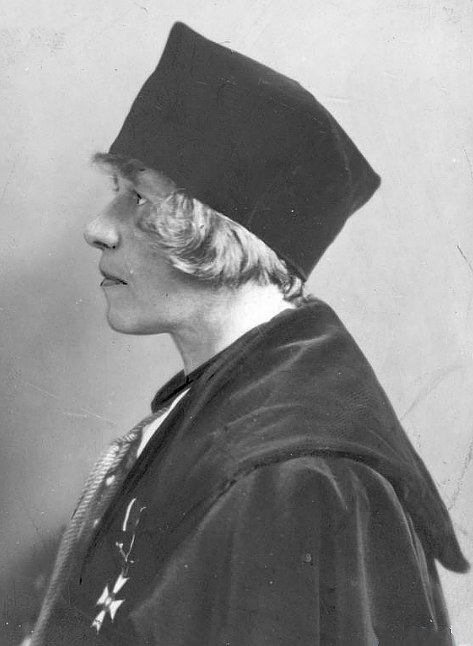
- Cezaria Jędrzejewiczowa in 1934
- Born: 2 August 1885; Dorpat, Russian Empire (modern Tartu, Estonia)
- Died: 28 February 1967 (aged 81); London
- Education: Saint Petersburg Imperial University
- Scientific career
- Fields: ethnography, ethnology, linguistics, museology
- Workplaces: Stefan Batory University of Wilno; University of Warsaw; Polish Scientific Institute of Jerusalem; Polish University Abroad

Cezaria Jędrzejewiczowa, or Cezaria Anna Baudouin de Courtenay Ehrenkreutz-Jędrzejewiczowa, (1885–1967) was a Polish scientist, art historian, and anthropologist. She was one of the pioneers of ethnology in Poland and one of the first scientists to adopt phenomenology in studies of folk culture.

== Life ==
She was born on 2 August 1885 in Dorpat (modern Tartu, Estonia), to Jan Niecisław Baudouin de Courtenay, a noted linguist, and his second wife Romualda Baudouin de Courtenay née Bagnicka, a journalist and historian.

In 1911, she was one of the first women to obtain a first degree diploma from the Saint Petersburg Imperial University, based on her thesis „Język modlitewnika maryjnego, wieku XVI wydanego przez prof. Ptaszyckiego”, ("The language of the Saint Mary prayer book, from 16th century, published by prof. Ptaszycki ") written under the supervision of prof. Tadeusz Zieliński. During her studies, she founded (together with Zofia Sadowska, Stanisława Adamowiczowa and Kazimiera Iłłakowiczówna) the Association of Polish Women "Spójnia", associating women studying at St. Petersburg universities. During this time she published two linguistic works: „Ałbanja i Ałbańcy” and „Kamień Latyr i Gorod Ałtyr”.

In the following years, she returned to the Kingdom of Poland, where she worked in female private gymnasiums in Warsaw. In 1922, she obtained her habilitation at the University of Warsaw on the basis of the dissertation "Św. Cecylia – przyczynek do genezy apokryfów” ("St. Cecylia - a contribution to the genesis of the apocrypha"), published in 1922 in the journal Lud (Folk).

Between 1927 and 1935 she served as a professor and founder of the chairs of ethnography and ethnology at the Stefan Batory University of Wilno (modern Vilnius, Lithuania). She also conducted field research involving students, that was a great importance to her. At the same time, she also taught at the State Gymnasium for Girls as a full-time teacher. In 1935 she moved to the same post at the Warsaw University and occupied it until the Nazi-Soviet invasion of Poland.

Initially married to her father's student Max Vasmer, she divorced him and remarried Stefan Ehrenkreutz, a professor of law and a senator of Poland. She divorced him as well and married for the third time. Her husband, Janusz Jędrzejewicz, was a former Prime Minister of Poland. During World War II she escaped from Poland and settled in the British-held Palestine, where she co-founded the Polish Scientific Institute of Jerusalem, a sort of an exiled university for the soldiers of the Polish II Corps. In 1947 she moved to Great Britain, where she became one of the founding members of the Polish Scientific Society in Exile. In 1951 she became a professor of ethnography at the Polish University Abroad and soon afterwards was chosen its rector.

Jędrzejewiczowa died on 28 February 1967 in London at the age of 82.
