= Propaganda of success =

Propaganda of success is propaganda that exaggerates positive outcomes.

== Characteristics ==
Propaganda of success is characterized by an exaggeration of political successes and economic results. Its goal is to mislead recipients about the factual state of the situation. It portrays an idealized version of life in which everything is better than in reality. For that, it requires the recipient to be poorly informed about the factual state.

Propaganda of success only allows limited criticism, usually the type that can lead to quick and easy solutions, or on the opponents of the existing system which can be blamed for existing inefficiencies. Propaganda of success often employs mass media and censorship.

== Usage ==
The term ("propaganda sukcesu" in Polish) has been used with reference to the propaganda in the People's Republic of Poland of the 1970s (particularly from December 1974), during the rule of Polish United Workers' Party secretary Edward Gierek. Poland was portrayed as a modern country with bright economic future, even though much of Gierek's reforms were based on unsustainable international loans. Common phrases from the Polish propaganda of that era included "building a second Poland" and "Poland - the 8th industrial power of the world."

An instrumental figure in Gierek's administration was Maciej Szczepański, in charge of Polish Radio and Television. Propaganda of success spread to many media; for example all contemporary Polish television series had to respect its ideas. To support the propaganda of success, Polish official statistics, promoted by the media, were often highly selective. Any difficulties, often resulting from the shortage economy, were constantly labelled as "temporary". The era of propaganda of success in Poland came to an end with the 1980s with the wave of strikes and demonstrations against the government which resulted in the rise of the Solidarity trade union. Propaganda of success, contrasting grim, everyday reality with an idealized fictional vision of it has been described as achieving contrary results to the intended and has been named as one of the factors responsible for growing social unrest in Poland.

The term has also been used to describe Soviet propaganda before the era of glasnost.
