= Culture in the Polish People's Republic =

After the end of the Second World War, Polish society and culture were subject to significant changes.

== Post-Second World War ==
With expanding urban industrial opportunities in the early postwar era, agriculture steadily became less popular as occupation and lifestyle in new Poland. The service sector, like industry, grew rapidly, even though much less than the service sectors of Western Europe. The result was a postwar exodus from the rural areas and increased urbanization, which split apart the traditional multigenerational families upon which the prewar mostly rural society had been based.

The early socioeconomic reforms were greeted with relief by a significant faction of the population. Most people were willing to accept Communist rule in exchange for the restoration of relatively normal life. Even the Catholic Church believed that any open resistance would be suicidal. Postwar Poland, like the rest of socialist Eastern Europe, saw growing opportunities for higher education and employment and increased rights for women. In many respects, Poland offered women more opportunities in professional occupations than did many countries in Western Europe. Professions such as architecture, engineering and university teaching employed a considerably higher percentage of women in Poland than in the rest of the West. Communist propaganda, and sometimes reality itself, has created the model of the "Communist woman worker", similar to the "woman miner" in Silesia, initially part of the forcible socialist trend in art and culture dominating from the late 1940s to late 1950s. By the year 1980, the majority of Polish medical students were women.

== Rebuilding ==
Polish society had already been brought to the edge of disintegration by the ravages of war. In 1945 Warsaw and other cities lay in ruins, and many smaller towns, which had been populated by Jews before the War, were half-empty. Half of the prewar Polish intelligentsia, mainly those of Jewish or middle-class origins, were dead or in political exile. Many children had gone six years without school. Under these circumstances, the political struggle for total control of all aspect of social and economic life in Poland favoured the communists, who held control of the government and security apparatus. Nonetheless a latent popular discontent remained present.

Students in a classroom of the Stefan Batory Lyceum, c. 1947

In the early postwar years, only a minority of new recruits from agricultural career were literate. In contrast, by the late 1970s only 5% of workers lacked a complete elementary education. In the same period, the central planning system yielded impressive gains in the education level and living standards for much of the new urban industrial workforce.

== Advances ==
In the first two decades of the Communist rule, the health of Poland's people improved overall, as antibiotics became available and the standard of living rose in most areas. The extension of medical services also contributed to this trend. Codifying such advancements, the constitution of 1952 guaranteed universal free health care. However, by the 1970s and 1980s, critical national health indicators showed many negative trends, as economic conditions deteriorated, which, combined with small wages in the medical system, led to rampant corruption.

One of the major achievements during the communist period was the massive housing estate boom. Following wartime destruction of homes, and a population which boomed in the 1950s, there were massive housing availability pressures, which were relieved by large-scale infrastructure building, particularly from the Gierek era onwards. This massive improvement to the population's quality of life however, became insufficient as soon as the baby boomers came of age.

== Communist role ==
Following World War II, many Poles believed that Poland, unlike other Eastern European countries, did not need an additional phase of terror. Within years, tens of thousands of Poles had joined the Communist Party as well as the Social Democratic and Trade Union organizations in order to create what they saw as the society of the future.

Founded in the late 1950s, the first workers' councils to voice opinions on industrial policy, based on the "Polish October" of 1956, marked a fundamental change in the social awareness of the working class. The increasingly literate leadership of these councils, dominated by the rising number of workers that had acquired secondary education, would eventually lead to the formidable labour and professional organizations such as KOR and Solidarność that would gradually come to threaten the socialist order.

Despite the gains in the living standards for much of the growing urban workforce after World War II, with the increasing influence of outside ideas from the West brought by television, radio (such as Radio Free Europe) and magazines, often smuggled by Poles returning to the country, social dissatisfaction with the regime increased, as people became aware of viable alternatives to their lifestyle. By the 1980s, the modernization of Polish society would lead to a complete restructuring of Poland's political life.

An important role in shaping of the social attitudes of Poles was played by culture and art. Despite censorship and administrative interference, the patronage of the state and some leeway left to artistic creativity permitted the development of the Polish film school, theater, arts, music and literature after destalinization of 1956. Of great importance to the loosened fetters of censorship was the literary and scientific activity pursued in exile. Radio Free Europe played a significant role in molding public opinion. Similar roles were played by the Paris-based periodical "Kultura" and a number of similar publications. As a result, Poles were not isolated from European culture, which was, indeed, so close to them. The importance of the émigré cultural community was highlighted by the awarding of the Nobel Prize for literature to Czesław Miłosz in 1980.

== See also ==
- Socialist realism in Poland
