= Janusz Jędrzejewicz =

Polish politician and educator

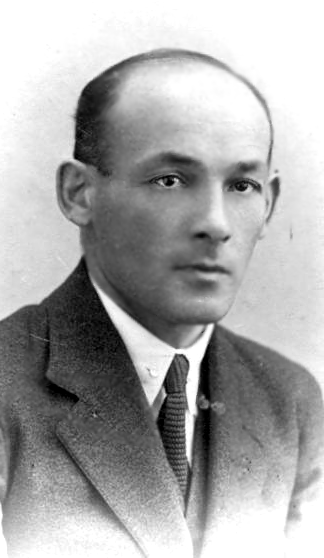

24th Prime Minister of Poland
- In office 10 May 1933 – 13 May 1934
- President: Ignacy Mościcki
- Preceded by: Aleksander Prystor
- Succeeded by: Leon Kozłowski

Personal details
- Born: 21 June 1885 Spychyntsi, Berdichevsky Uyezd, Kiev Governorate, Russian Empire
- Died: 16 March 1951 (aged 65) London, United Kingdom
- Resting place: Elmers End Cemetery
- Party: Polish Socialist Party
- Spouse: Cezaria Baudouin de Courtenay Ehrenkreutz Jędrzejewiczowa
- Occupation: Politician, soldier, educator

Janusz Jędrzejewicz (Polish pronunciation: [ˈjanuʂ jɛnd.ʐɛˈjɛvit͡ʂ]; 21 June 1885 – 16 March 1951) was a Polish politician and educator, one of the leaders of the Sanacja political group, and 24th Prime Minister of Poland from 1933 to 1934.

== Life ==
He joined Józef Piłsudski's Polish Socialist Party in 1904. After World War I broke out, he joined the Polish Legions and the Polish Military Organization. In 1918 he joined the Polish Army and served as aide to Piłsudski. In 1919, he was transferred to Section II (Intelligence) at the Lithuanian-Belarusian Front Headquarters, and later to the General Staff.

After the Polish–Soviet War, in 1923 Jędrzejewicz became a politician. He was elected a deputy to the Polish Sejm (1928–35) and later a senator. In 1930–1935 he was vice-president of the Nonpartisan Bloc for Cooperation with the Government (BBWR). From 12 August 1931, to 22 February 1934, he served as minister of education. He introduced a reform of Poland's educational system that came to be named, after him, "Jędrzejewicz reform." From 10 May 1933, to 13 May 1934, he was Prime Minister of Poland.

In 1926, he founded the monthly, Wiedza i Życie. In 1929, he organized a teachers' union, Zrąb, and other educational societies, including the Polish Academy of Literature. He was also co-author of the 1935 Polish Constitution. After Piłsudski's death in 1935, he opposed the Camp of National Unity (OZN, Ozon) and the right wing of the Sanacja movement, and retired from political life.

After the Soviet invasion during the Polish Defensive War of 1939, he fled to Romania and later through Palestine to London. In 1948, he was chosen to be head of Liga Niepodległości Polski, a political party in exile. He died in 1951.

He was a brother of Wacław Jędrzejewicz and married Cezaria Baudouin de Courtenay Ehrenkreutz Jędrzejewiczowa, a pioneer of ethnography in Poland.

== Honours and awards ==
Silver Cross of Virtuti Militari
Cross of Independence with Swords
Cross of Valour – twice
Order of Polonia Restituta
Order of the Cross of the Eagle, First Class (Estonia, 1938)

== See also ==
- Prometheism

Political offices
Preceded by Aleksander Prystor	Prime Minister of Poland; 1933–1934	Succeeded by Leon Kozlowski
