= Education in the Polish People's Republic =

Education in the Polish People's Republic in years of its existence was controlled by the communist state, which provided primary schools, secondary schools, vocational education and universities. Education in communist Poland was compulsory from age 7 to 15.

== Background ==
Education in the Second Polish Republic, which existed prior World War II was limited. According to official statistics of the time, the number of children who did not attend school in the 1935-1936 school year was 600,000 out of a total of 5,143,100 children of school age. In the 1937-1938 year only 127,100 finished seventh grade, and only 36,400 of these students were from rural areas. All secondary schools, even public ones, charged high tuition fees that many Poles simply could not afford. This meant that only 11.1% of schoolchildren would go on past primary school.

When the communist government came to power following the World War II, it reformed the education system. In May, 1945, the Ministry of Education drew up a plan outlining an educational system based on several principles: that education in Poland be free, uniform, public and compulsory. It was to be free in that tuition fees would be abolished and a system of scholarships, dormitories and government assistance be put into place ensuring that every child had equal access to education. It was to be uniform in that the same curriculum be taught at every school and that rural institutions be brought up to the same standard as urban ones. It was to be public in that the state would control every educational institution. To be compulsory meant that parents or legal guardians could be imprisoned if the children in their care did not attend school. The plan also stated that the curriculum had to be so modelled that children would gain a wide base of knowledge, learn to think for themselves, and leave school with the scientific world outlook.

Though the plan was formulated in 1945, it was not until 1947 that it would be largely put into practice. The acquisition of new territory and the destruction wreaked on the country during the war meant that schools had to be built or rebuilt, and new teachers had to be trained.

The Nazi and Soviet massacre of the prewar Polish intelligentsia, and the emigration of many other intellectuals and skilled people, had left Poland severely educationally lacking. As a result, the Communist program of free and compulsory school education for all, and the establishment of new free universities, received much support. Universities from the lost eastern territories were evacuated to the new western territories: from Wilno to Toruń and from Lwów to Wrocław. Many new universities were founded, including the famous Film University of Łódź.

The Communists thus took the opportunity to create a new Polish educated class, taught in an educational system which they controlled; history as well as other sciences had to follow Marxist view as well as be subject to political censorship. In 1948, the curriculum was altered to make communist ideology and theory more central. In addition, various sciences were affected by the communist ideology. Many western books and publications were decreed illegal and possession of any of them could result in fines or even imprisonment. History especially was changed to minimize the role of the events that could undermine the position of the communist government; for example, the Polish-Soviet War of 1919-1921 was completely omitted from some history books, and the members of the Polish Government in Exile, like Władysław Sikorski, were portrayed as traitors. The science of economics was also deeply affected, as communist ideology stressed that central planning was always superior to capitalism, and banned works like those of János Kornai on the shortage economy. These acts of censorship would now be considered illegal. Between 1951 and 1953 a large number of pre-war reactionary professors was dismissed from the universities. Among them were Maria and Stanisław Ossowski, Władysław Tatarkiewicz, Izydora Dąmbska and many of the most prominent Polish scientists of the epoch. The control over art and artists was deepened and with time the Socialist Realism became the only movement that was accepted by the authorities. After 1949 most of works of art presented to the public had to be in line with the voice of the Party and present its propaganda.

== Primary and secondary education ==
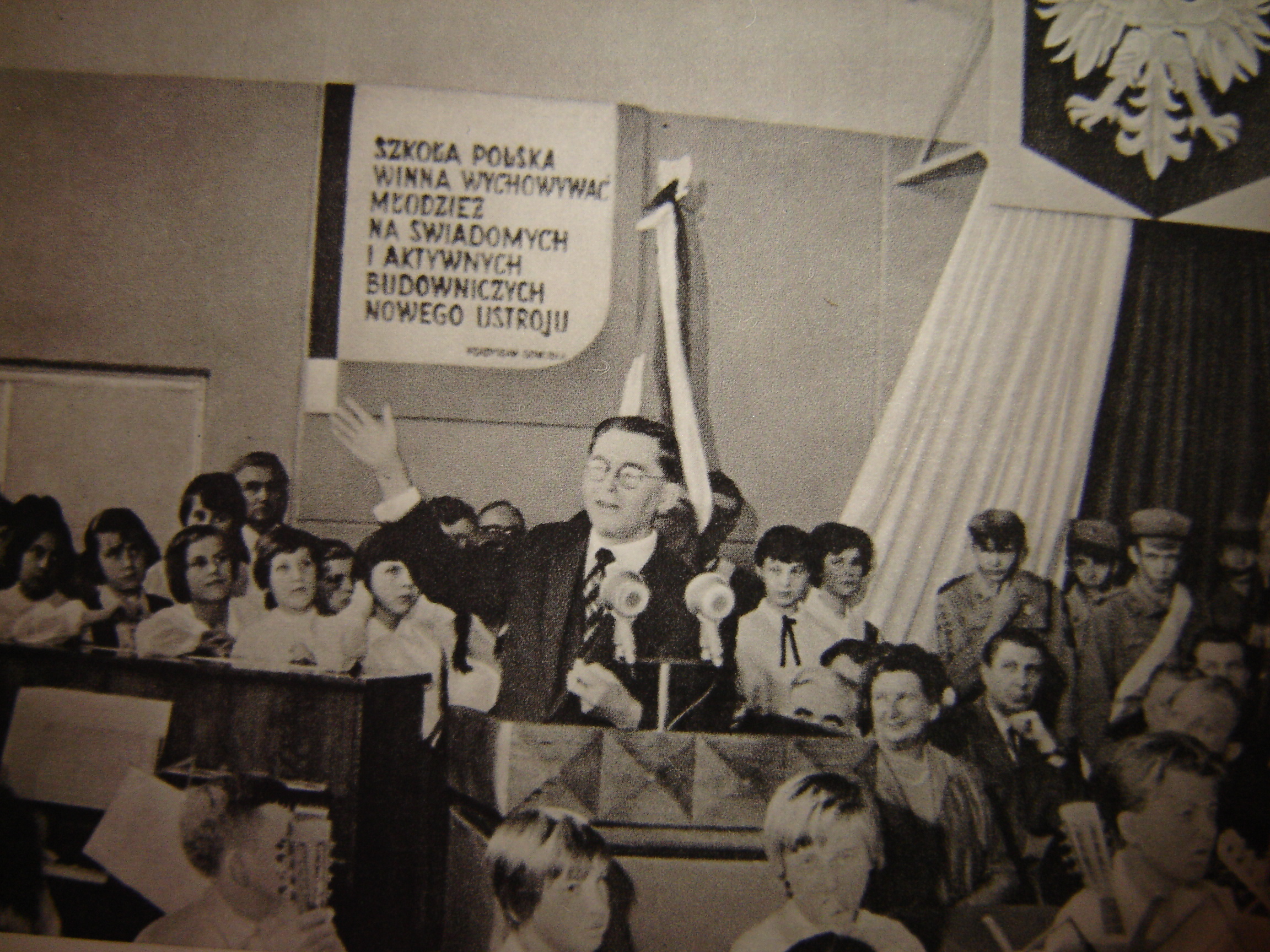
Aleksander Zawadzki, Chairman of the Council of State, opening a new primary school

Schools were standardized into seven-year primary schools and four-year secondary schools. A large scale campaign to build hundreds of new secondary schools in rural villages, inner city areas, and on the outskirts of towns was also initiated. It was hoped that this would eliminate the educational privilege richer Poles enjoyed and make the system fairer for everyone.

By the 1950s, rapid urbanization and the associated internal migration meant that fewer children were enrolling in rural schools. The 1950s also marked a massive surge in the number of teachers. In the 1948-1949 school year, there were 79,319 teachers, but by 1962-1963 there were 156,193. Due largely to new universities being constructed around the country, these teachers were the most highly trained the Poles had ever experienced.

In order to be able to admit all children to the seven-year schools outlined in 1948, a campaign to expand the school network was undertaken. So many new schools were built (4,834 new classrooms in 1956 alone) that the government could, and indeed did, pass a law mandating the maximum distance between a child's home and their school. For students in grades one to four a school had to be within 3 kilometers of their home, and for students in grades five to seven, within 4 kilometers of their home.

In 1956, a detailed study by the Central Statistical Office declared that every single mentally and physically healthy Polish child received an education. Special schools were set up for deaf, mute or blind children. Altogether, up to 5,650,000 students completed primary schooling in Poland between 1945 and 1963.

On July 15 1961, the Sejm (Polish parliament) passed an act on the development of the educational system. It introduced two years of compulsory agricultural or vocational training, officially secularized all schools and raised the minimum age of graduation from 14 to 15. This reform was gradually implemented from 1962 to 1966.

== Vocational education ==
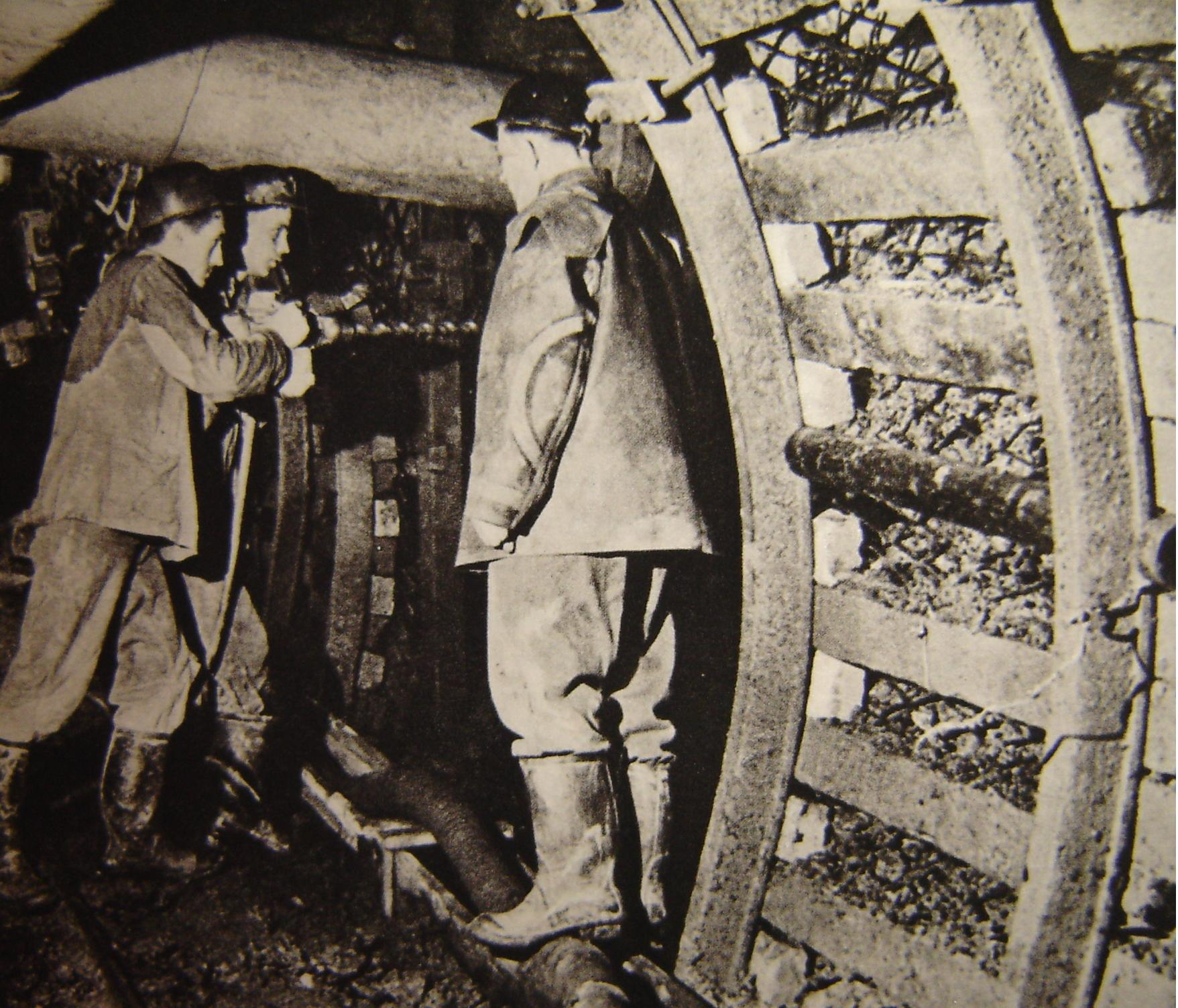
Students at the Basic Mining School at Pszów are shown around an experimental mine

In the 1920s and 1930s, vocational education did exist on a relatively adequate scale, and a fairly large number of students (110,000 in 1937-1938) attended vocational institutions. However, the standard of education was very low. Many did not have textbooks, and almost none could offer any sort of environment for students to put into practice what they had learned. Lack of widespread industrialization in Poland at the time meant that many graduates were not guaranteed a job, and only 4.1% attended complete secondary trade schools that allowed them to move on to the university level.

As rapid industrialization was one of the key communist priorities, so too were the vocational schools improved. The Ministries of Education and Industry began to set up new schools. By 1946-1947, there were 60,000 more students enrolled in vocational institutes than in 1937-1938. Standardized textbooks were published on a large scale, the required number of hours of theory was raised to 18, and a number of new subjects based on more modern technological skills were introduced.

In 1949, the Central Agency for Vocational Training was set up to sculpt the curriculum so that the demands of Poland's planned economy could be met. Existing vocational schools were converted into preparatory vocational schools, basic trade schools that trained skilled labour and vocational secondary schools. Its task completed, the Agency was absorbed into the Ministry of Education in 1956. In the same year the first two-year agricultural vocational schools were built, which offered training for rural students who wished to be farmers. By 1962, there were three thousand of these, with 100,000 students officially enrolled.

The number of students in vocational institutions grew rapidly from the 1930s to the 1960s, with 207,529 students in 1937/1938 and 1,371,400 in 1963/1964.

== University ==
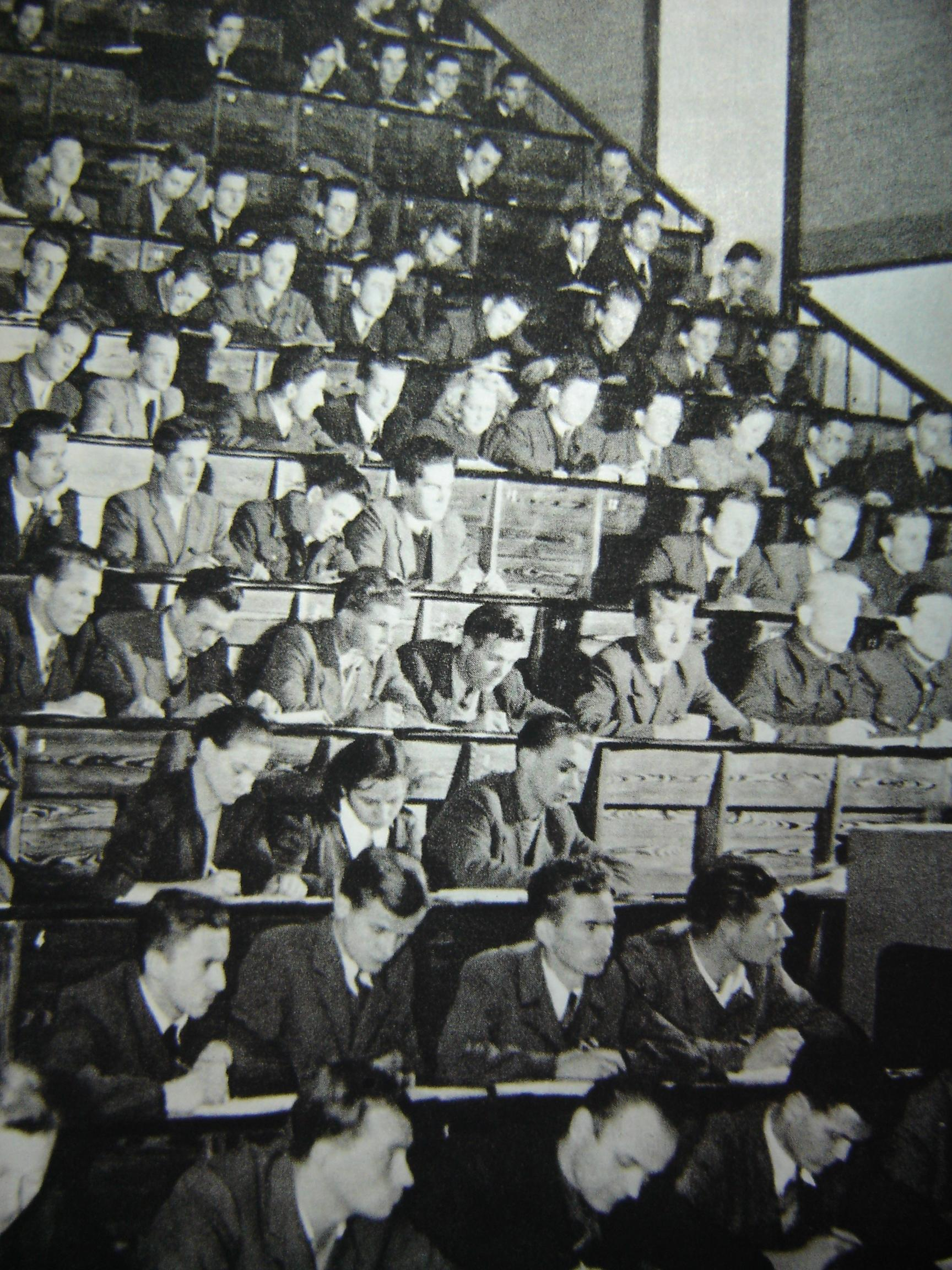
Students at a university

As almost all of Poland's universities, before World War II, were located in major cities, they were completely destroyed during the war. Poland's German occupiers took large collections of textbooks and equipment from Polish universities to Germany and closed the facilities. Many of them were destroyed by heavy bombing, and 60% of Warsaw University was destroyed during the 1944 uprising. However, post-secondary education continued in Poland (see underground education in Poland during World War II).

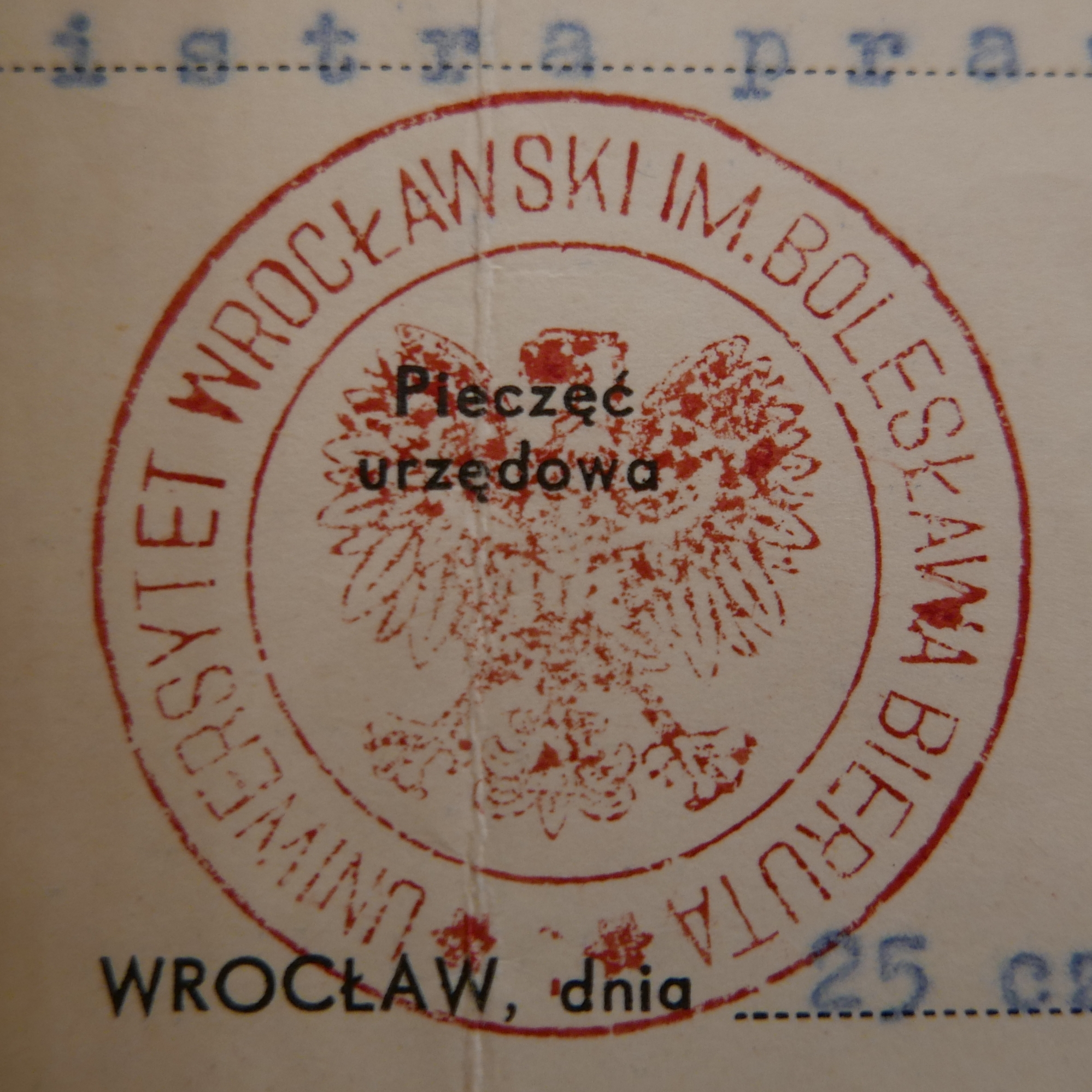
The University of Wrocław was named after the President of Poland Bolesław Bierut in 1952. Some of its faculty came from the abolished Jan Kazimierz University in Lviv.

Following the war, the universities were rebuilt and restructured according to a communist model, i.e. medical, agricultural, economical, engineering and sport faculties became colleges. Theological faculties were removed from state universities, two theological colleges were created in Warsaw. The new government, as part of a plan to strengthen the Polish economy, created many new faculties across the country, including dairying, fishing, textiles, chemistry and mechanisation of agriculture, as well as new courses for Marxist economics. Many new universities were also constructed. By 1963 the number of universities and colleges in Poland was almost double what it had been in 1938 (73 and 32, respectively). Among these new colleges were ten medical schools, a type of institution unknown in prewar Poland.

Poland had a considerable number of day students in its universities, an estimated 57.2 students per 10,000 people in 1964, compared to 14.4 in 1938. This put it at fifth place in the Eastern Bloc (behind the Soviet Union, Bulgaria, Czechoslovakia and Yugoslavia) and in relation to the capitalist world, behind the United States, Canada, Japan and Australia.

After the war people coming from workers' or farmers' families were preferred. The system was cancelled around 1956. Later a system similar to the affirmative action was implemented, where people coming from workers' or farmers' families (pochodzenie robotniczo-chłopskie) were given preferential treatment in the university admission, usually in the form of extra points in the recruitment process given for the social class (punkty za pochodzenie). This was partially motivated by the Communists seeing the traditional intelligentsia as hostile, and trying to build a new educated class more friendly towards them. All kinds of affirmative action were abolished after the fall of communism. After 1968 student protests, students had to apply for political certificates, as the result many of them lost their scholarships.

== See also ==
- Education in Poland
- Numerus clausus
