= Baroque architecture =

16th–18th-century European architectural style

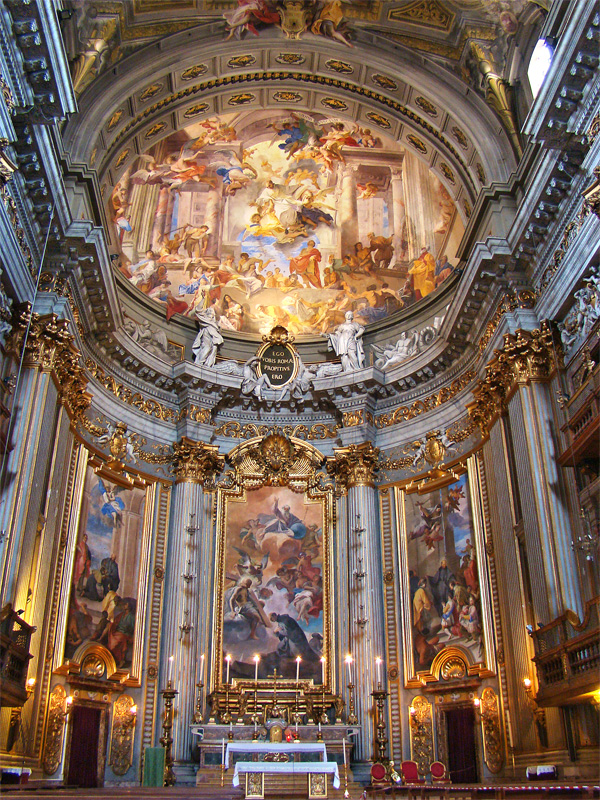
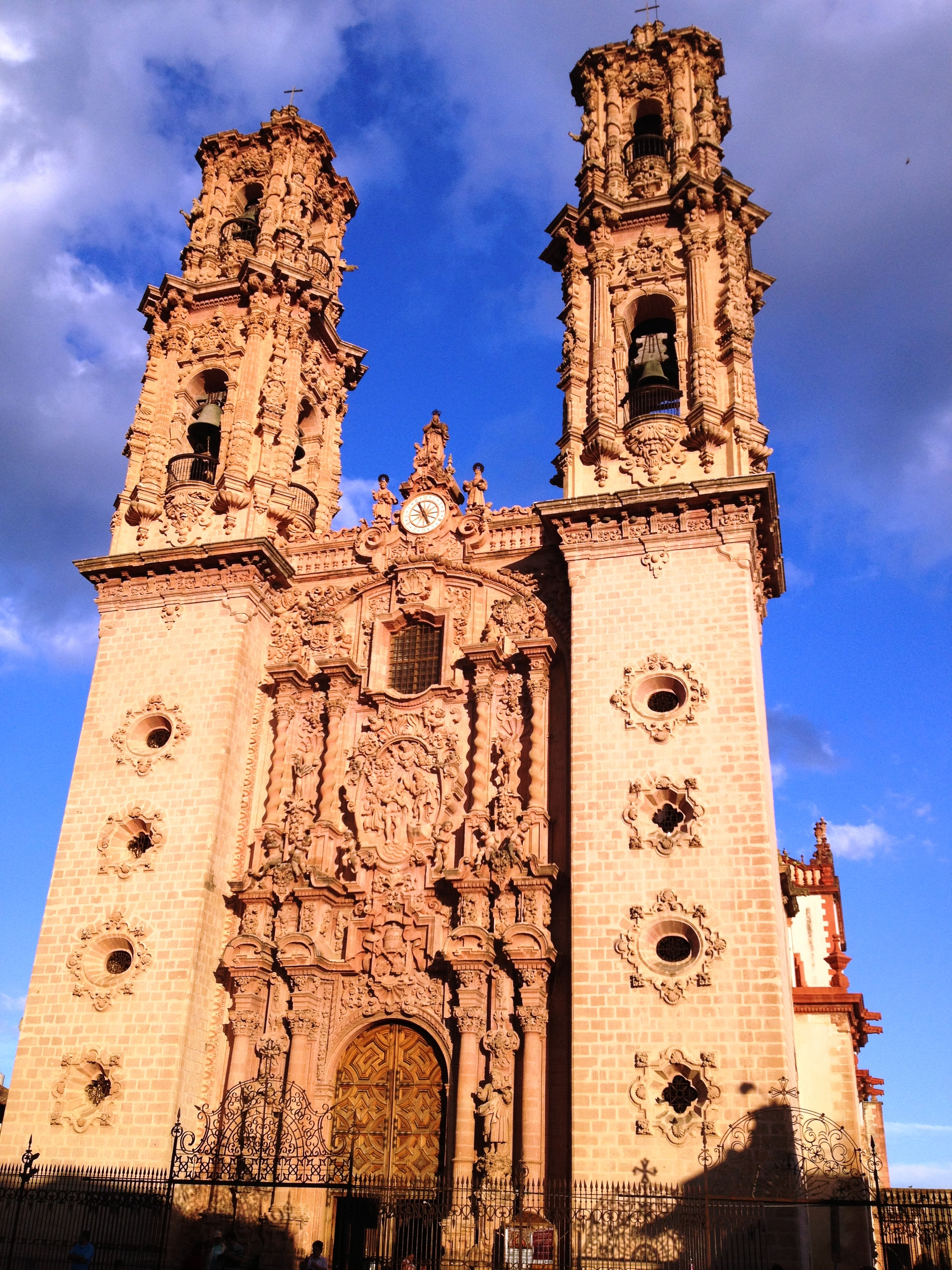
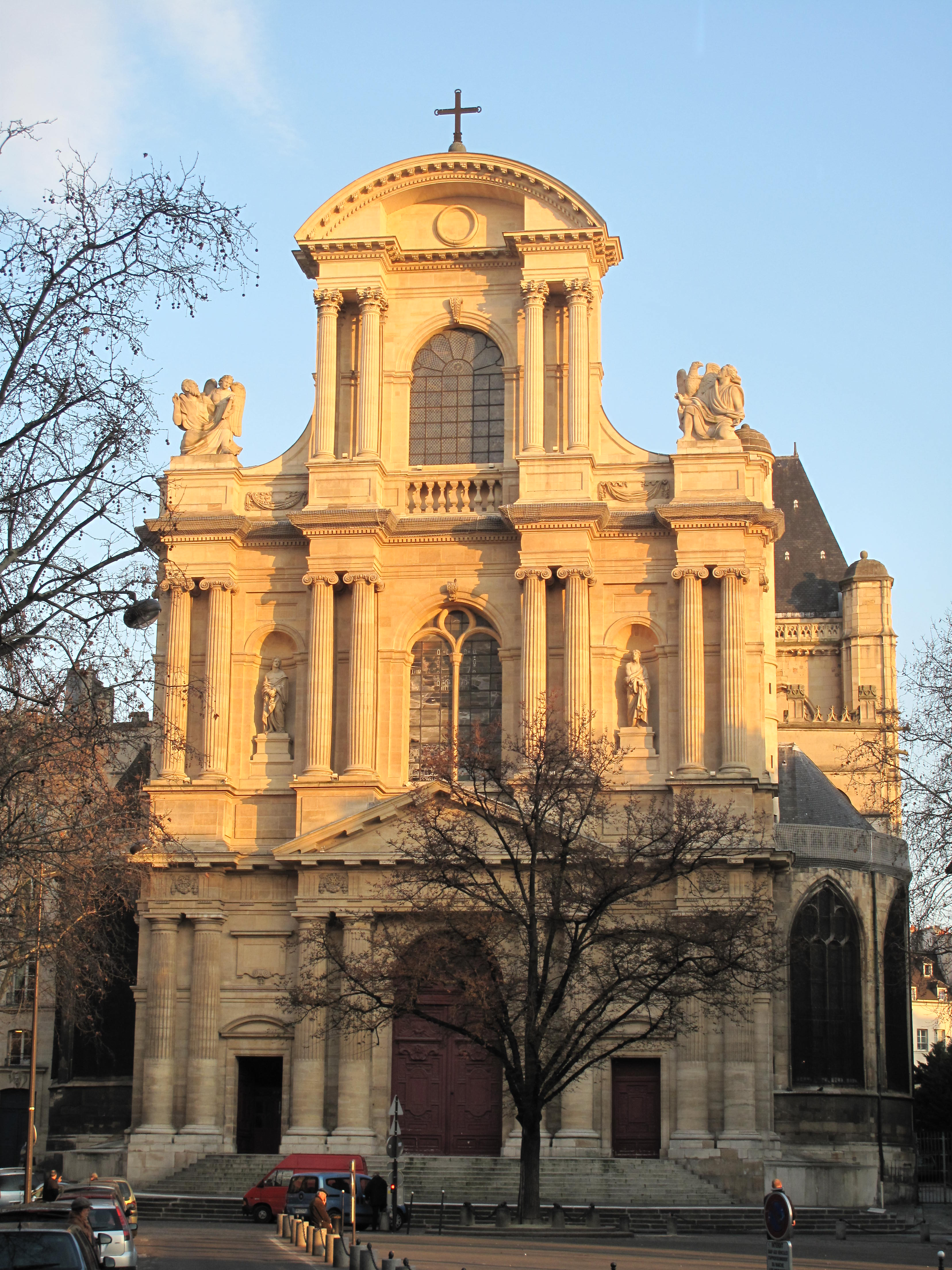
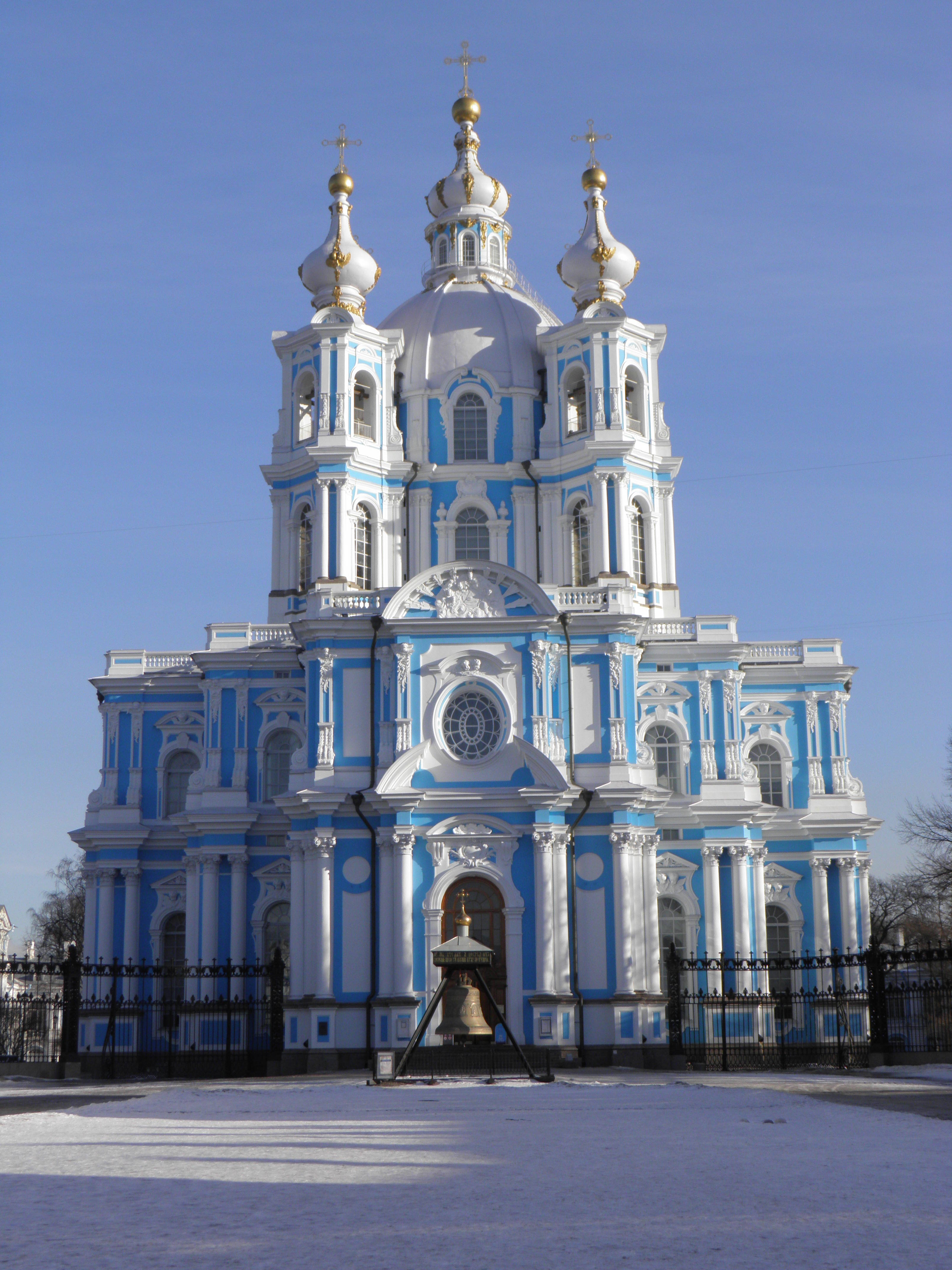
- Interior of the Church of Saint Ignatius of Loyola, Rome Facade of the Church of Santa Prisca de Taxco Facade of the Saint-Gervais-Saint-Protais, Paris Facade of the Smolny Convent, Saint Petersburg
- Years active: Late 16th–18th centuries
- Location: Europe and Latin America

Baroque architecture is a highly decorative and theatrical style which appeared in Italy in the late 16th century and gradually spread across Europe. It was originally introduced by the Catholic Church, particularly the Jesuits, as a means to combat the Reformation and the Protestant church with a new architecture that inspired astonishment, reverence and awe. It reached its peak in the High Baroque (1625–1675), when it was used in churches and palaces in Italy, Spain, Portugal, France, Bavaria and Austria. In the Late Baroque period (1675–1750), it reached as far as Russia, the Ottoman Empire and the Spanish and Portuguese colonies in Latin America. In about 1730, an even more elaborately decorative variant called Rococo appeared and flourished in Central Europe.

Baroque architects took the basic elements of Renaissance architecture, including domes and colonnades, and made them higher, grander, more decorated, and more dramatic. The interior effects were often achieved with the use of quadratura (i.e. trompe-l'œil painting combined with sculpture): the eye is drawn upward, giving the illusion that one is looking into the heavens. Clusters of sculpted angels and painted figures crowd the ceiling. Light was also used for dramatic effect; it streamed down from cupolas, and was reflected from an abundance of gilding. Twisted columns were also often used, to give an illusion of upwards motion, and cartouches and other decorative elements occupied every available space. In Baroque palaces, grand stairways became a central element.

The Early Baroque (1584–1625) was largely dominated by the work of Roman architects, notably the Church of the Gesù by Giacomo della Porta (consecrated 1584) façade and colonnade of St. Peter's Basilica by Carlo Maderno (completed 1612) and the lavish Barberini Palace interiors by Pietro da Cortona (1633–1639), and Santa Susanna (1603), by Carlo Maderno. In France, the Luxembourg Palace (1615–45) built by Salomon de Brosse for Marie de' Medici was an early example of the style.

The High Baroque (1625–1675) produced major works in Rome by Pietro da Cortona, including the (Church of Santi Luca e Martina) (1635–50); by Francesco Borromini (San Carlo alle Quattro Fontane (1634–1646)); and by Gian Lorenzo Bernini (The colonnade of St. Peter's Square) (1656–57). In Venice, High Baroque works included Santa Maria della Salute by Baldassare Longhena. Examples in France included the Pavillon de l’Horloge of the Louvre Palace by Jacques Lemercier (1624–1645), the Chapel of the Sorbonne by Jacques Lemercier (1626–35) and the Château de Maisons by François Mansart (1630–1651).

The Late Baroque (1675–1750) saw the style spread to all parts of Europe, and to the colonies of Spain and Portugal in the New World. National styles became more varied and distinct. The Late Baroque in France, under Louis XIV, was more ordered and classical; examples included the Hall of Mirrors of the Palace of Versailles and the dome of Les Invalides. An especially ornate variant, appeared in the early 18th century; it was first called Rocaille in French, later Rococo in France and Central Europe. The sculpted and painted decoration covered every space on the walls and ceiling. Its most celebrated architect was Balthasar Neumann, noted for the Basilica of the Fourteen Holy Helpers and the Würzburg Residence (1749–51).

== History ==
=== Early Baroque (1584–1625) ===
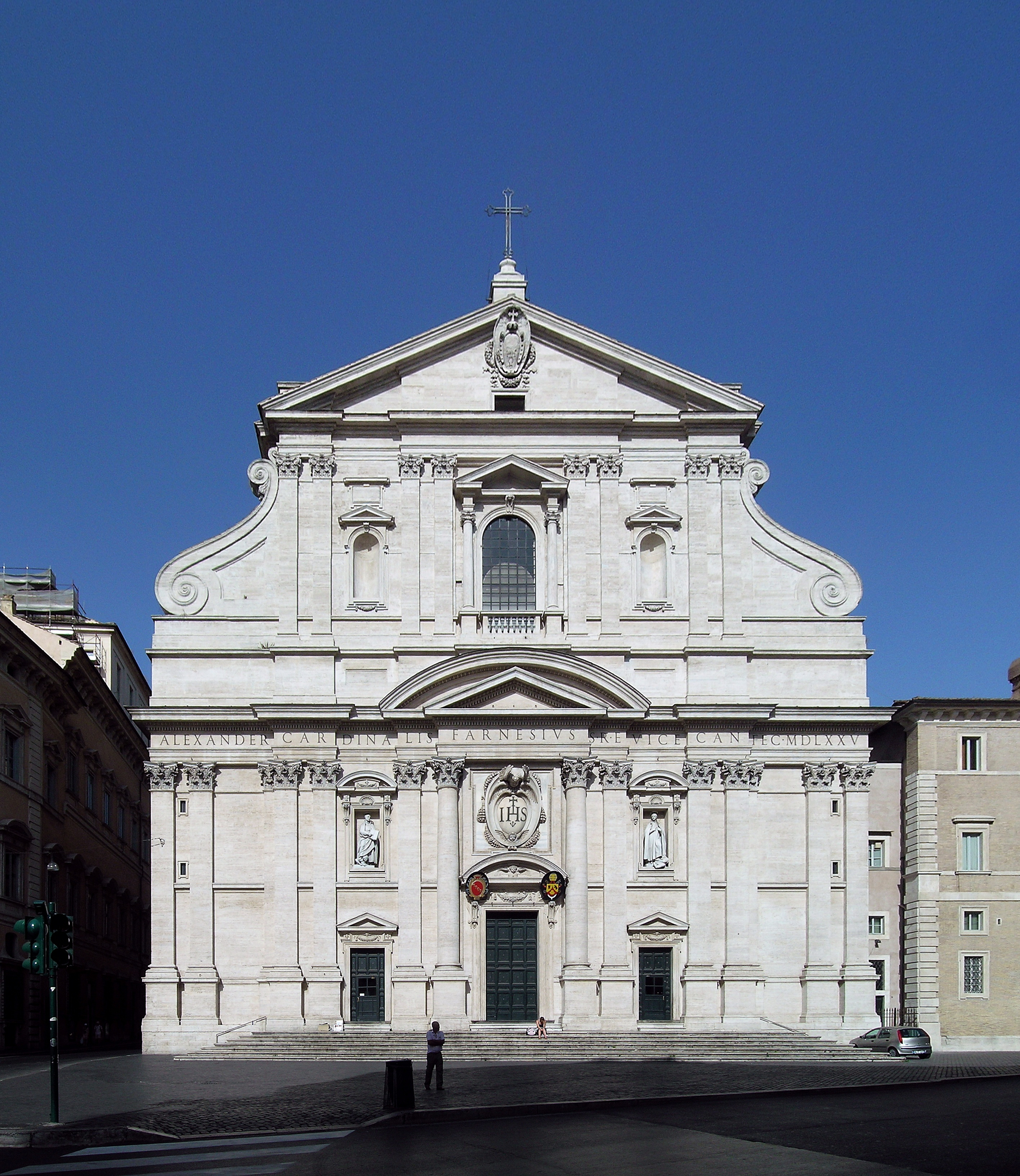
Façade of the Church of the Gesù Rome (consecrated 1584)

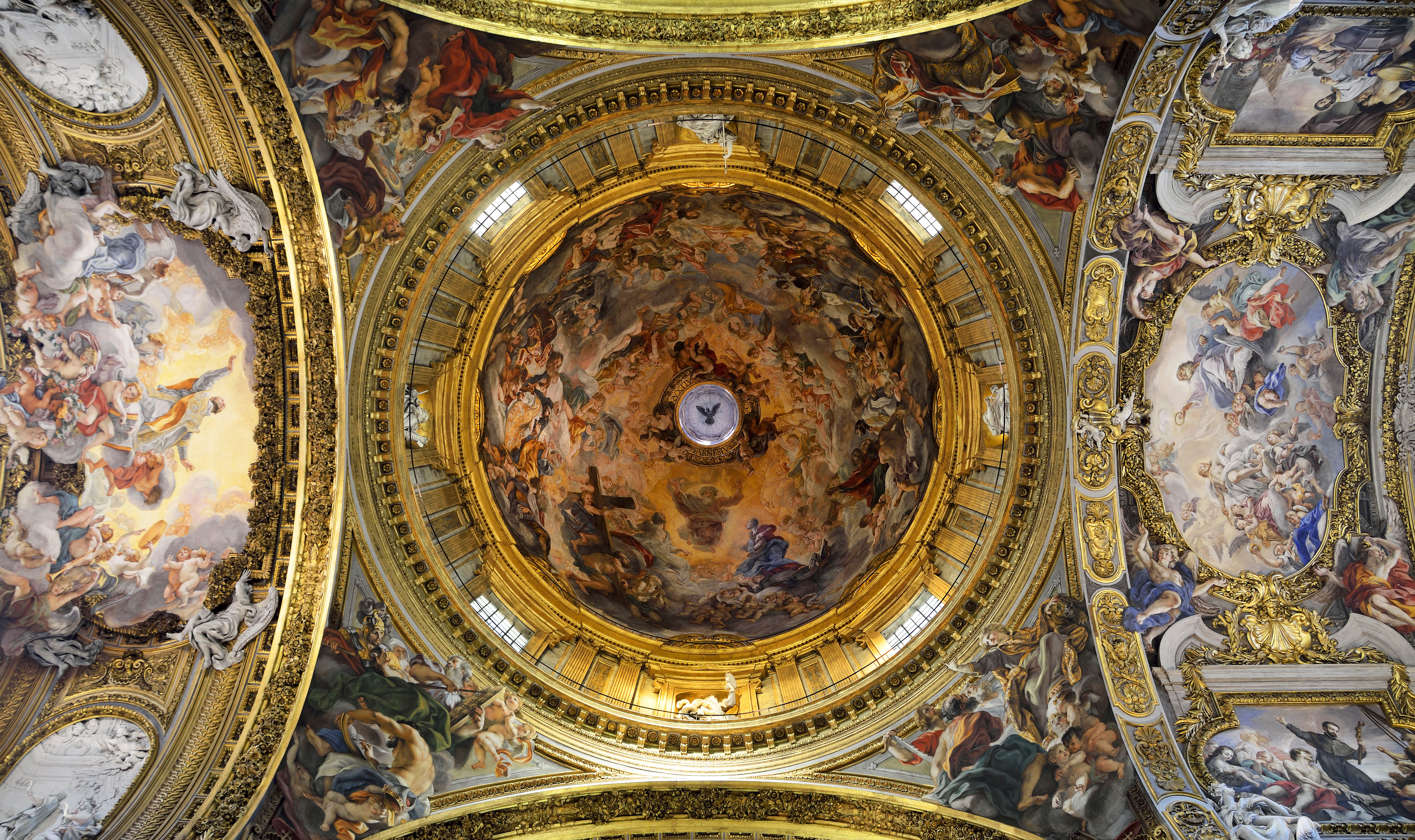
Interior view of dome of the Church of the Gesù by Giacomo Barozzi da Vignola, and Giacomo della Porta

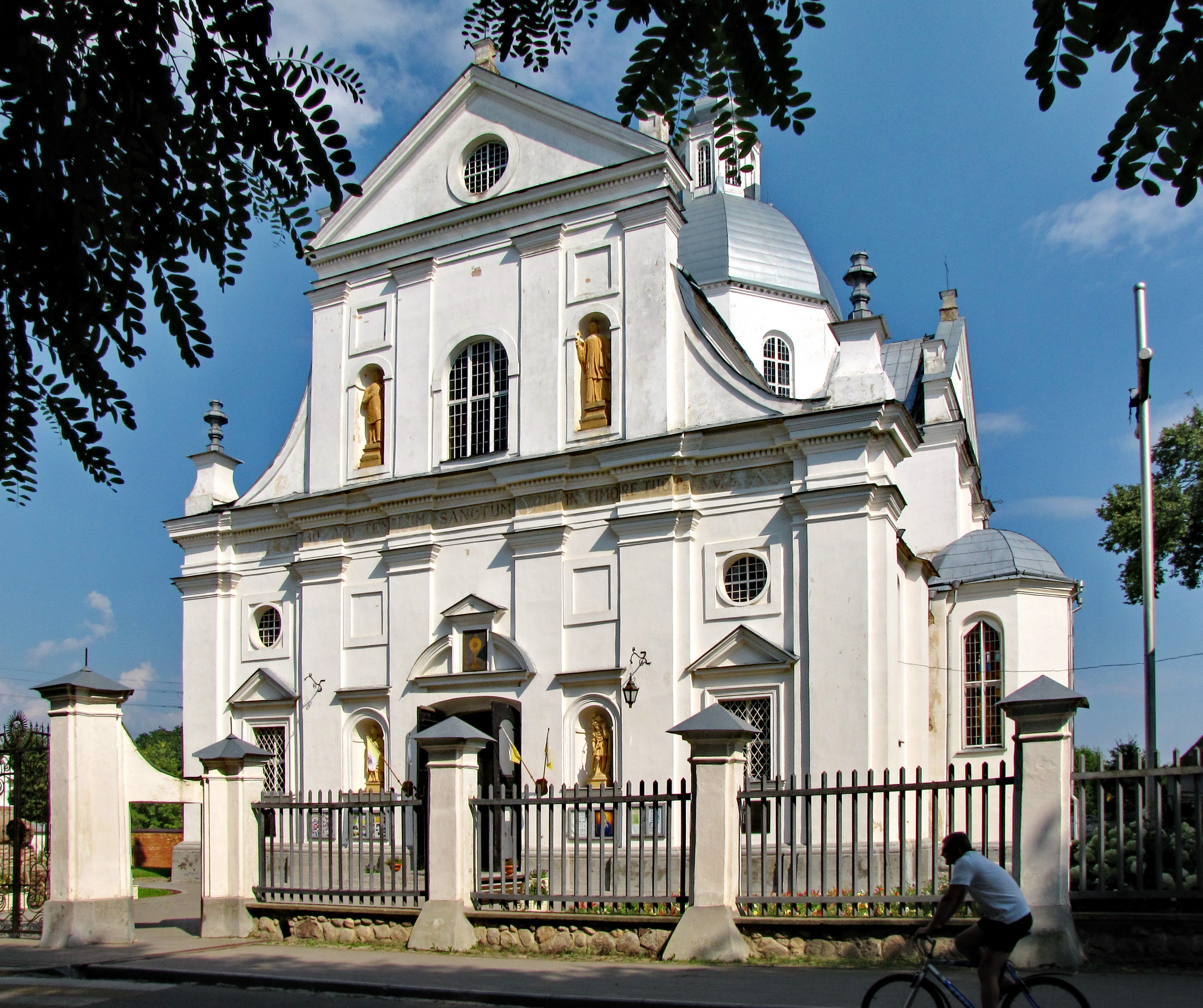
Corpus Christi Church, Grand Duchy of Lithuania (today Nyasvizh, Belarus), 1586 and 1593

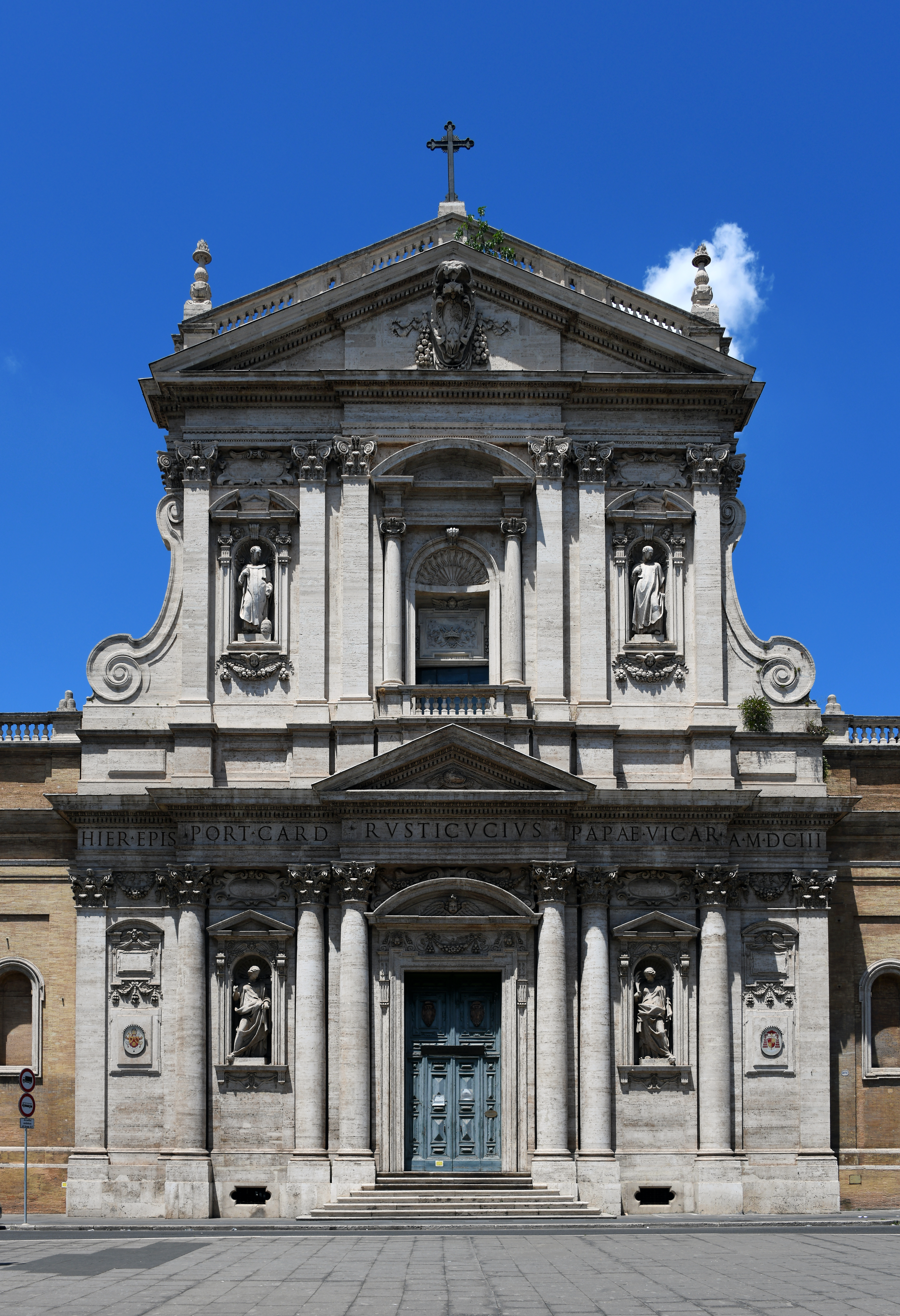
Façade of Santa Susanna, Rome by Carlo Maderno (1603)

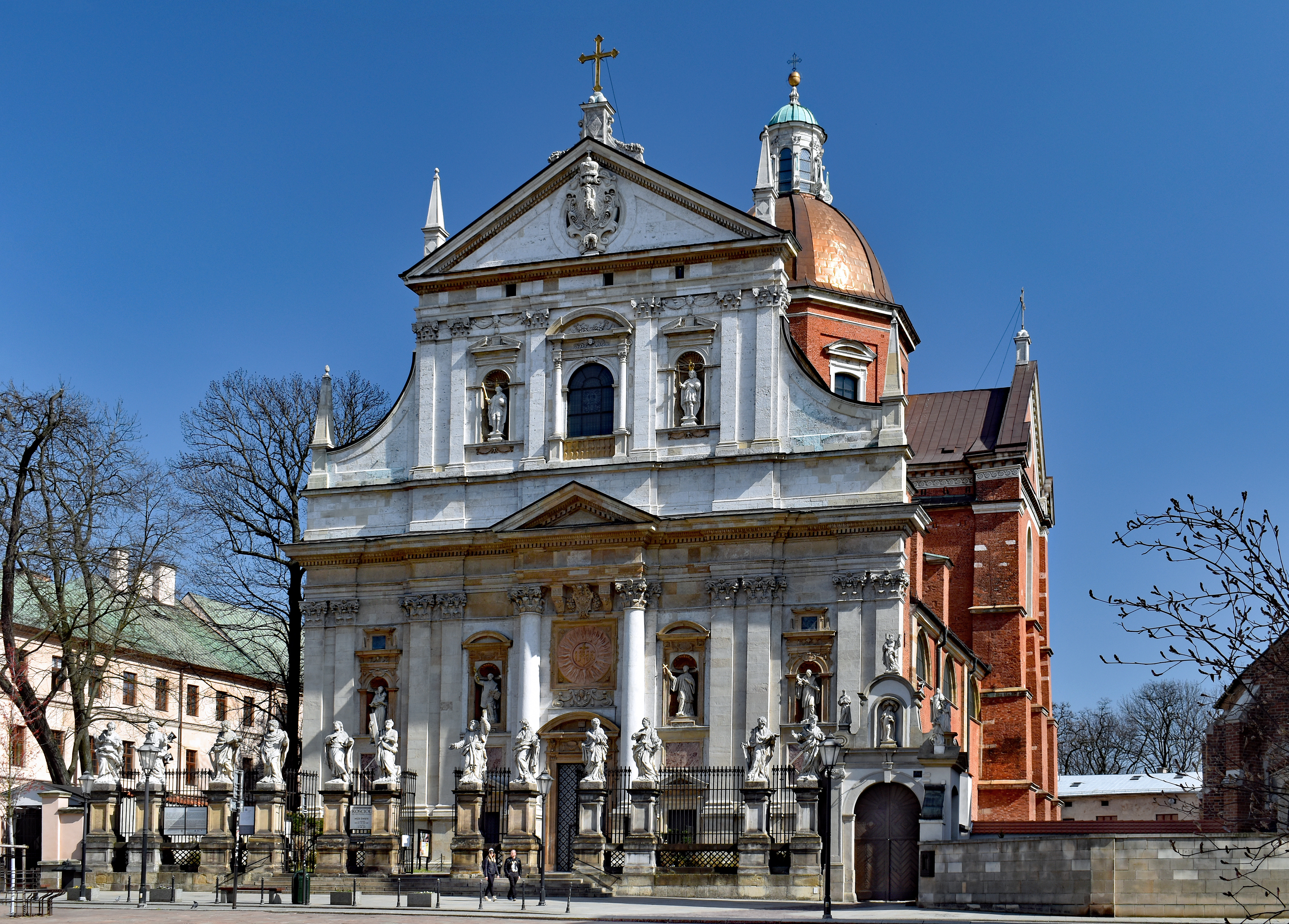
Saints Peter and Paul Church, Kraków, Poland by Giovanni Maria Bernardoni (1597–1619)

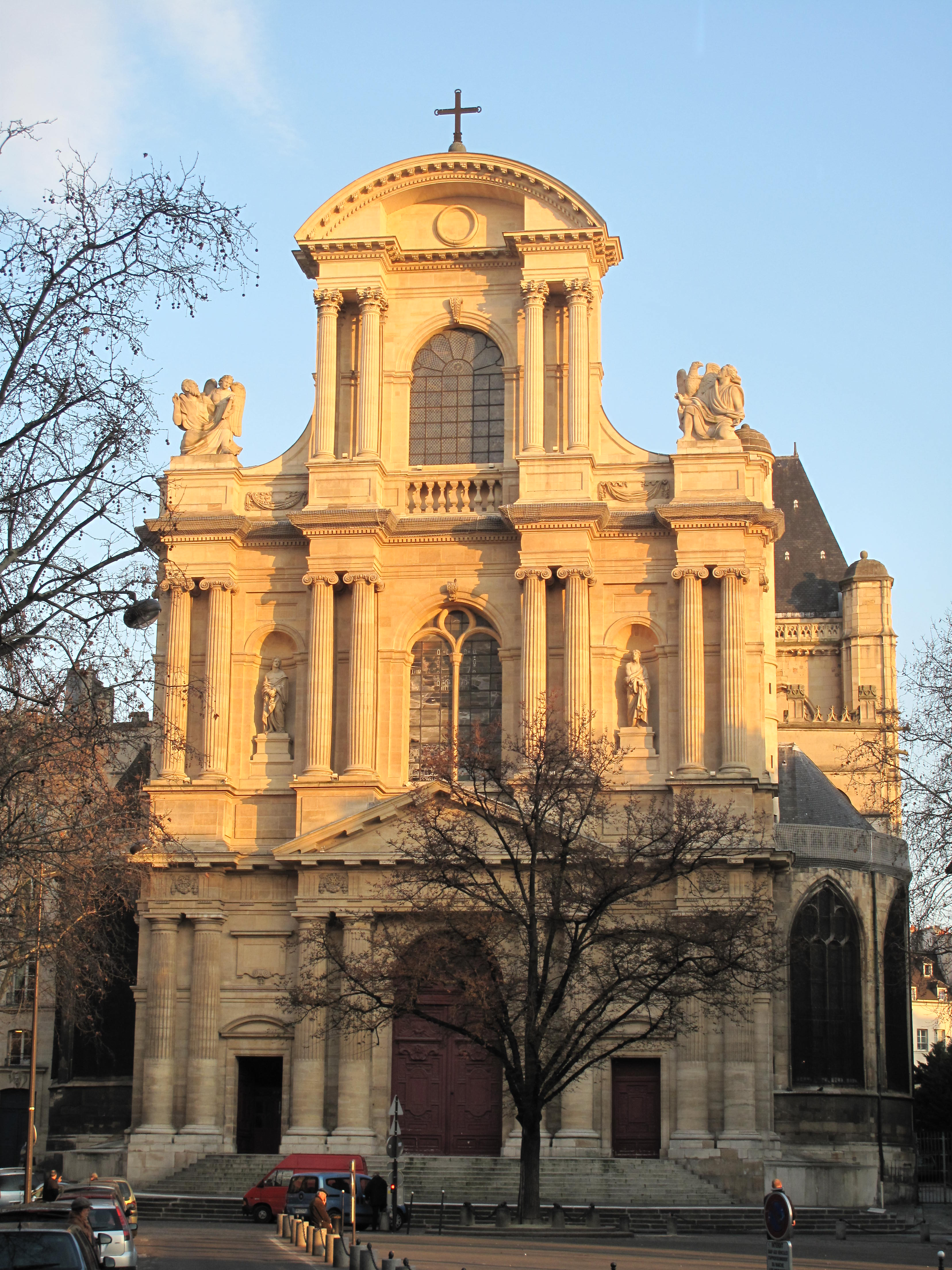
The Church of St-Gervais-et-St-Protais, the first Paris church with a façade in the new Baroque style (1616–20)

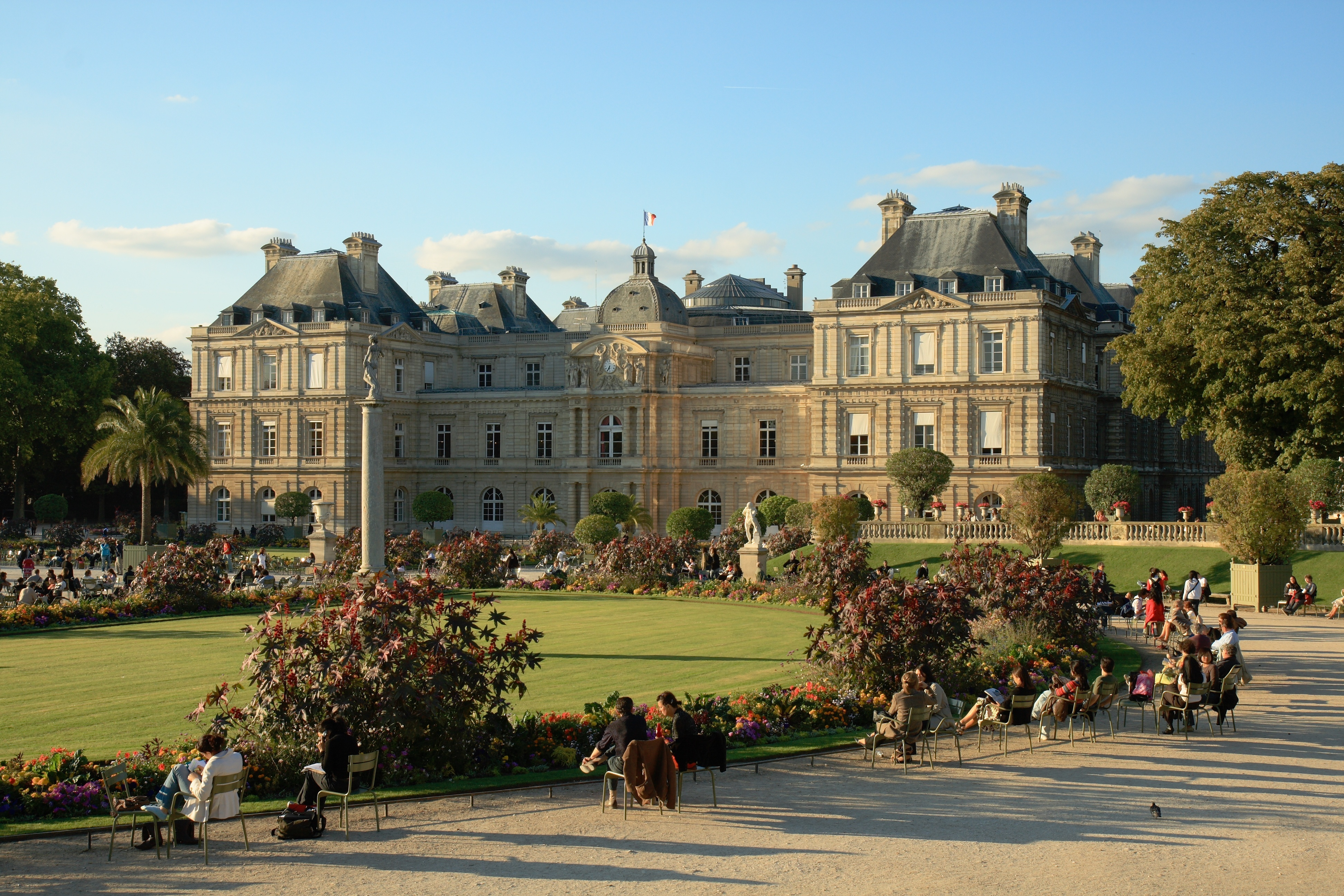
The Luxembourg Palace by Salomon de Brosse (1615–1624)

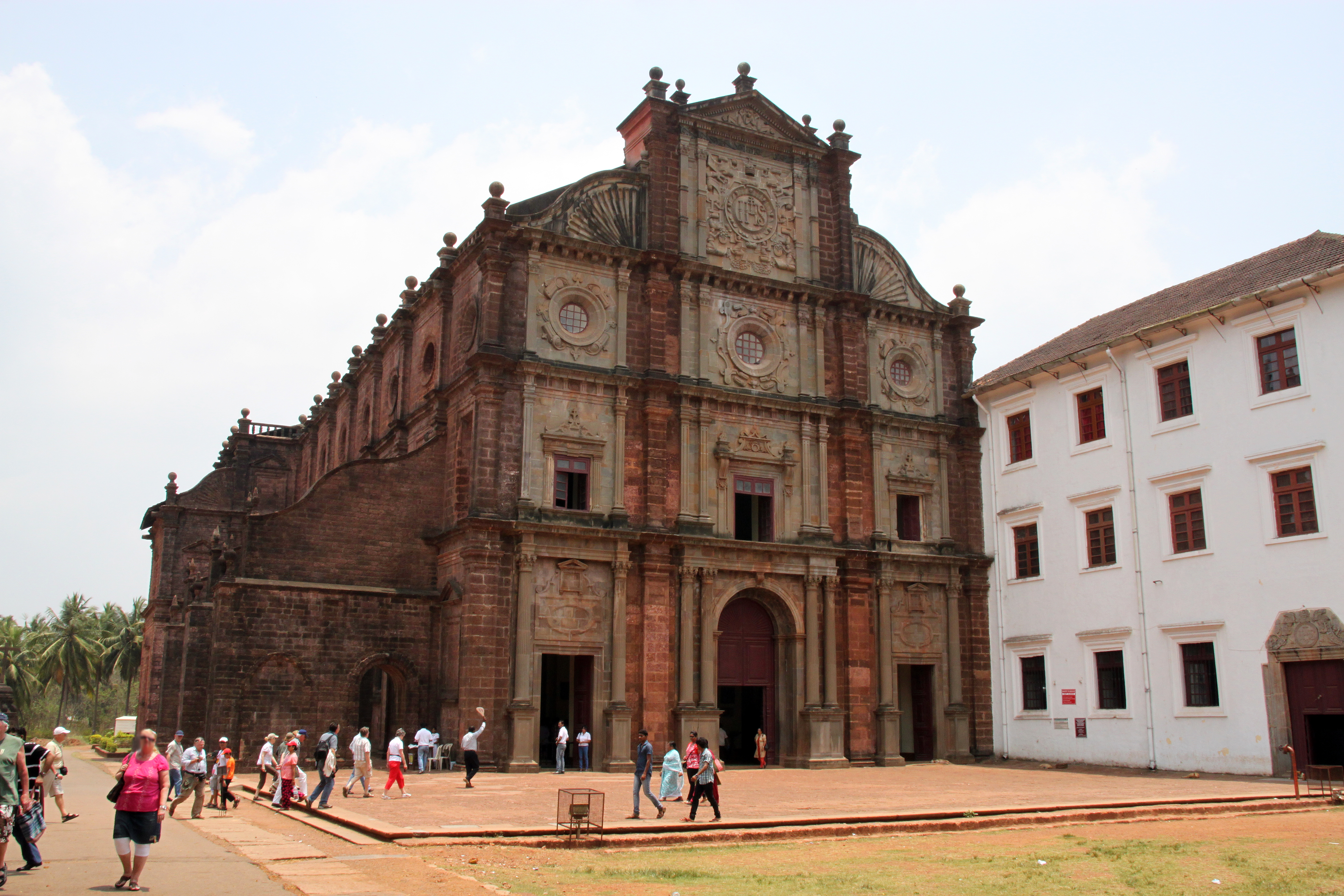
Basilica of Bom Jesus, Goa, India, completed in 1604 AD. It holds the body of St. Francis Xavier.

Baroque architecture first appeared in the late 16th and early 17th century in religious architecture in Rome as a means to counter the popular appeal of the Protestant Reformation. Reacting against the more severe and academic earlier style of earlier churches, it aimed to inspire collective awe and reverence in the congregation. To achieve this, it orchestrated contrast, movement, trompe-l'œil and other dramatic and theatrical effects, most notably quadratura—the use of painted ceilings that gave the illusion that one was looking up directly into heaven. The new style was particularly favored by the new religious orders, including the Theatines and the Jesuits, who built new churches designed to attract and inspire a wide popular audience.

==== Rome ====
One of the first Baroque architects, Carlo Maderno, used Baroque effects of space and perspective in the new façade and colonnade of Saint Peter's Basilica, which was designed to contrast with and complement the gigantic dome built earlier by Michelangelo. Other influential early examples in Rome included the Church of the Gesù by Giacomo della Porta (consecrated 1584), with the first Baroque façade and a highly ornate interior, and Santa Susanna (1603), by Carlo Maderno.

==== Paris ====
The Jesuits soon imported the style to Paris. The Church of St-Gervais-et-St-Protais in Paris (1615–1621) had the first Baroque façade in France, featuring, like the Italian Baroque façades, the three superimposed classical orders. The Italian style of palaces was also imported to Paris by Marie de' Medici for her new residence, the Luxembourg Palace (1615–1624) by architect Salomon de Brosse, and for a new wing of the Château of Blois by François Mansard (1635–38). Nicolas Fouquet, the superintendent of finances for the young King Louis XIV, chose the new style for his château at Vaux-le-Vicomte (1612–1670) by Louis Le Vau. He was later imprisoned by the King because of the extravagant cost of the palace.

==== Southern Netherlands ====
In the Southern Netherlands, the Baroque architecture was introduced by the Catholic Church in the context of the Counter-Reformation and the Eighty Years' War. After the separation of the Netherlands Baroque churches were set up across the country. One of the first architects was Wenceslas Cobergher (1560-1634), who built the Basilica of Our Lady of Scherpenheuvel from 1609 until 1627 and the Church of Saint Augustine, Antwerp. Other churches are for example the St. Charles Borromeo Church, Antwerp (1615-1621) and the St. Walburga Church (Bruges) (1619-1641), both built by Pieter Huyssens. Later, secular buildings, such as the Guildhalls on the Grand-Place in Brussels and several Belfries, were constructed too.

==== Central Europe ====
The first example of early Baroque in Central Europe was the Corpus Christi Church, Nesvizh in the Polish–Lithuanian Commonwealth, built by the Jesuits on the Roman model between 1586 and 1593 in Nieśwież (after 1945 Niasvizh in Belarus). The church also holds a distinction of being the first domed basilica with a Baroque façade in the Commonwealth and Eastern Europe. Another early example in Poland is the Church of Saints Peter and Paul Church, Kraków, built between 1597 and 1619 by the Italian Jesuit architect Giovanni Maria Bernardoni.

=== High Baroque (1625–1675) ===
==== Italy ====
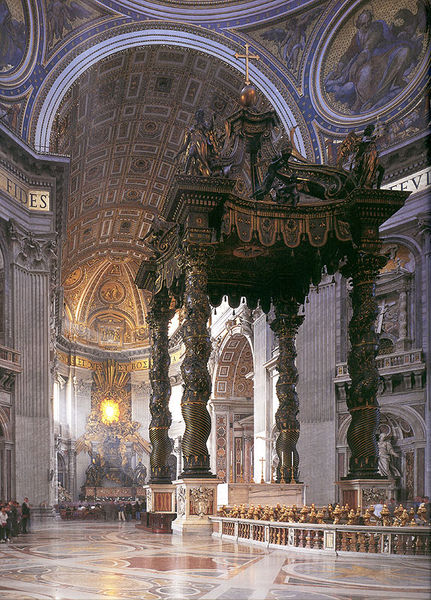
Baldaquin by Bernini in the Basilica of Saint Peter, Rome (1623–34)

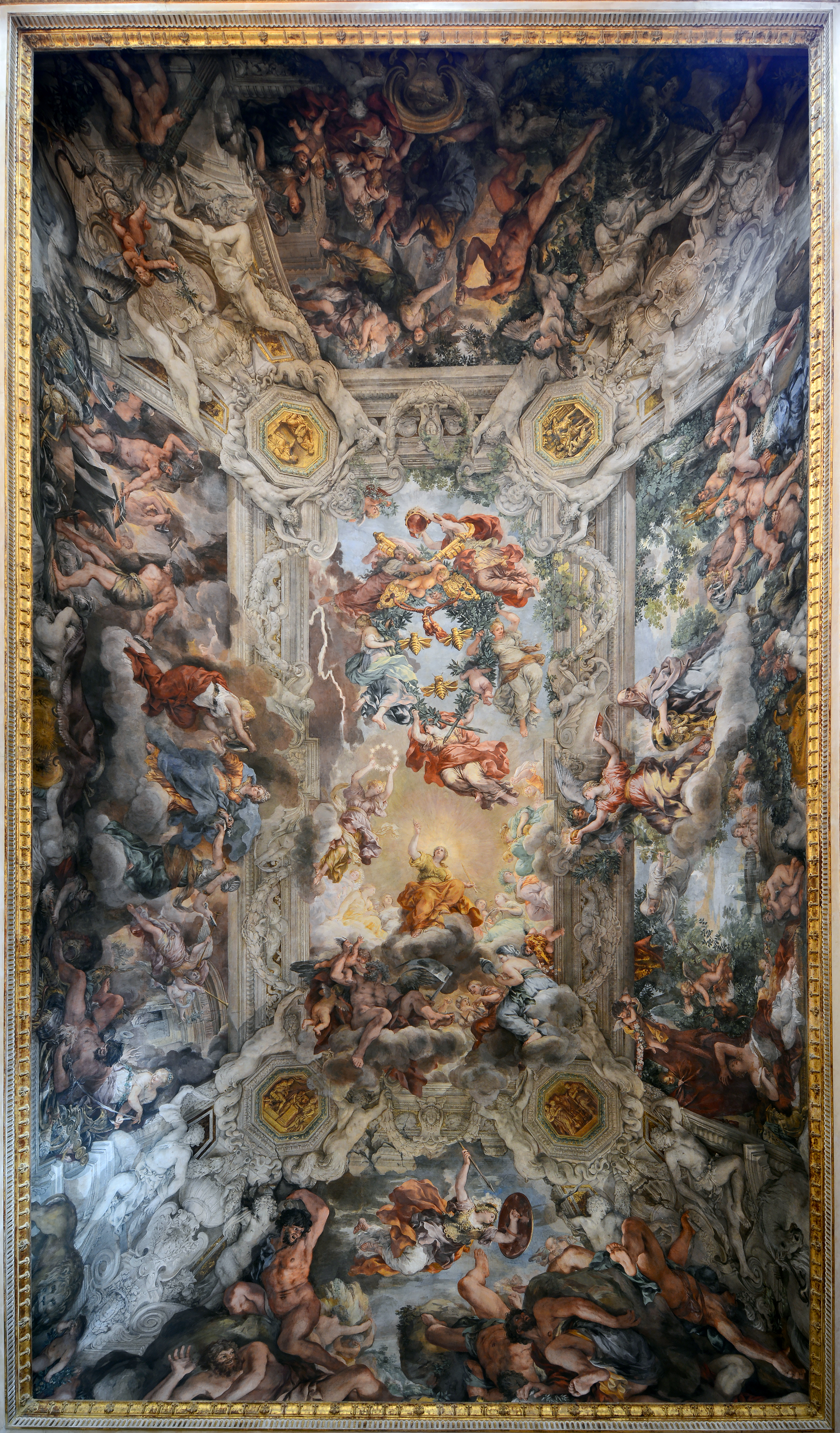
Fresco on ceiling of the grand salon of Barberini Palace in Rome, by Pietro da Cortona (1633–1639)

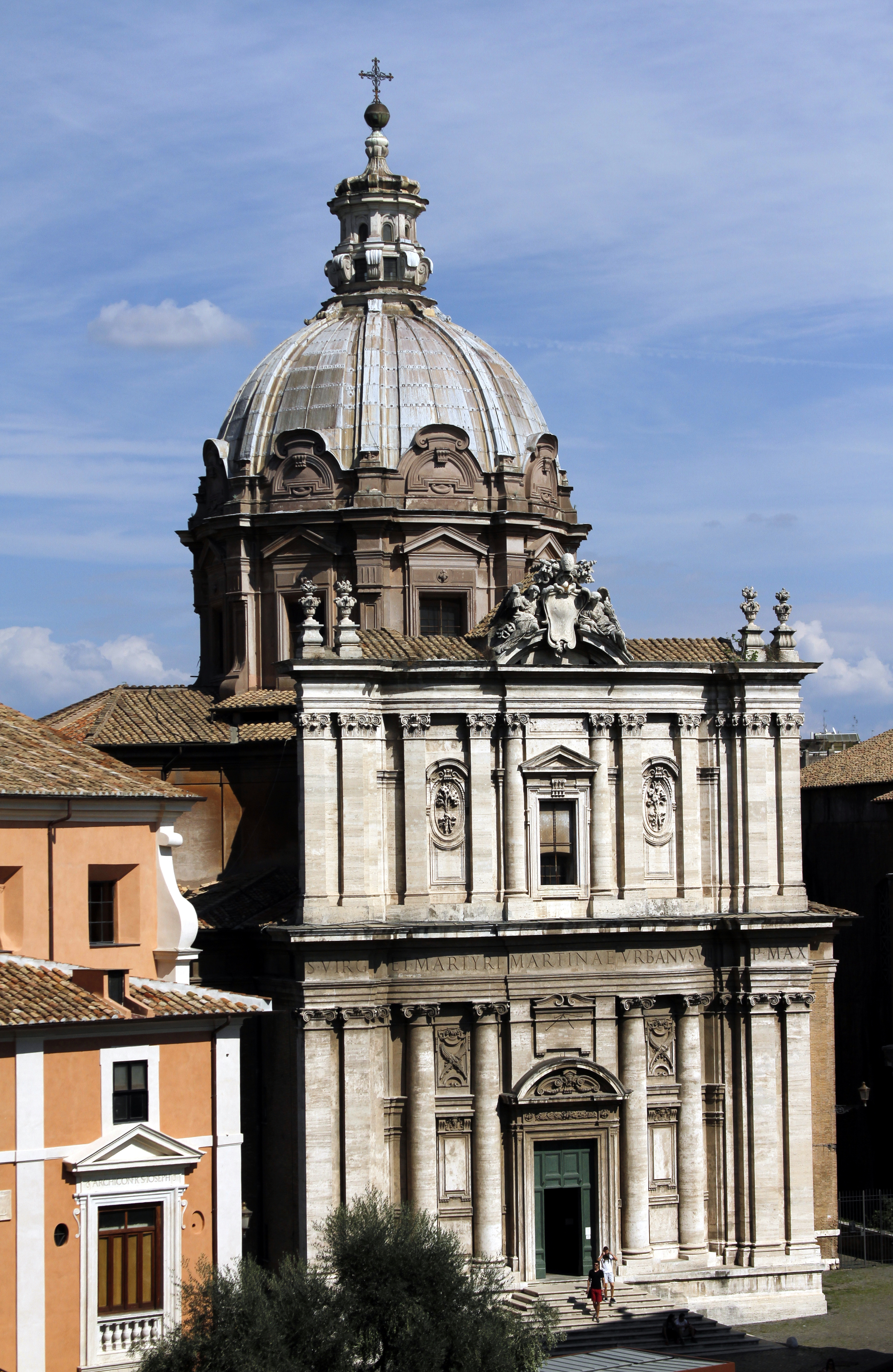
Church of Santi Luca e Martina, in Rome, by Pietro da Cortona (1635–50)

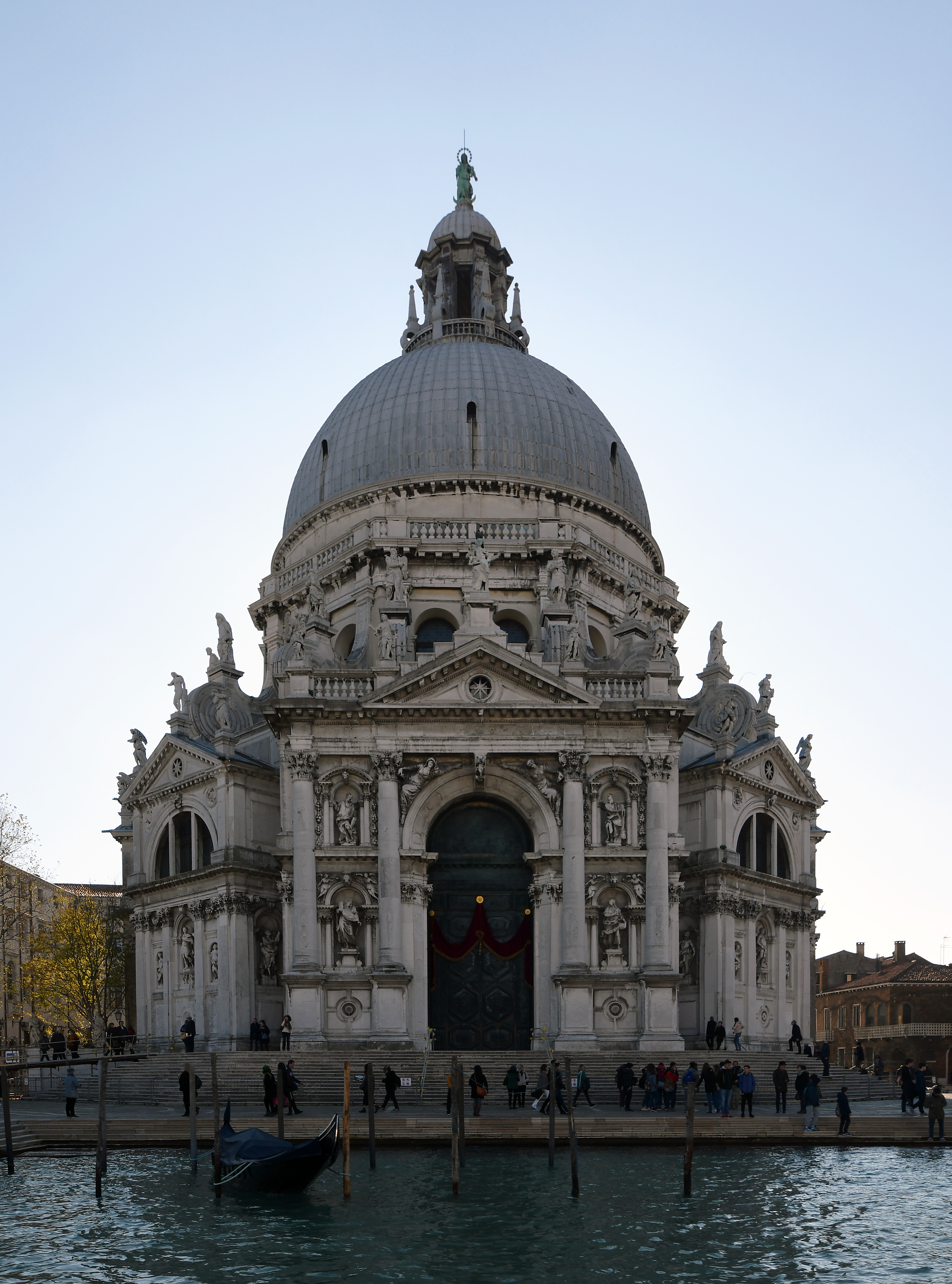
Santa Maria della Salute by Baldassare Longhena in Venice (1630–31).

Pope Urban VIII, who occupied the Papacy from 1623 to 1644, became the most influential patron of the Baroque style. After the death of Carlo Maderno in 1629, Urban named the architect and sculptor Gian Lorenzo Bernini as the chief Papal architect. Bernini created not only Baroque buildings, but also Baroque interiors, squares and fountains, transforming the center of Rome into an enormous theater. Bernini rebuilt the Church of Santa Bibiana and the Church of San Sebastiano al Palatino on the Palatine Hill into Baroque landmarks, planned the Fontana del Tritone in the Piazza Barberini, and created the soaring baldacchino as the centerpiece of St Peter's Basilica.

The High Baroque spread gradually across Italy, beyond Rome. The period saw the construction of Santa Maria della Salute by Baldassare Longhena in Venice (1630–31). Churches were not the only buildings to use the Baroque style. One of the finest monuments of the early Baroque is the Barberini Palace (1626–1629), the residence of the family of Urban VIII, begun by Carlo Maderno, and completed and decorated by Bernini and Francesco Borromini. The outside of the Pope's family residence, was relatively restrained, but the interiors, and especially the immense fresco on the ceiling of the salon, the Allegory of Divine Providence and Barberini Power painted by Pietro da Cortona, are considered masterpieces of Baroque art and decoration. Curving façades and the illusion of movement were a speciality of Francesco Borromini, most notably in San Carlo alle Quattro Fontane (1634–1646), one of the landmarks of the high Baroque. Another important monument of the period was the Church of Santi Luca e Martina in Rome by Pietro da Cortona (1635–50), in the form of a Greek cross with an elegant dome. After the death of Urban VIII and the brief reign of his successor, the Papacy of Pope Alexander VII from 1666 until 1667 saw more construction of Baroque churches, squares and fountains in Rome by Carlo Rainaldi, Bernini and Carlo Fontana.

==== France ====
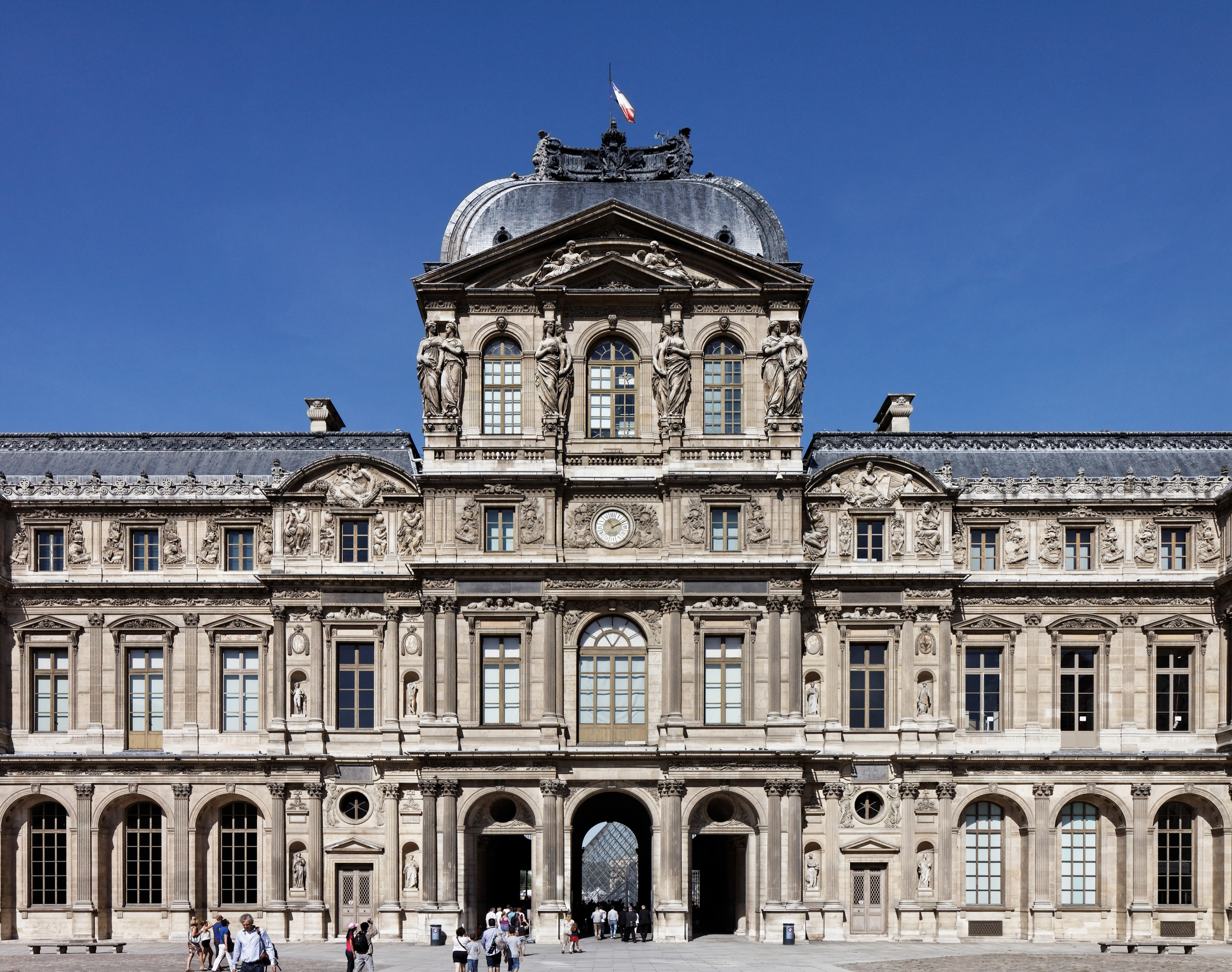
Pavillon de l'Horloge of the Louvre Palace by Jacques Lemercier (1624–1645)

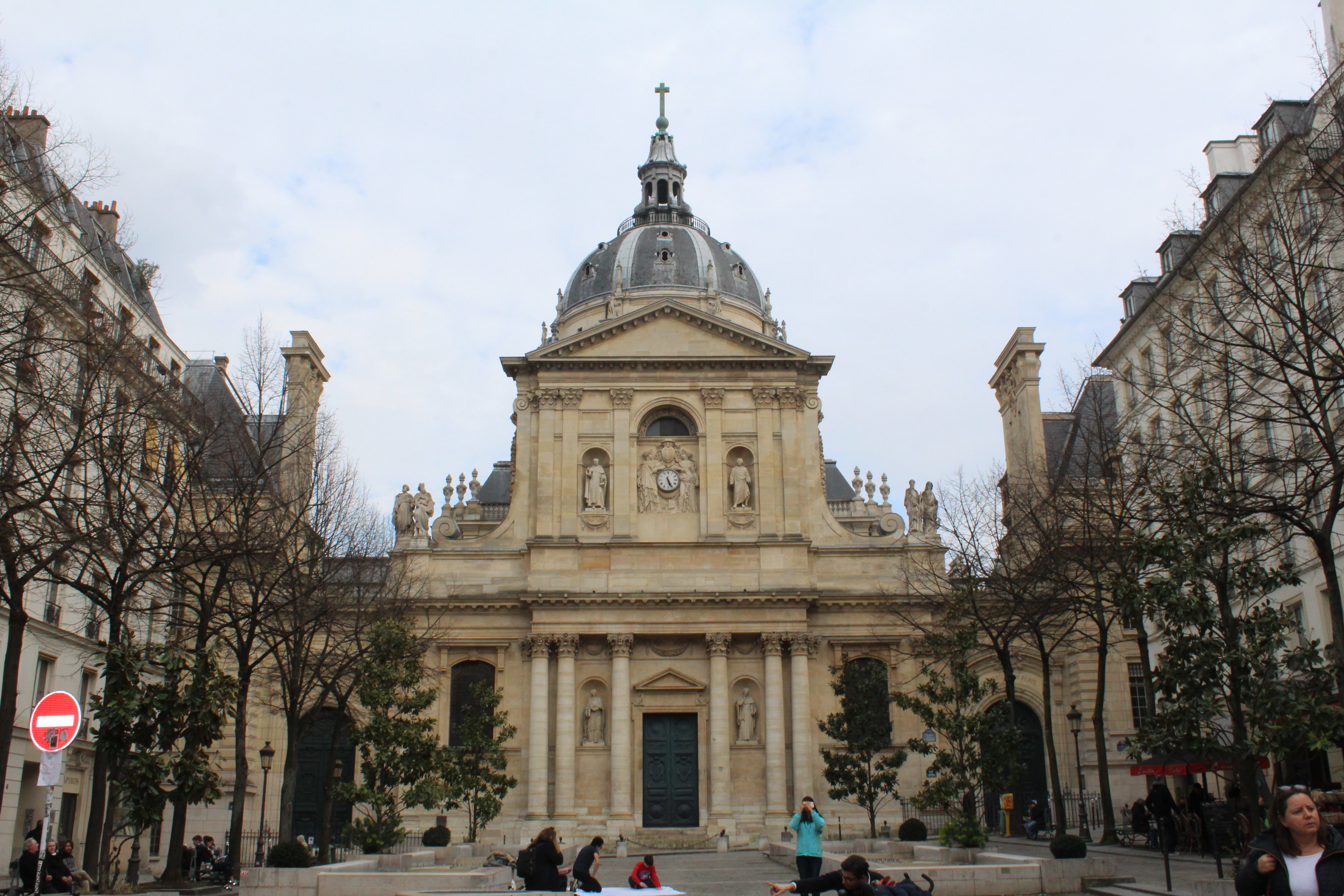
Chapel of the Sorbonne by Jacques Lemercier (1626–35)

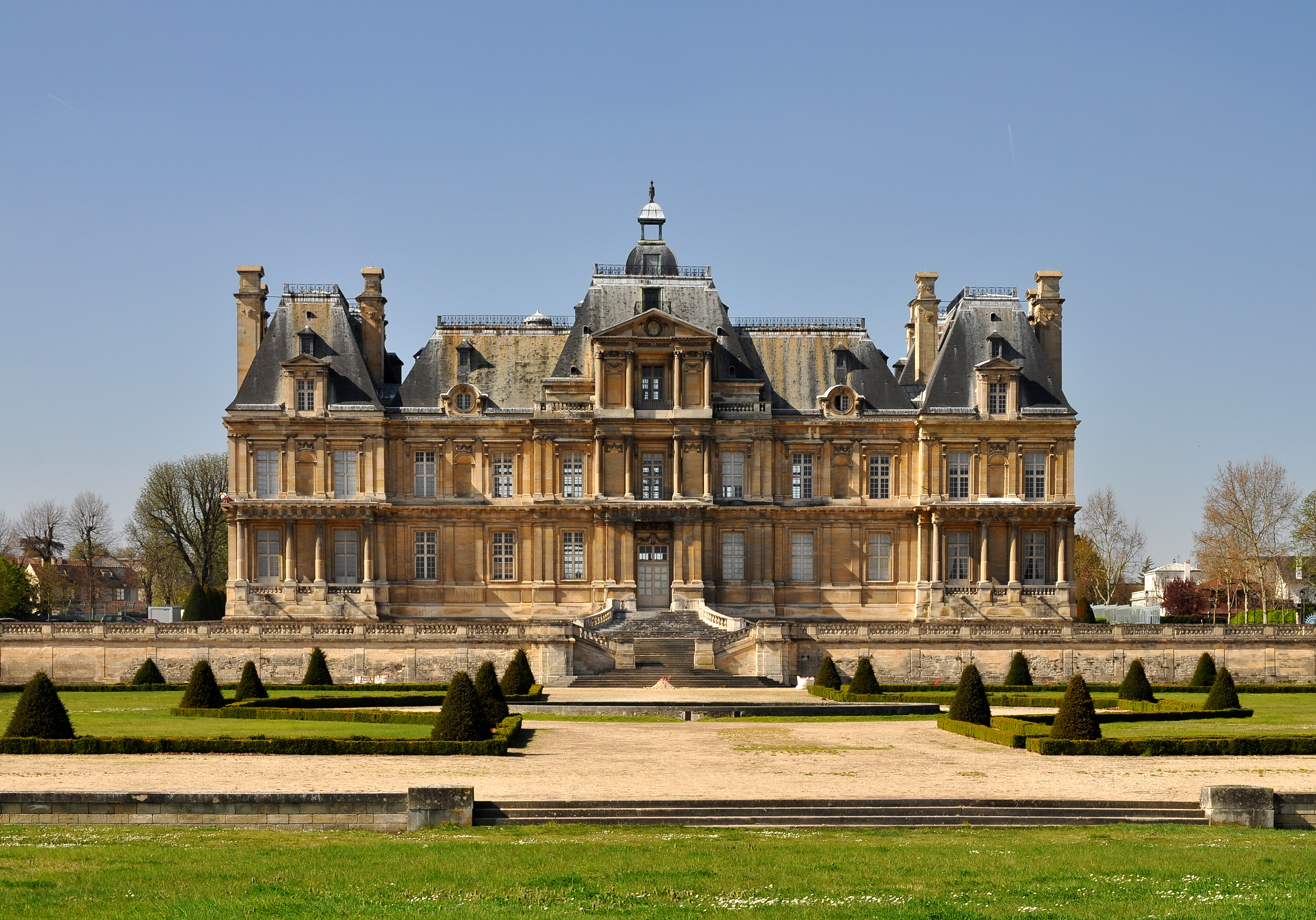
Château de Maisons by François Mansart (1630–1651)

King Louis XIII had sent the architect Jacques Lemercier to Rome between 1607 and 1614 to study the new style. On his return to France, he designed the Pavillon de l’Horloge of the Louvre Palace (beginning 1626), and, more importantly, the Sorbonne Chapel, the first church dome in Paris. It was designed in 1626, and construction began in 1635. The next important French Baroque project was a much larger dome for the church of Val-de-Grâce begun in 1645 by Lemercier and François Mansart, and finished in 1667. A third Baroque dome was soon added for the Collège des Quatre-Nations (now the Institut de France).

In 1661, following the death of Cardinal Mazarin, the young Louis XIV took direct charge of the government. The arts were put under the direction of his Controller-General of Finances, Jean-Baptiste Colbert. Charles Le Brun, director of the Royal Academy of Painting and Sculpture, was named Superintendent of Buildings of the King, in charge of all royal architectural projects. The Académie royale d'architecture was founded in 1671, with the mission of making Paris, not Rome, the artistic and architectural model for the world.

The first architectural project of Louis XIV was a proposed reconstruction of the façade of the east wing of the Louvre Palace. Bernini, then Europe's most famous architect, was summoned to Paris to submit a design. Beginning in 1664, Bernini proposed several Baroque variants, but in the end the King selected a design by a French architect, Claude Perrault, in a more classical variant of Baroque. This gradually became the Louis XIV style. Louis was soon engaged in an even larger project, the construction of the new Palace of Versailles. The architects chosen were Louis Le Vau and Jules Hardouin-Mansart, and the façades of the new palace were constructed around the earlier Marble Court between 1668 and 1678. The Baroque grandeur of Versailles, particularly the façade facing the garden and the Hall of Mirrors by Jules Hardouin-Mansart, became models for other palaces across Europe.

==== Netherlands ====
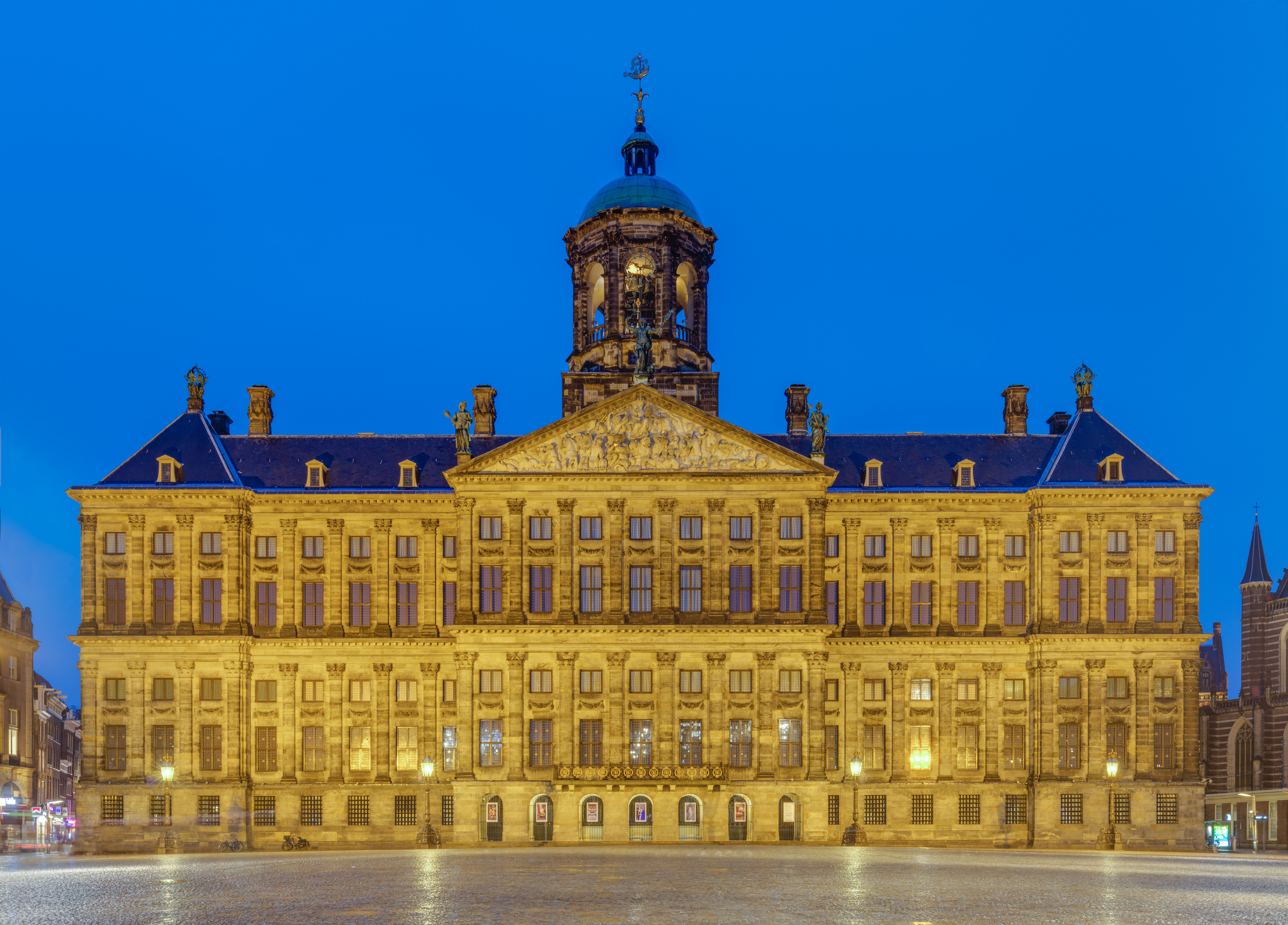
Royal Palace of Amsterdam: Jacob van Campen, 1646.

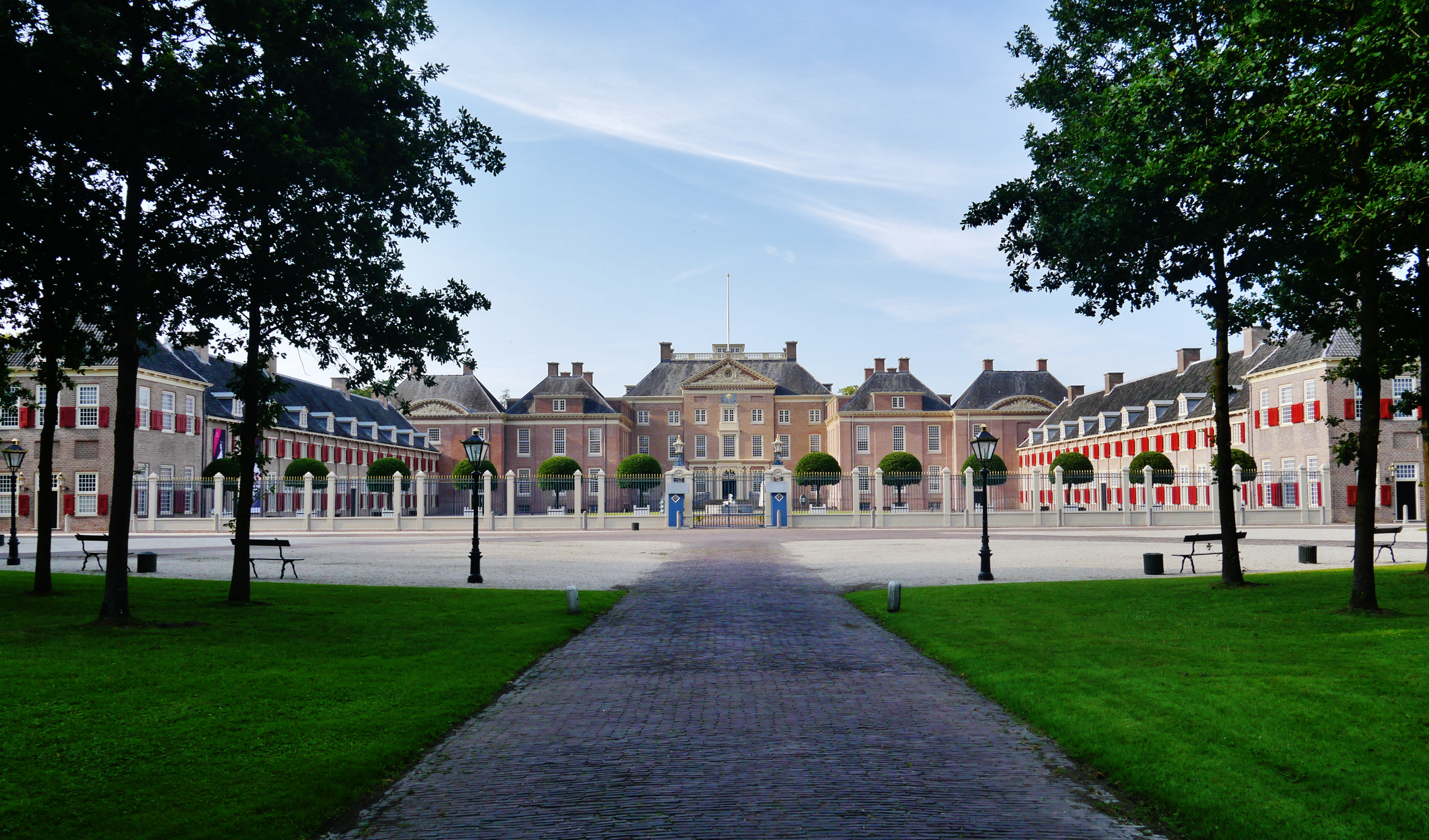
Het Loo Palace: Daniel Marot, 1686.

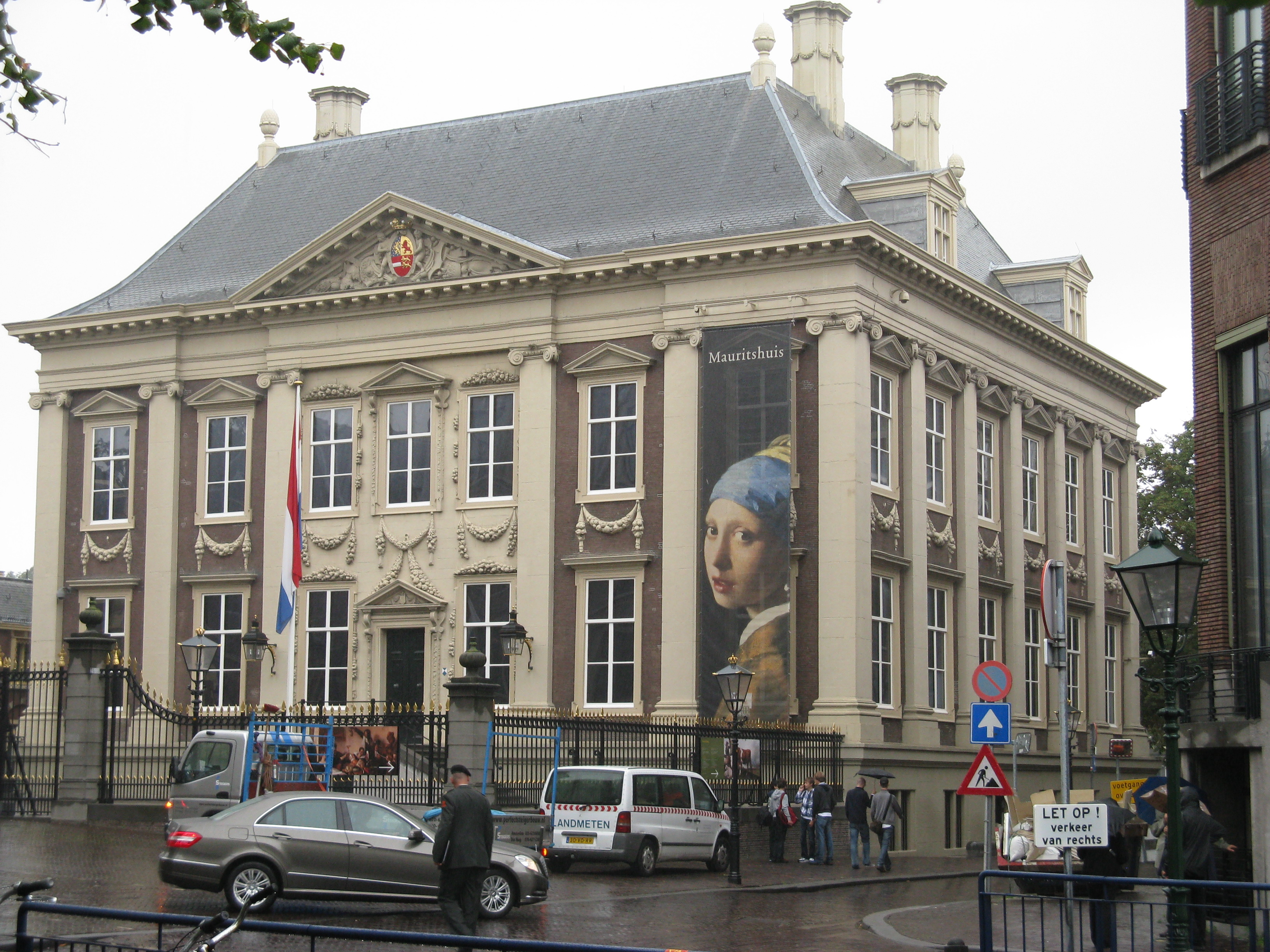
Mauritshuis: Pieter Post, 1641.

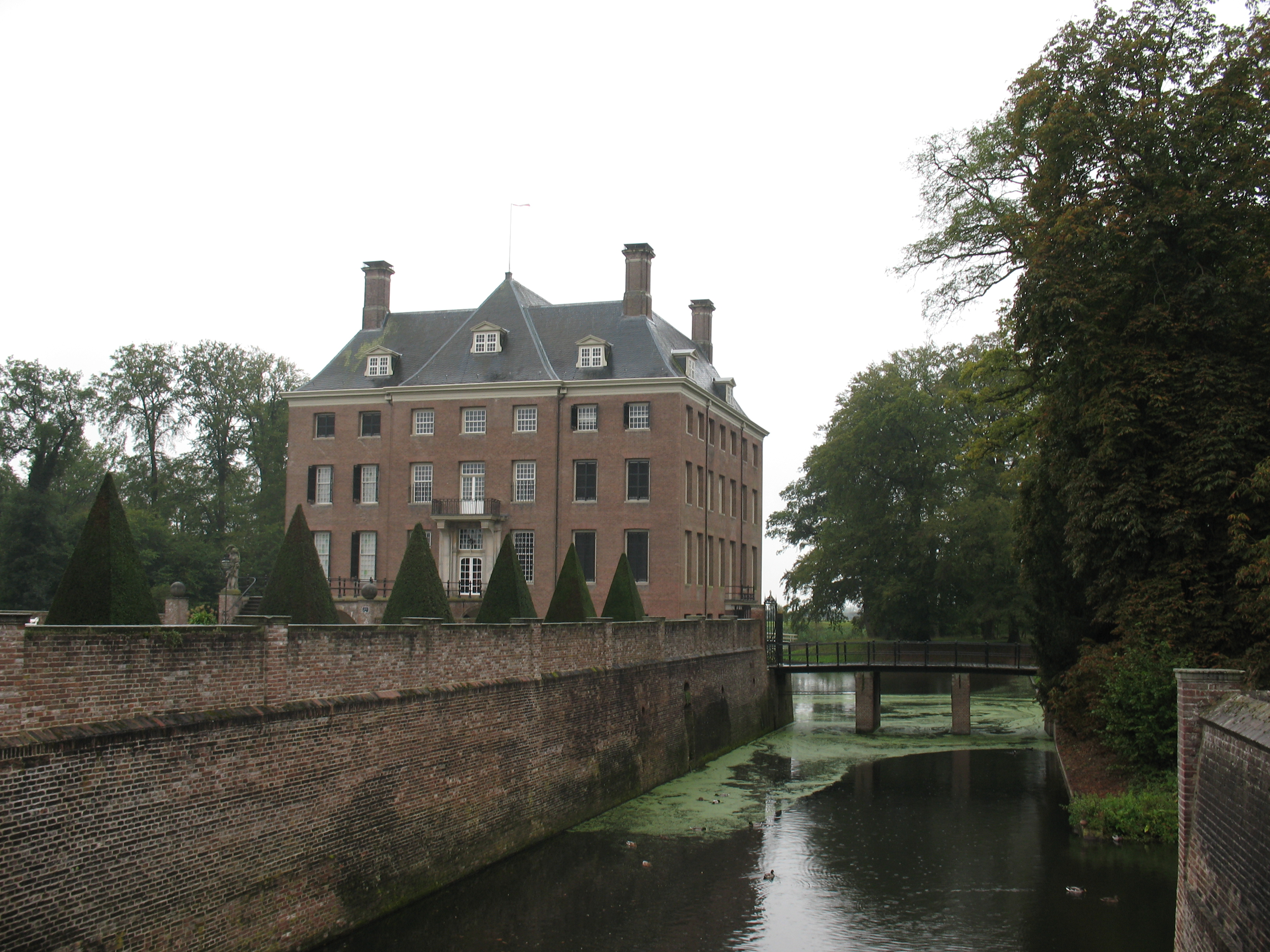
Amerongen Castle: Maurits Post, 1678.

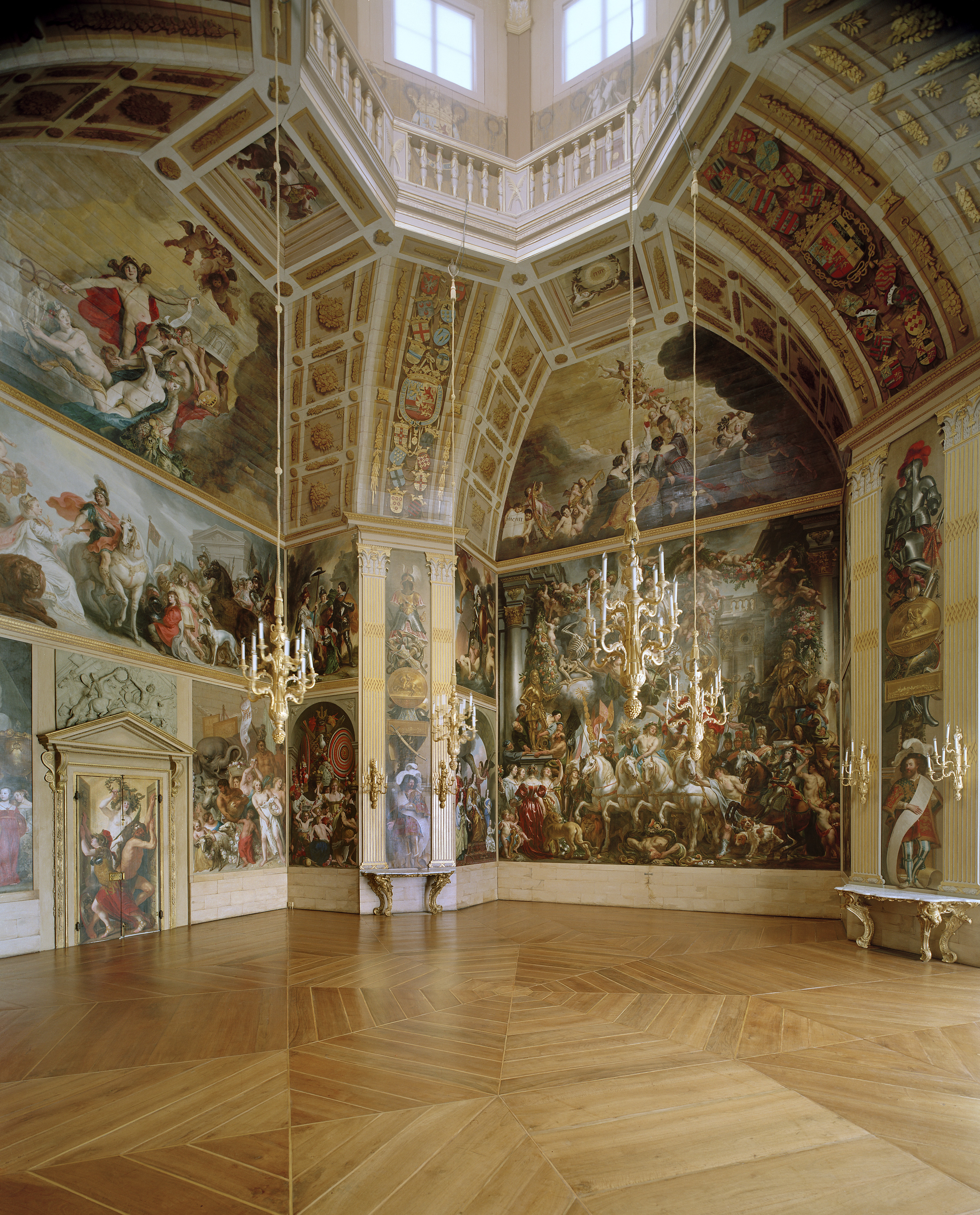
The baroque Oranjezaal in palace Huis ten Bosch in The Hague,, 1651.

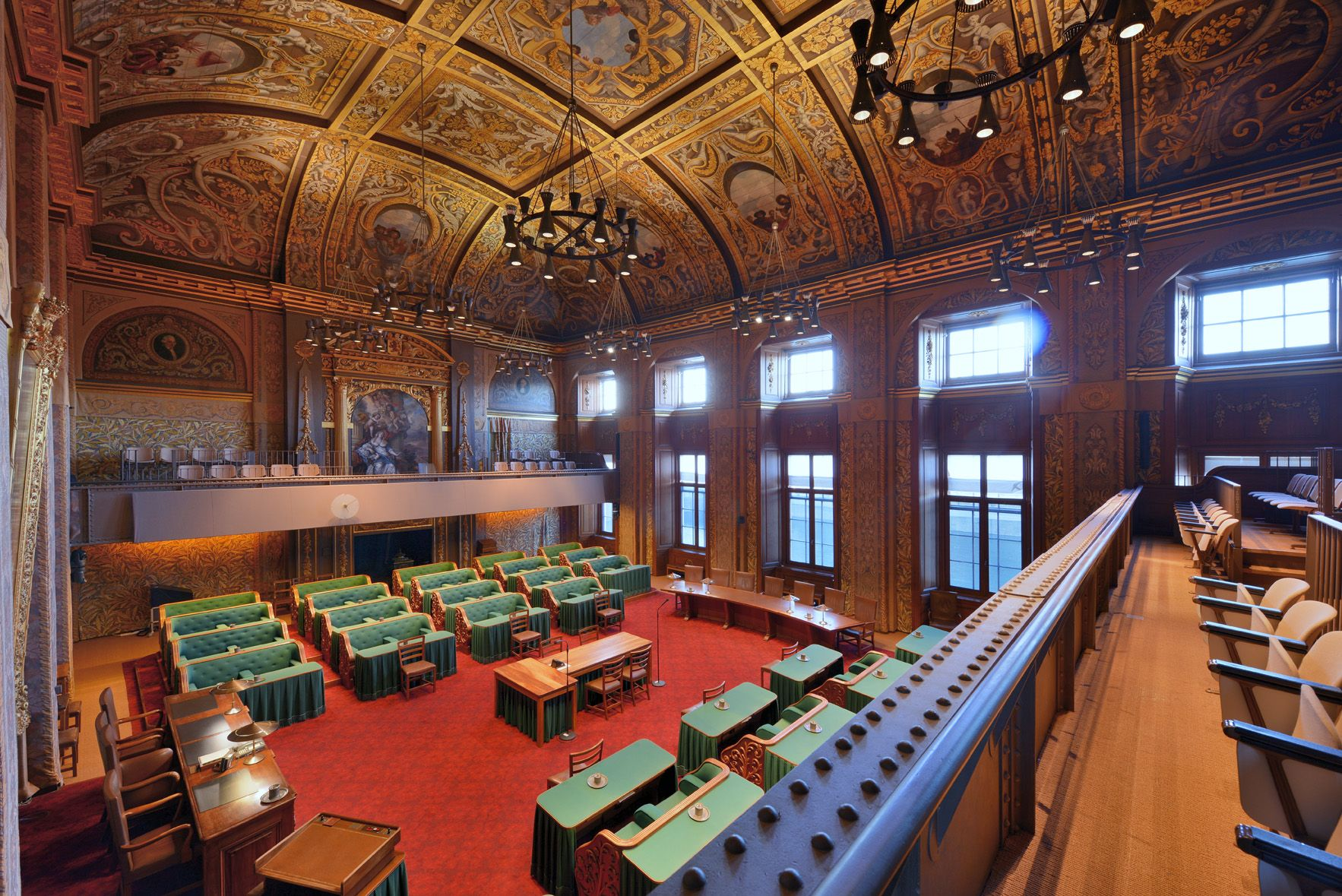
The baroque Plenary Hall of the Dutch Senate in the parliament building the Binnenhof, The Hague, 1666.

Dutch Baroque architecture represents a distinctive and restrained interpretation of the Baroque style, shaped by the cultural, religious, and political climate of the Dutch Republic in the seventeenth century. Unlike the exuberant and theatrical Baroque architecture found in Catholic regions such as Italy and Spain, the Dutch variant favored sobriety, balance, and clarity. This moderation reflected the Protestant values of the Republic, as well as the pragmatic mindset of a prosperous mercantile society that valued function as much as form.

Rather than dramatic curves and lavish ornamentation, Dutch Baroque architecture is characterized by symmetry, classical proportions, and a controlled use of decorative elements. Influenced by Renaissance, classicism and the work of architects such as Jacob van Campen and Pieter Post, buildings often feature orderly façades, pilasters, pediments, and carefully measured ornament. Brick was the dominant material, frequently combined with natural stone accents, reinforcing both durability and visual restraint. Civic buildings, town halls, and private residences exemplify this style, with the Royal Palace of Amsterdam standing as one of its most prominent monuments.

Dutch Baroque architecture represents a distinct national adaptation of the broader Baroque movement, emphasizing restraint and harmony rather than theatrical excess. This synthesis demonstrates how international artistic conventions were modified to align with local values and traditions, producing a style that reflects both Baroque characteristics and Dutch architectural heritage.

=== Late Baroque (1675–1750) ===
During the period of the Late Baroque (1675–1750), the style appeared across Europe, from England and France to Central Europe and Russia, from Spain and Portugal to Scandinavia, and in the colonies of Spain and Portugal in the New World and the Philippines. It often took different names, and the regional variations became more distinct. A particularly ornate variant appeared in the early 18th century, called Rocaille in France and Rococo in Spain and Central Europe. The sculpted and painted decoration covering every space on the walls and ceiling. The most prominent architects of this style included Balthasar Neumann, noted for the Basilica of the Fourteen Holy Helpers and the Wurzburg Residence (1749–51). These works were among the final expressions of the Rococo or the Late Baroque.

==== Italy ====
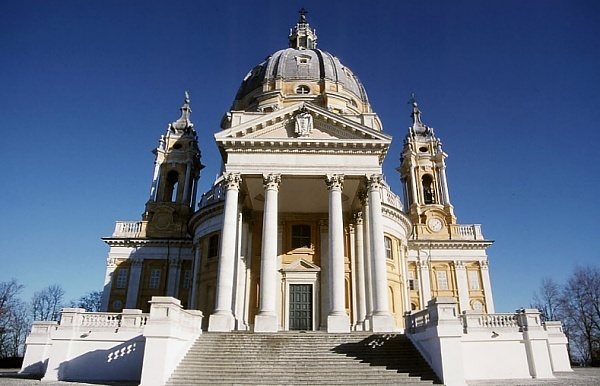
The Basilica of Superga near Turin by Filippo Juvarra (1717–1731)

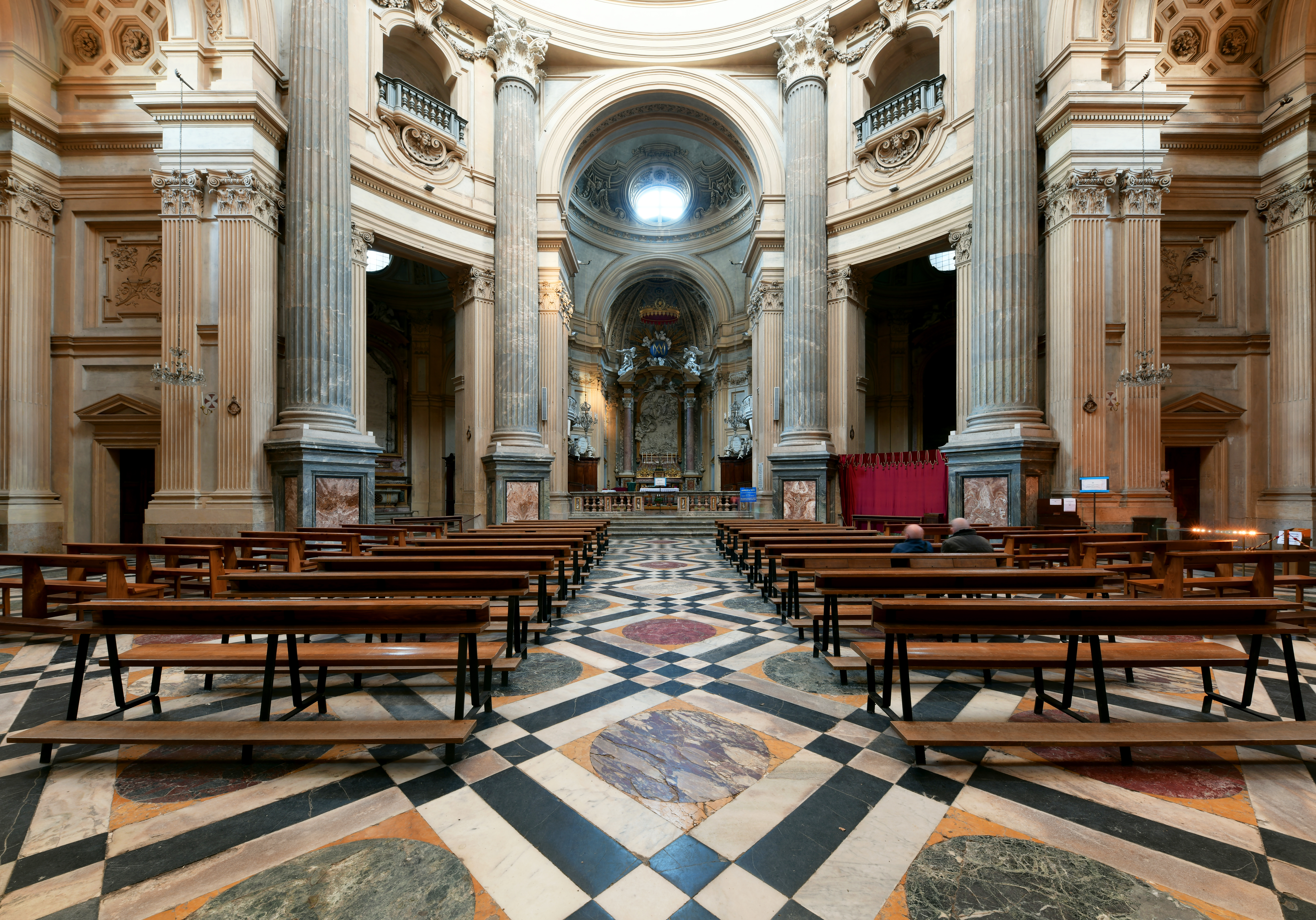
Interior of the Basilica of Superga by Filippo Juvarra

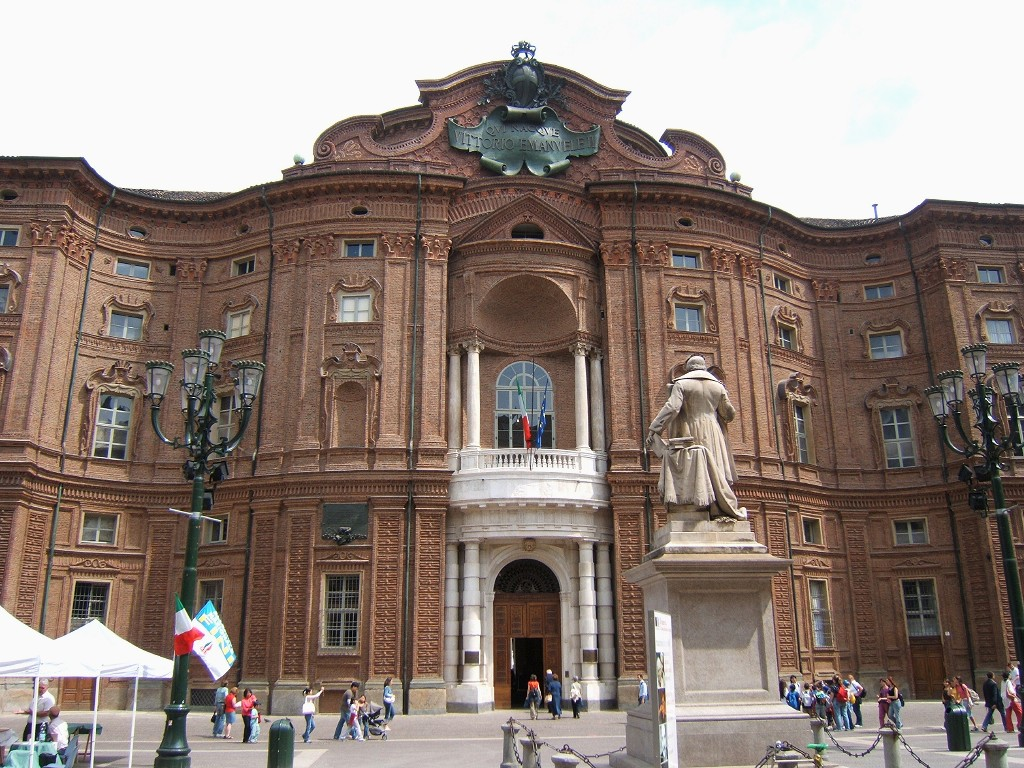
The Palazzo Carignano, now the Museum of the Italian Renaissance, Turin

By the early 18th century, Baroque buildings could be found in all parts of Italy, often with regional variations. Notable examples included the Basilica of Superga, overlooking Turin, by Filippo Juvarra (1717–1731), which was later used as model for the Panthéon in Paris. The Stupinigi Palace (1729–31) was a hunting lodge and one of the Residences of the Royal House of Savoy near Turin. It was also built by Filippo Juvarra.

==== France ====
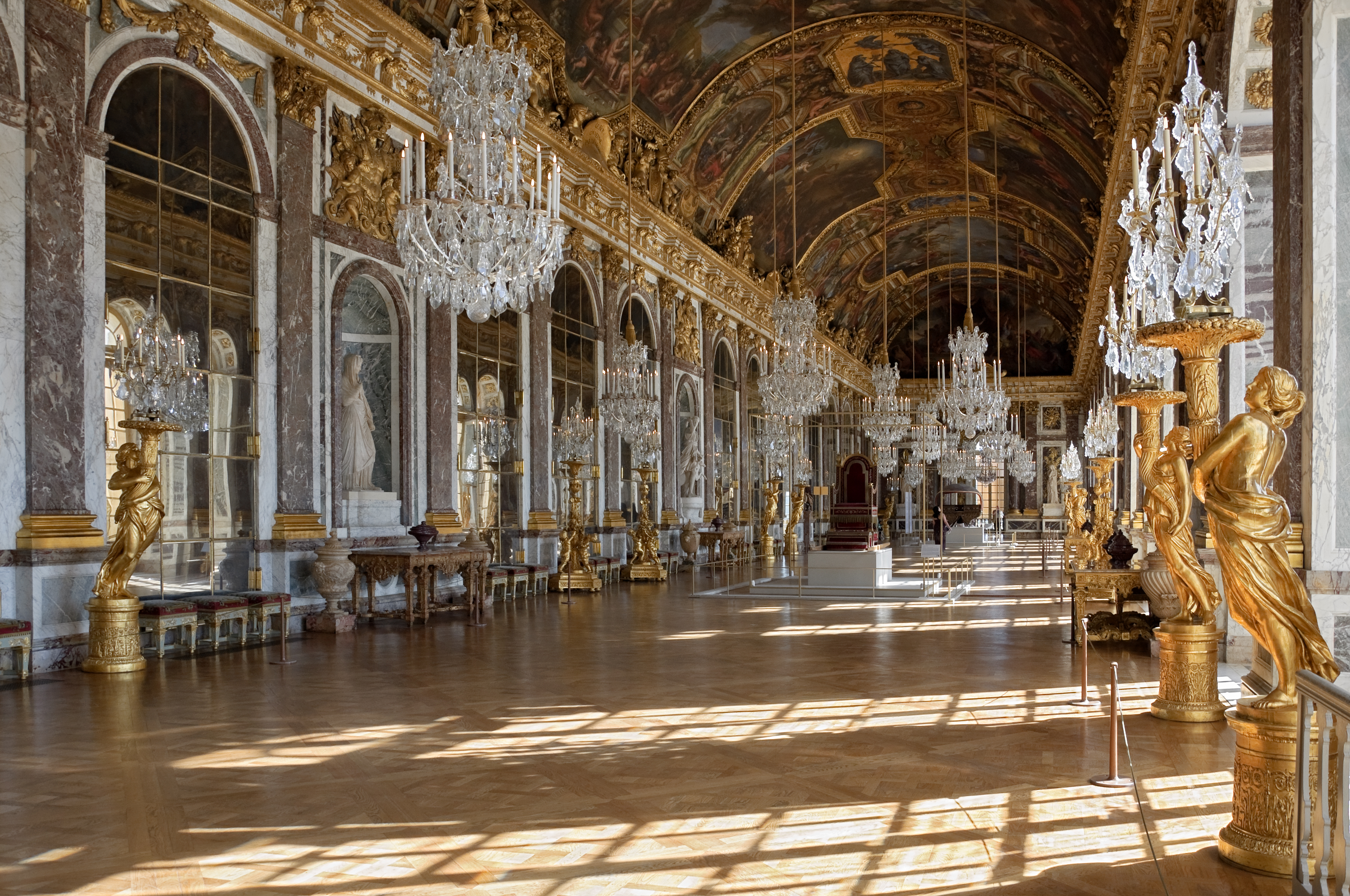
Hall of Mirrors in the Palace of Versailles by Jules Hardouin-Mansart (begun 1678–1686)

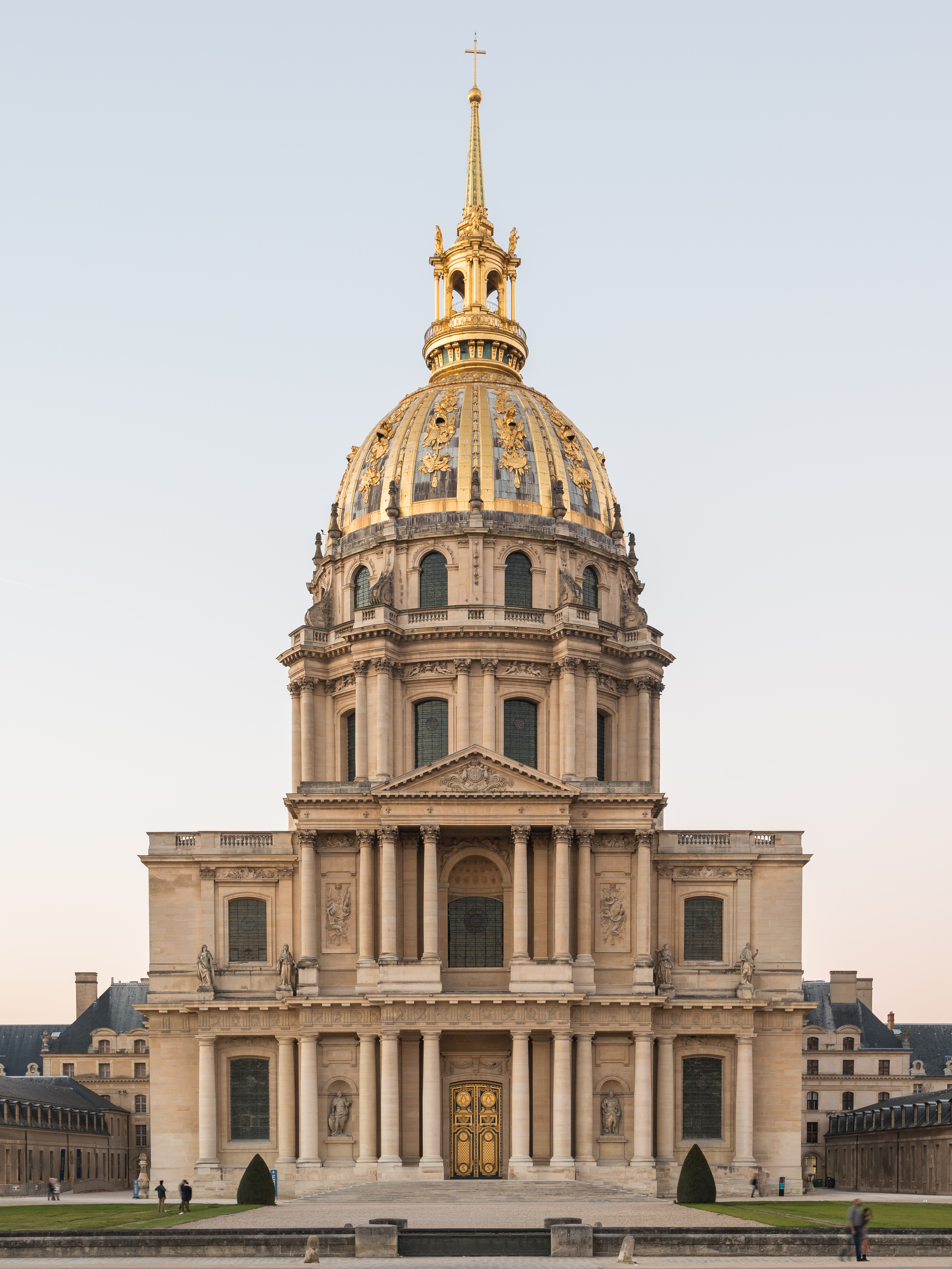
Chapel of Les Invalides, Jules Hardouin-Mansart (completed 1708)

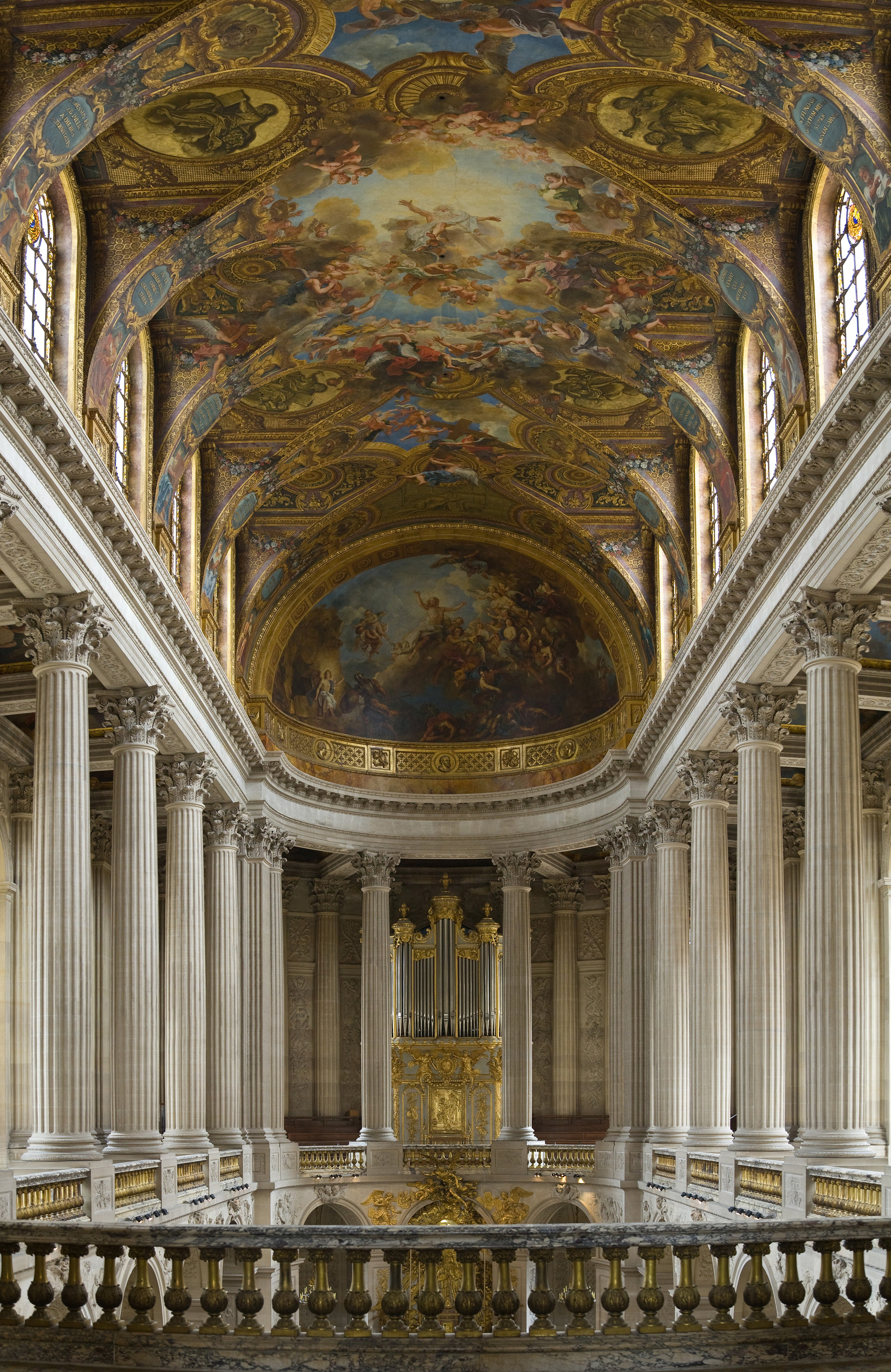
Chapel of the Palace of Versailles begun by Jules Hardouin-Mansart (1699 to 1710)

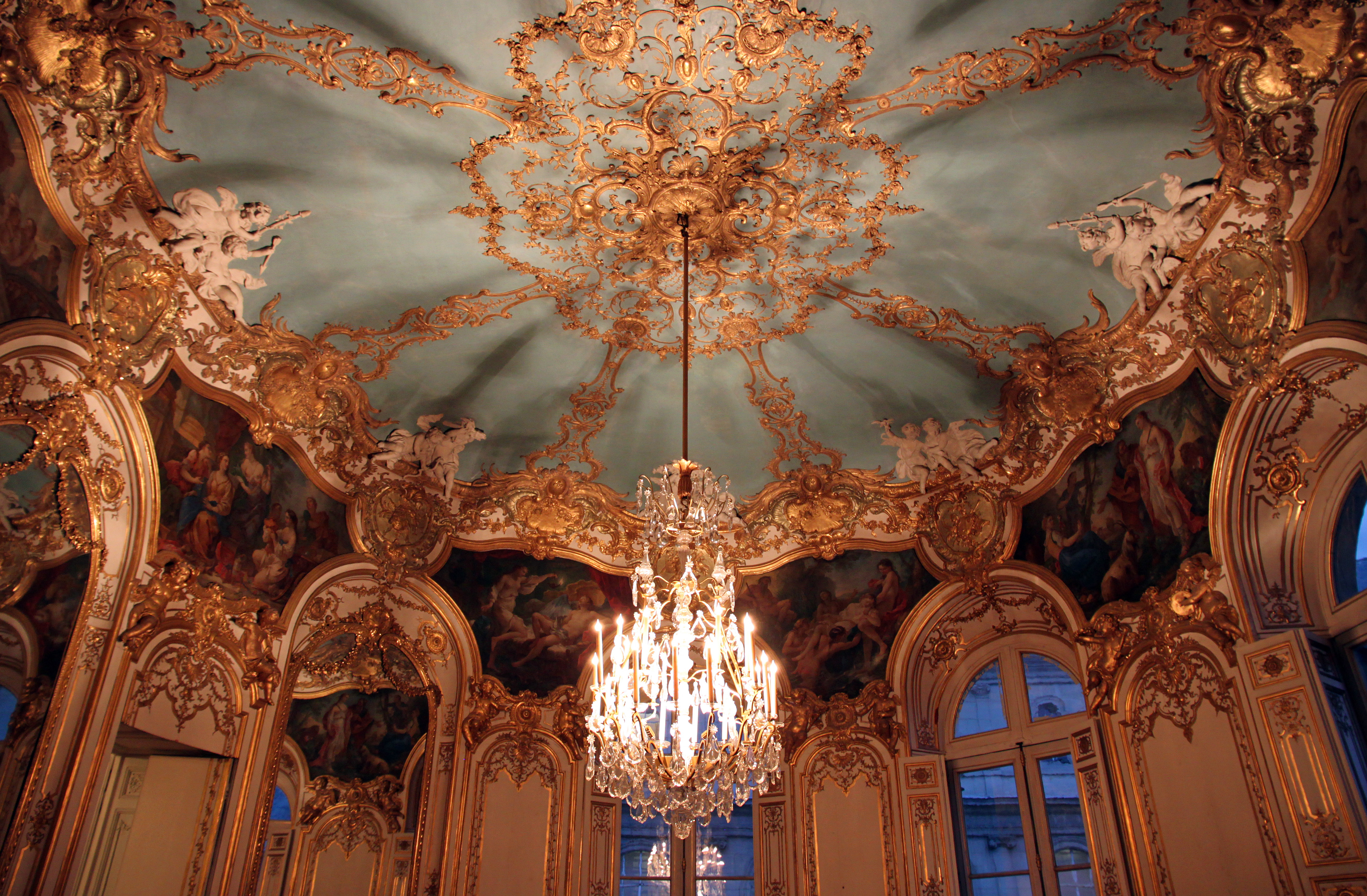
Salon of the Hôtel de Soubise in Paris (1735–40) by Germain Boffrand

The Late Baroque period in France saw the evolving decoration of the Palace of Versailles, including the Hall of Mirrors and the Chapel. Later in the period, during the reign of Louis XV, a new, more ornate variant, the Rocaille style, or French Rococo, appeared in Paris and flourished between about 1723 and 1759. The most prominent example was the salon of the Princess in Hôtel de Soubise in Paris, designed by Germain Boffrand and Charles-Joseph Natoire (1735–40).

==== England ====
Christopher Wren was the leading figure of the late Baroque in England, with his reconstruction of St. Paul's Cathedral (1675–1711) inspired by the model of St. Peter's Basilica in Rome, his plan for Greenwich Hospital (begun 1695), and Hampton Court Palace (1690–96). Other British figures of the late Baroque included Inigo Jones for Wilton House (1632–1647 and two pupils of Wren, John Vanbrugh and Nicholas Hawksmoor, for Castle Howard (1699–1712) and Blenheim Palace (1705–1724).

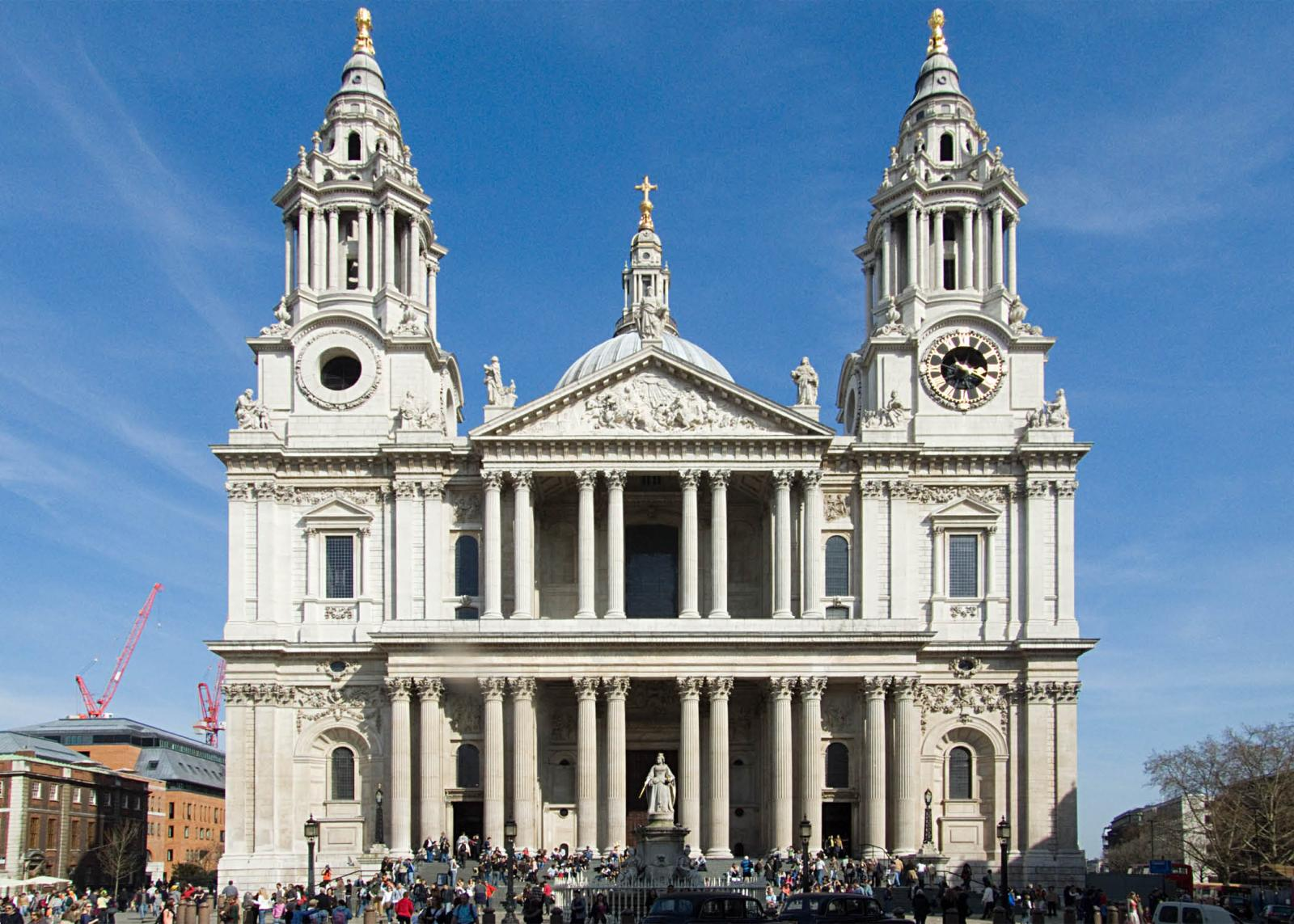
West façade of Saint Paul's Cathedral by Christopher Wren (1675–1702)

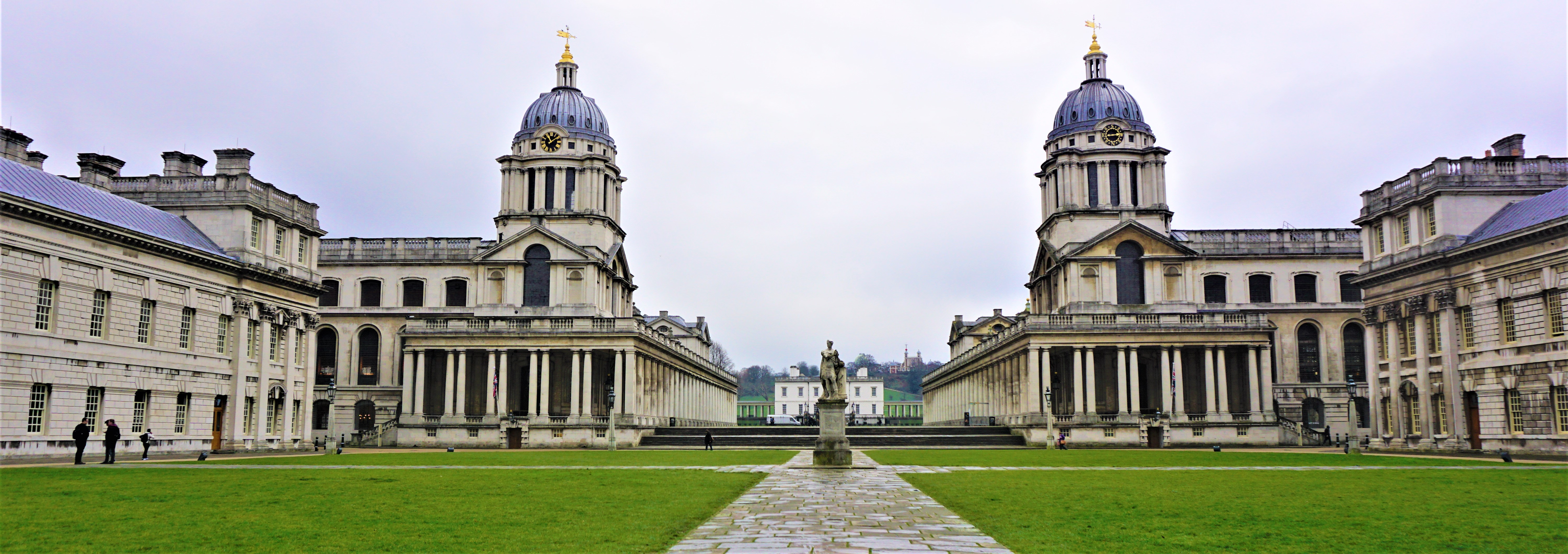
Greenwich Hospital by Christopher Wren (1694)

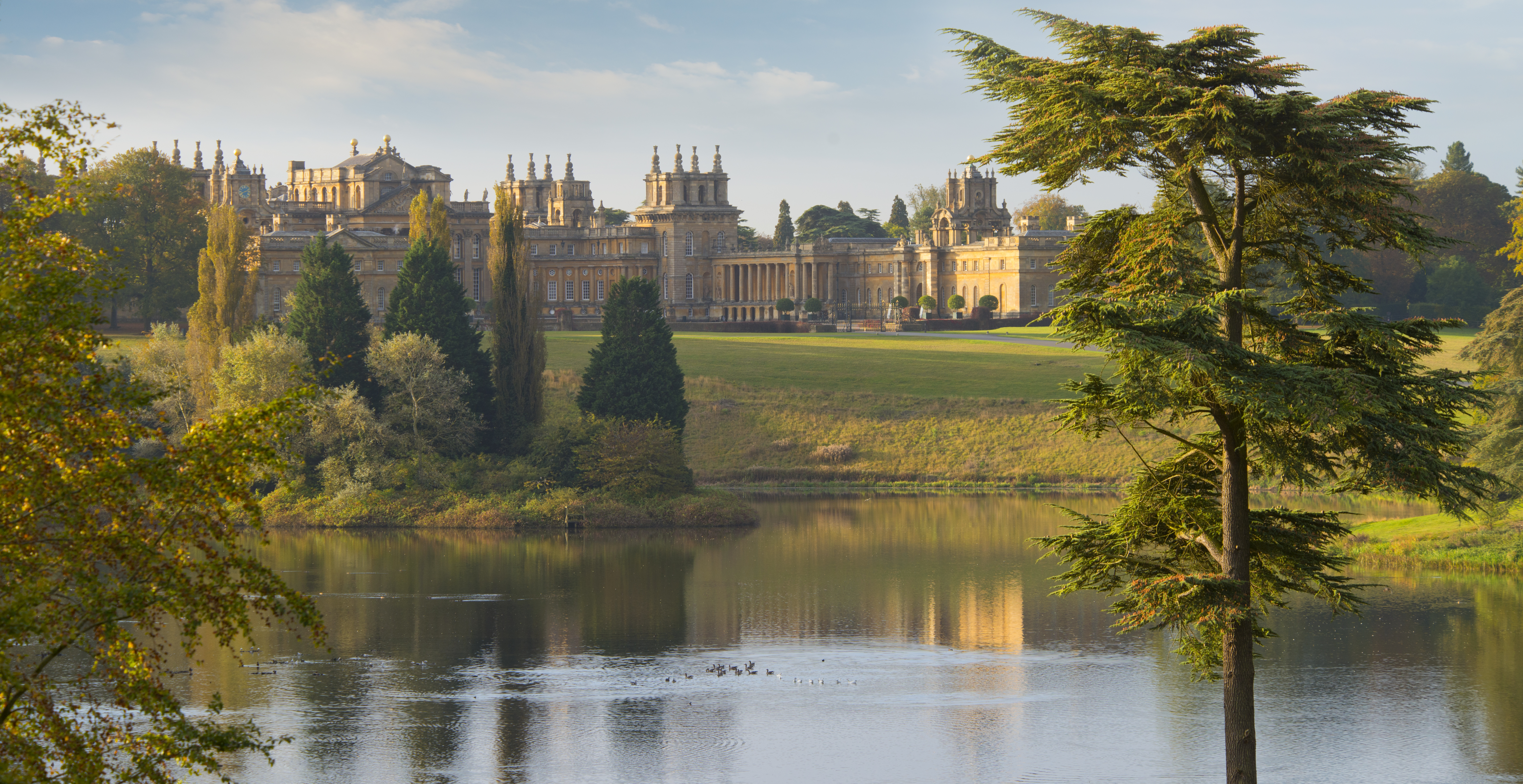
Blenheim Palace by John Vanbrugh and Nicholas Hawksmoor

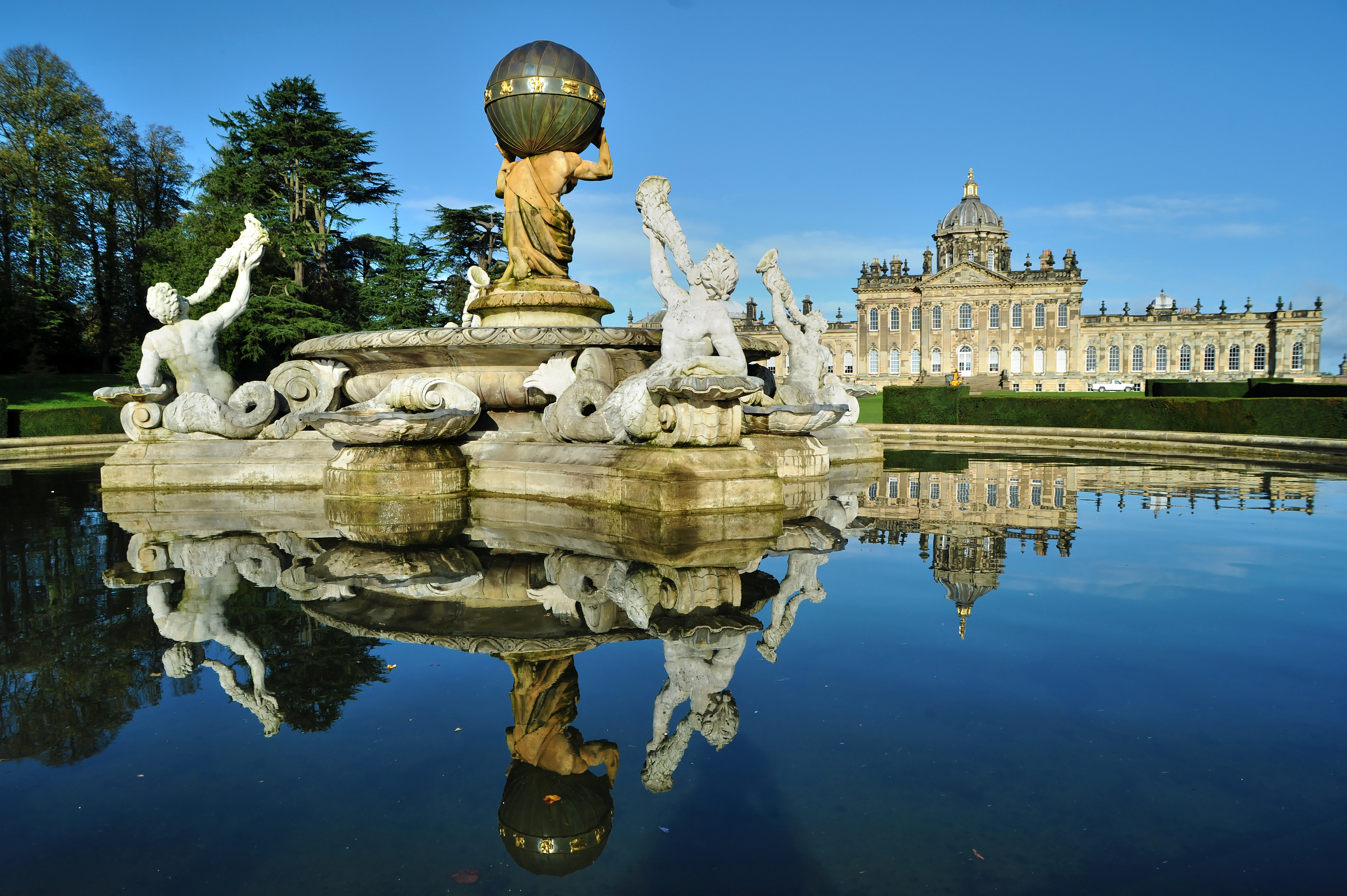
Castle Howard, North Yorkshire by John Vanbrugh and Nicholas Hawksmoor (1699–1712)

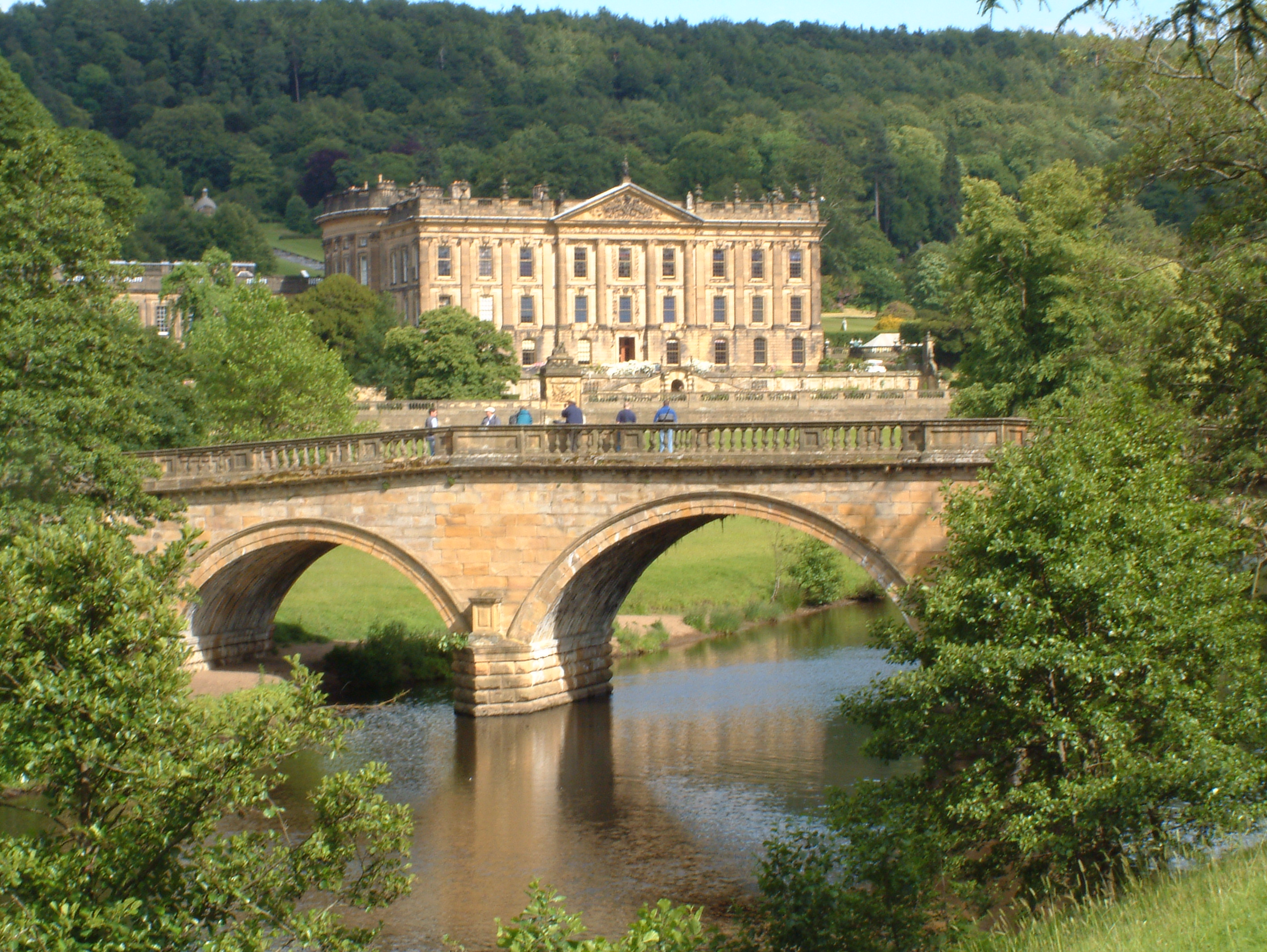
Chatsworth House by William Cavendish

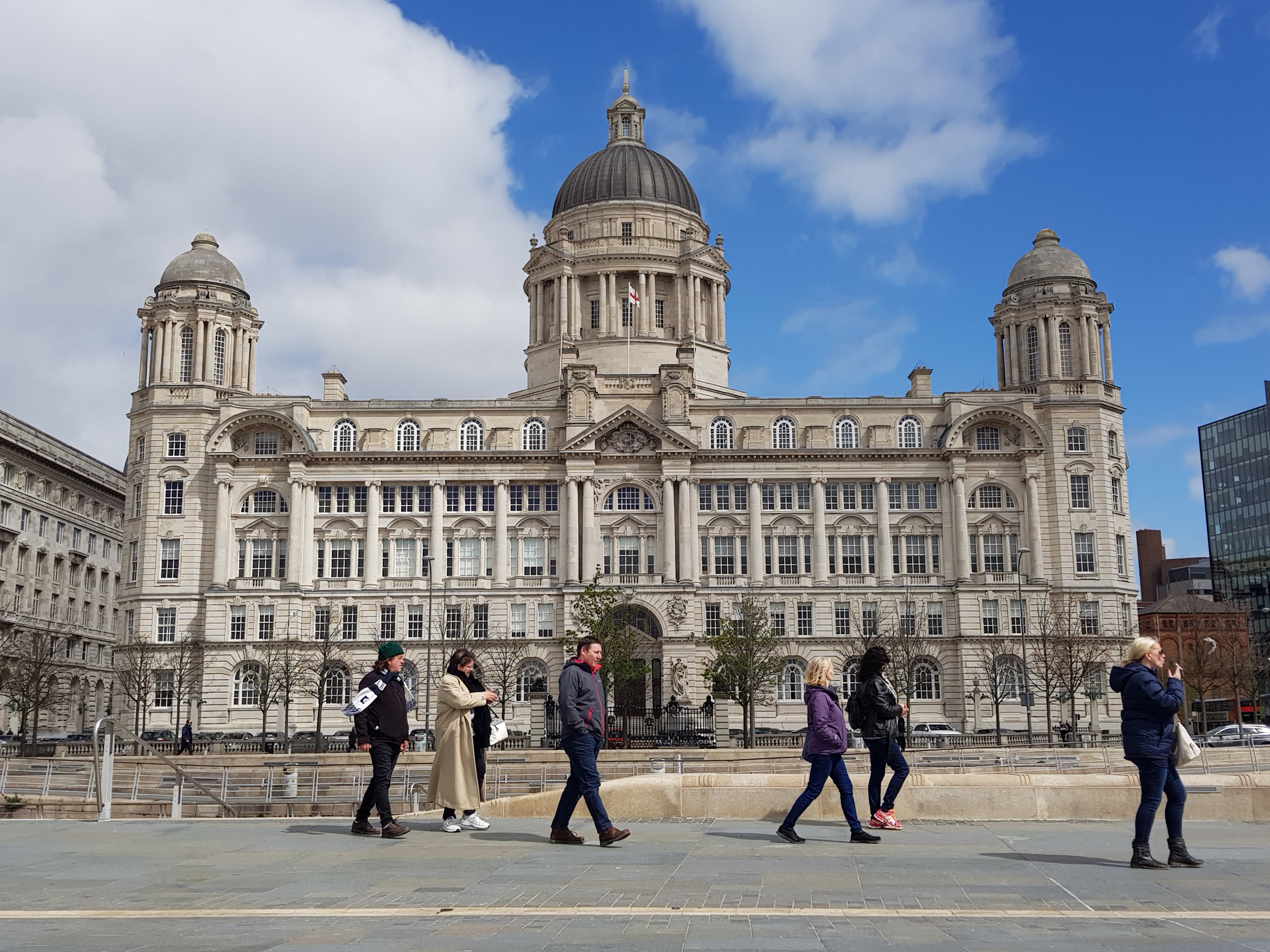
Port of Liverpool Building by Sir Arnold Thornely, an example of Edwardian Baroque in the early 20th century.

==== Lithuania ====
In the Grand Duchy of Lithuania (which covered the territories of modern-day Lithuania and Belarus), Baroque architecture emerged in the late 16th century and evolved through three main phases: early, mature, and late. The style was initially introduced by the Jesuits as part of the Counter-Reformation. The first Baroque monuments were the Corpus Christi Church in Nyasvizh (1587–1593) in modern Belarus and the Church of St. Casimir in Vilnius (1604–1616) in modern Lithuania.

The Early Baroque (late 16th – early 17th c.) saw the transformation of defensive castles into palace-castle complexes, such as Nyasvizh Castle (started 1583), Biržai Castle (1586), and Halshany Castle (c. 1610). In religious architecture, the basilican type of church spread, initially towerless and later with two towers on the main facade (e.g., Church of St. Francis Xavier, Kaunas, Church of St. Peter and St. Paul in Vilnius).

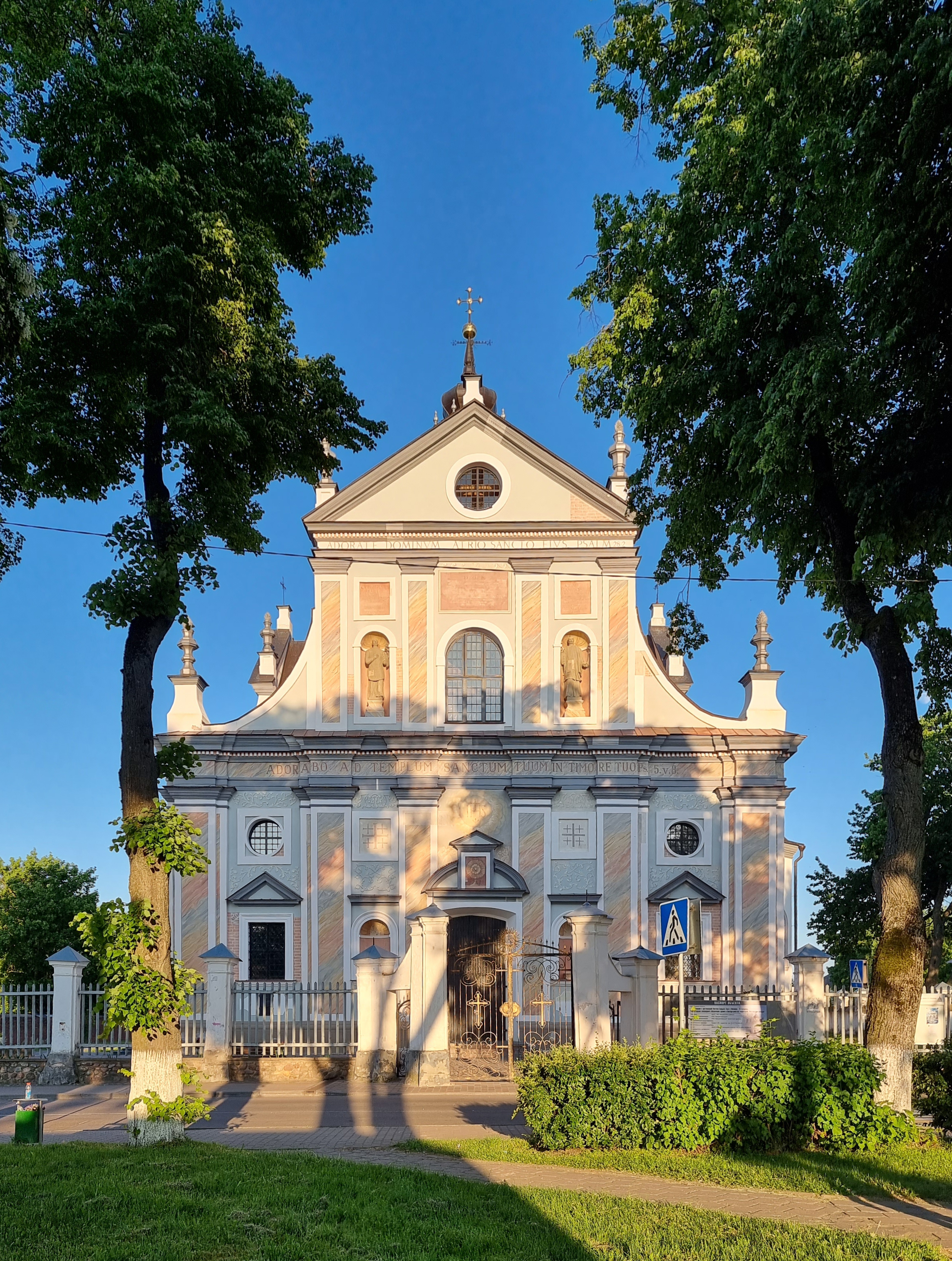
Corpus Christi Church in Nyasvizh (1587–1593), designed by Giovanni Maria Bernardoni, the first Baroque architectural monument in the Grand Duchy of Lithuania

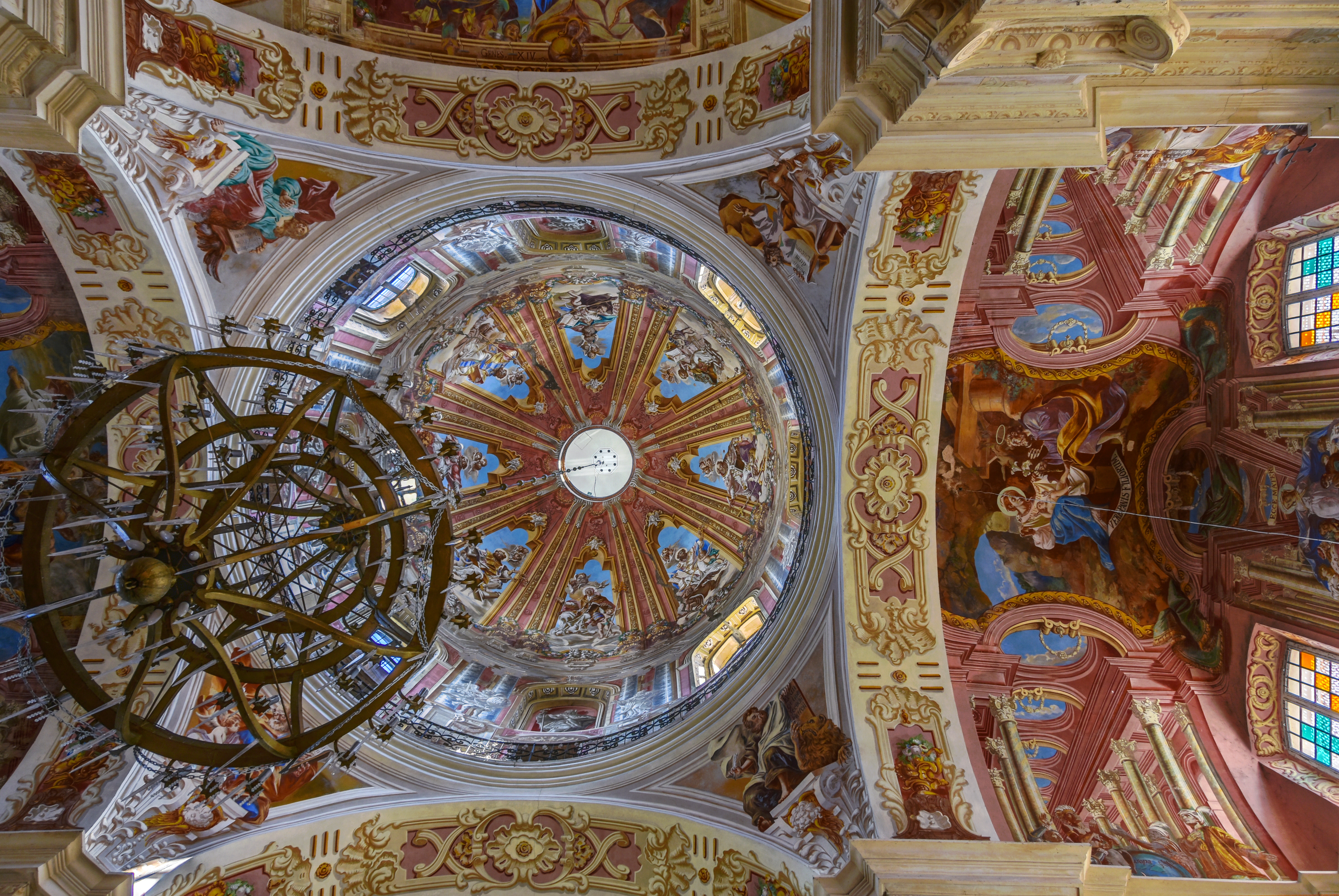
Interior of the Church of the Corpus Christi in Nyasvizh

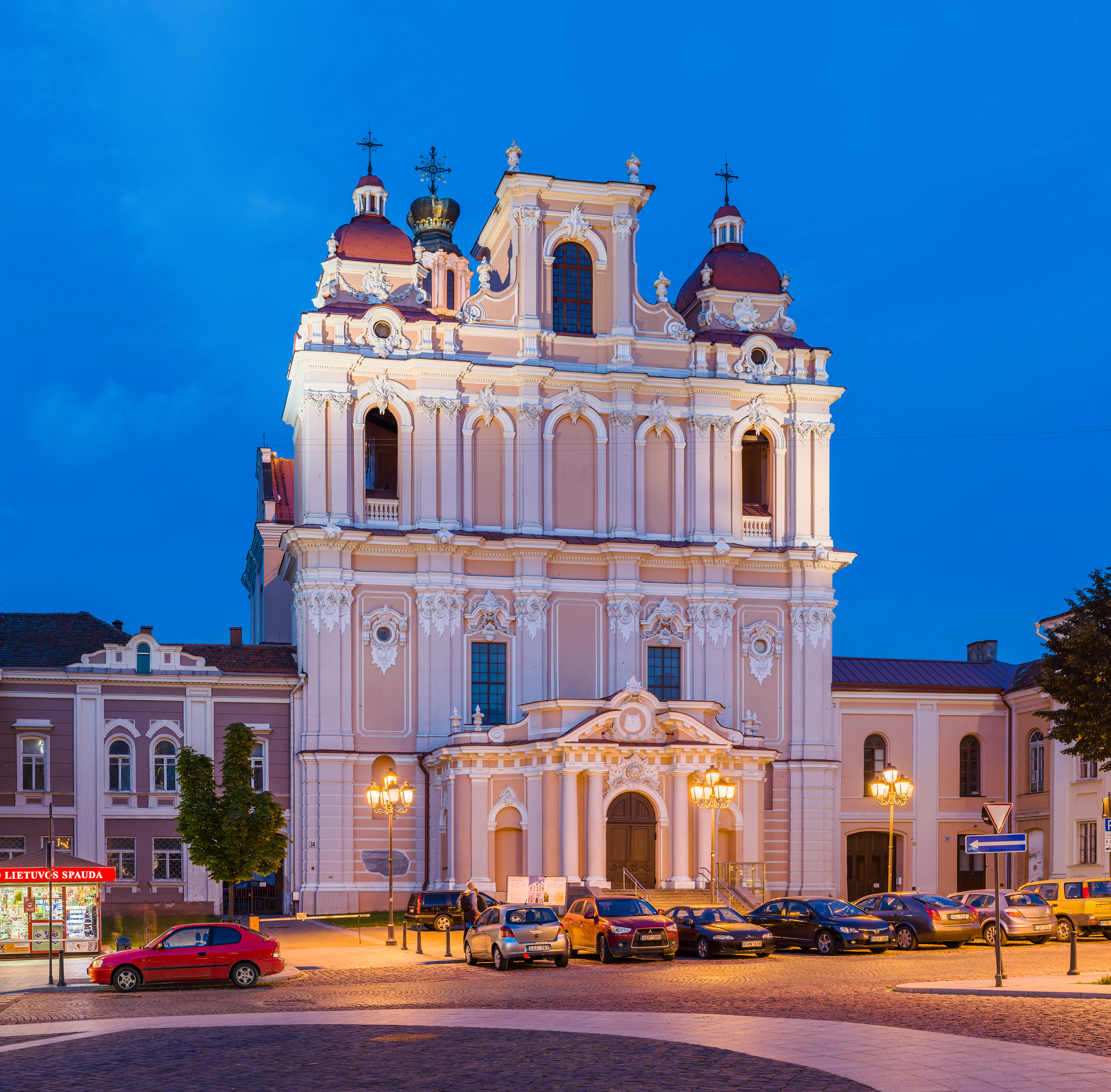
Church of St. Casimir, Vilnius, the first Baroque church in Vilnius (1604–1616). Reconstructed in the 18th century by Thomas Zebrowski

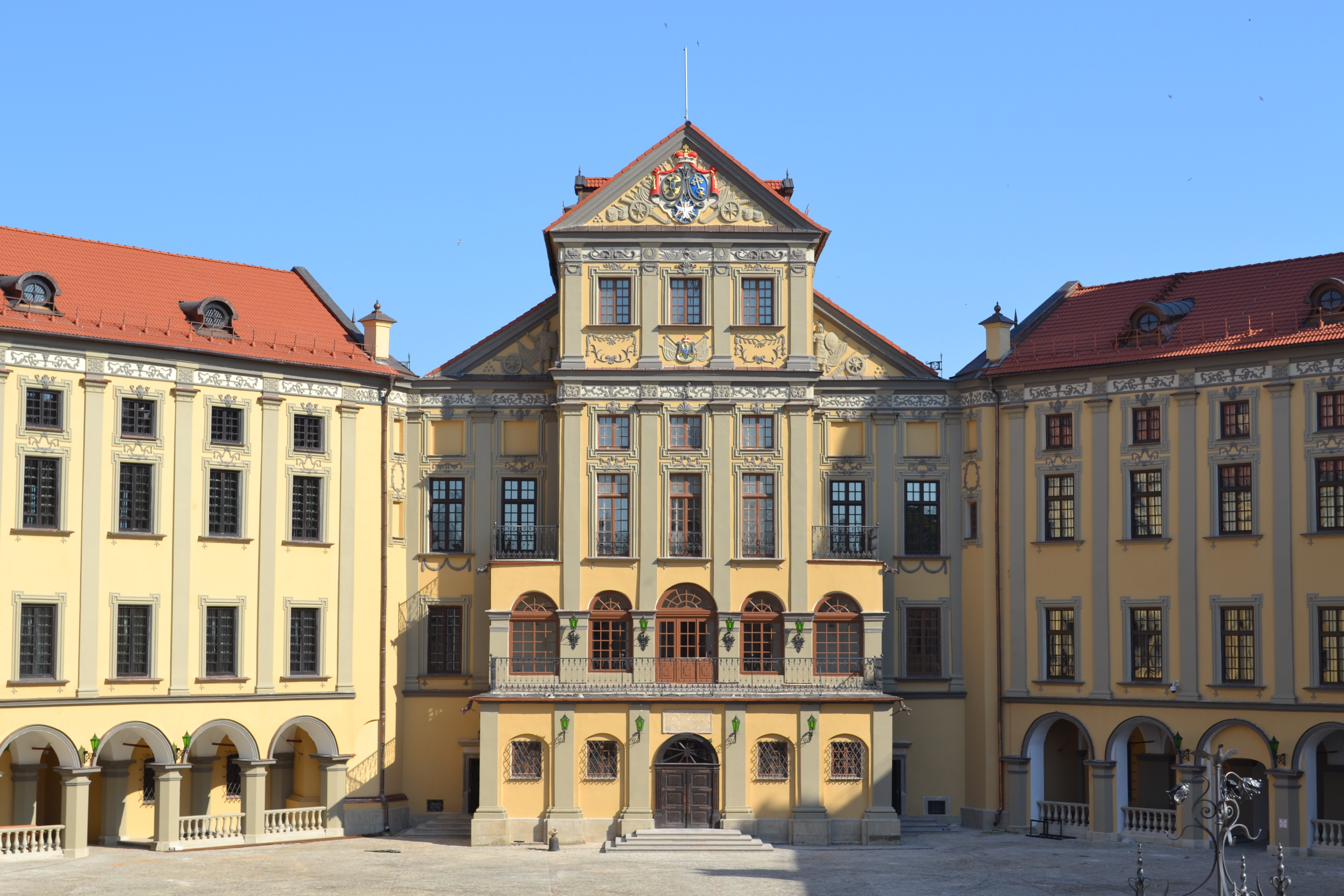
The main entrance to the Nyasvizh Castle, constructed with the participation of Italian architect Giovanni Maria Bernardoni

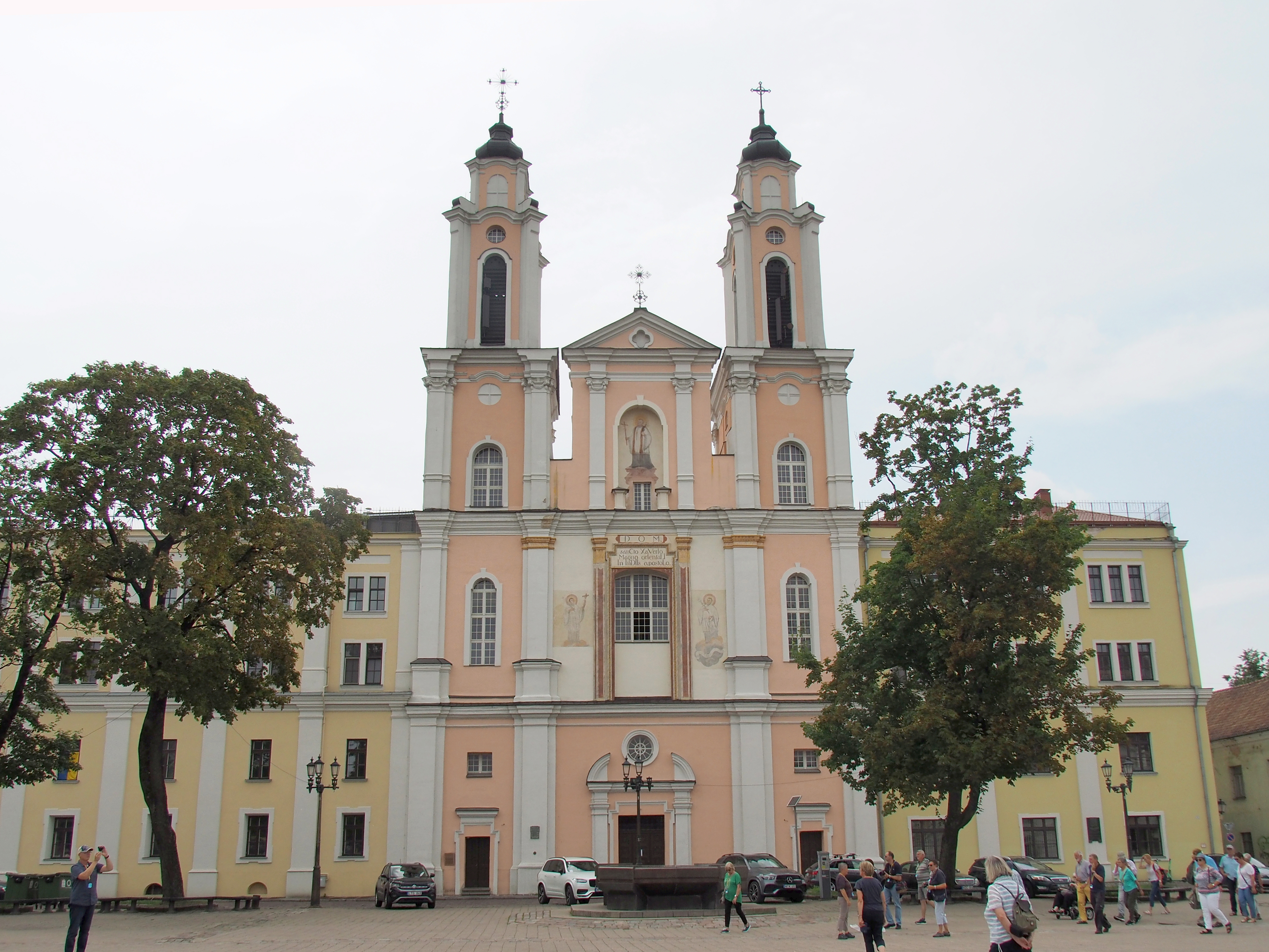
Church of St. Francis Xavier, Kaunas

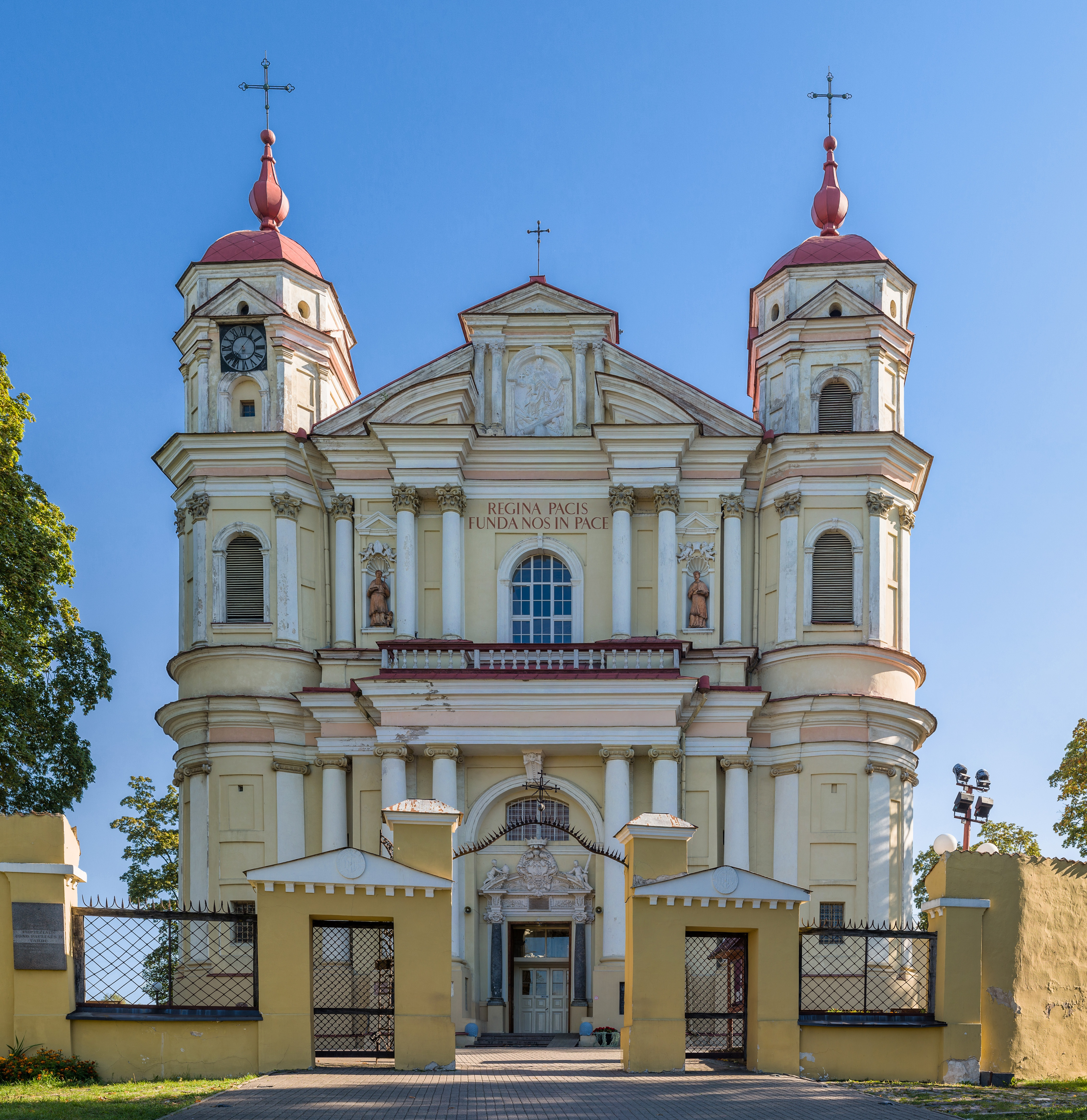
Church of St. Peter and St. Paul, Vilnius

During the Mature Baroque (second half of 17th – 1730s), the composition of the two-tower basilica stabilized, and facades became more plastically saturated. This period is characterized by the development of large monastic ensembles, such as the Pažaislis Monastery in Kaunas, the Tytuvėnai Monastery, and the Polotsk Jesuit Collegium. The nobility funded the construction of lavish personal residences, including the Sapieha Palace, Slushko Palace, and Minor Radvilos Palace in Vilnius, as well as the Ruzhany Palace in modern Belarus.

Church of the Visitation in the Pažaislis Monastery, Kaunas

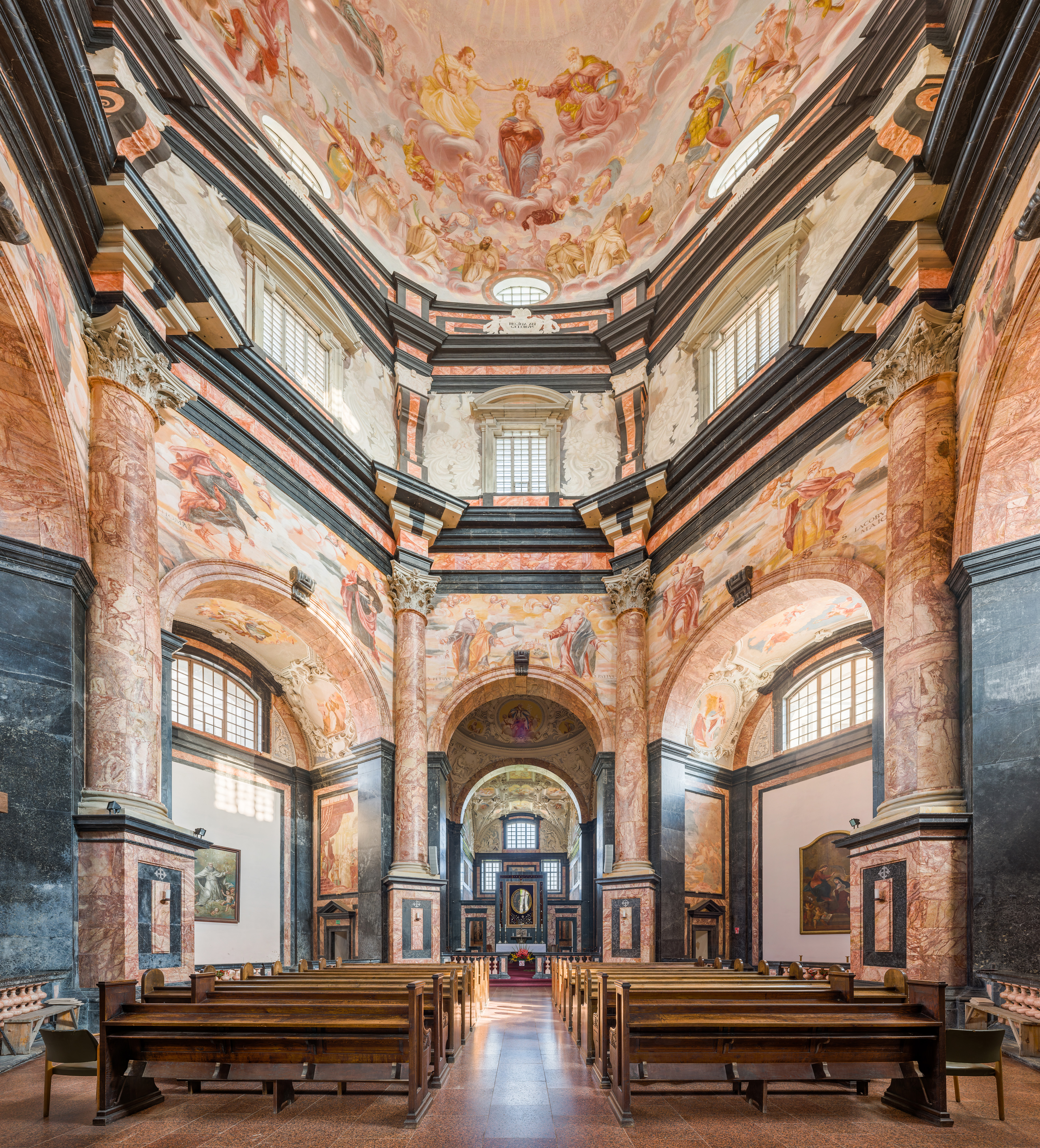
Interior of the Church of the Visitation in the Pažaislis Monastery, designed by Pietro Puttini, Carlo Puttini and Giovanni Battista Frediani (completed in 1690)

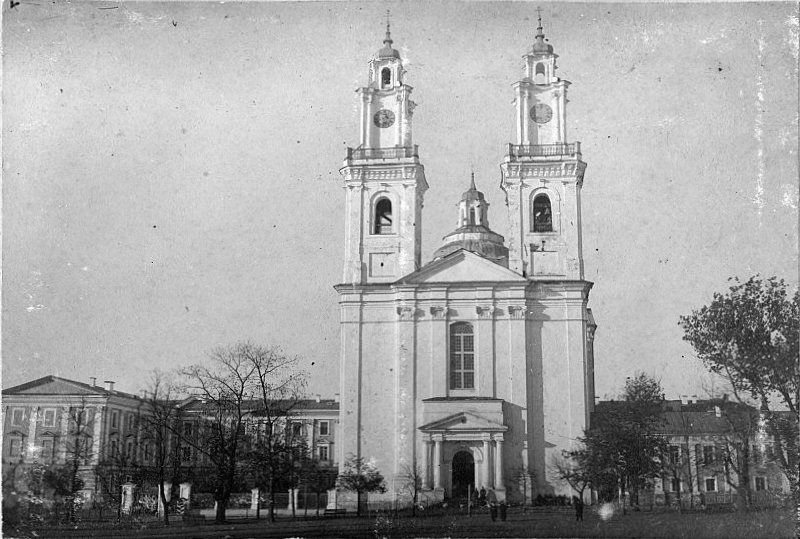
Saint Stephen Church and the Jesuit Collegium in Polotsk. The church was destroyed by Soviet authorities in 1964

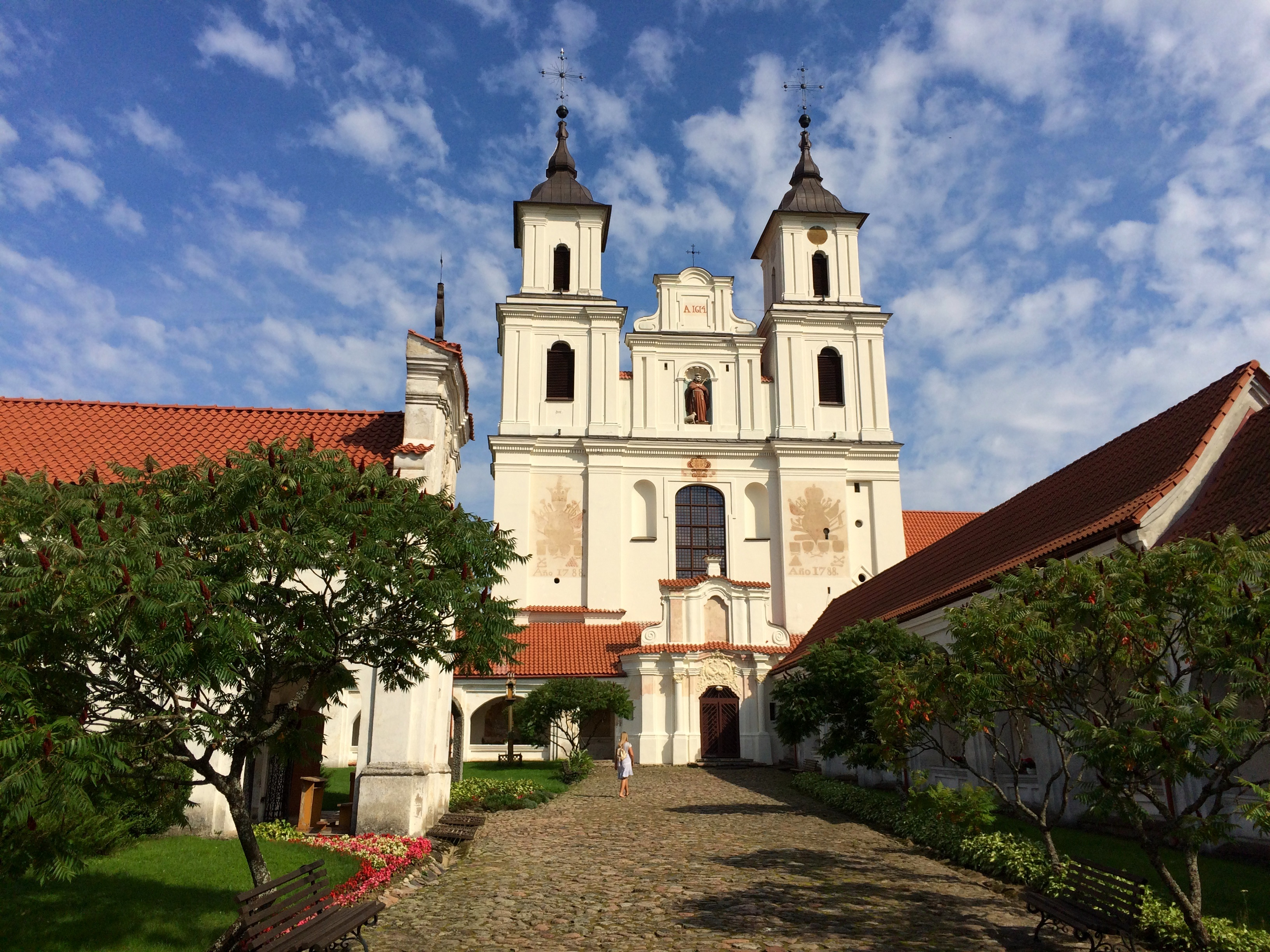
Church of the Blessed Virgin Mary in Tytuvėnai with a Late Baroque twin-tower façade (completed in 1735)

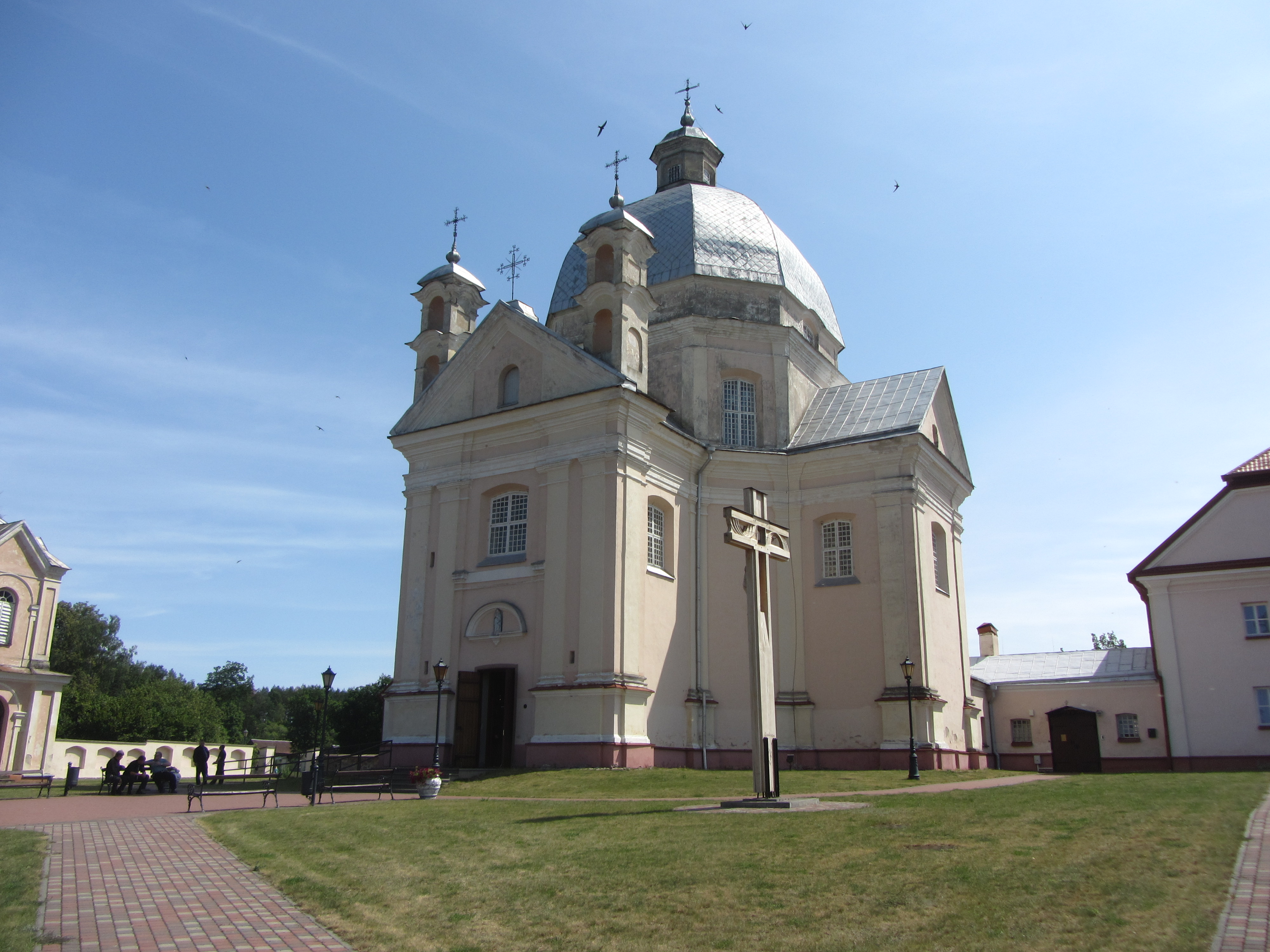
Church of the Holy Trinity, Liškiava Monastery, completed in 1741

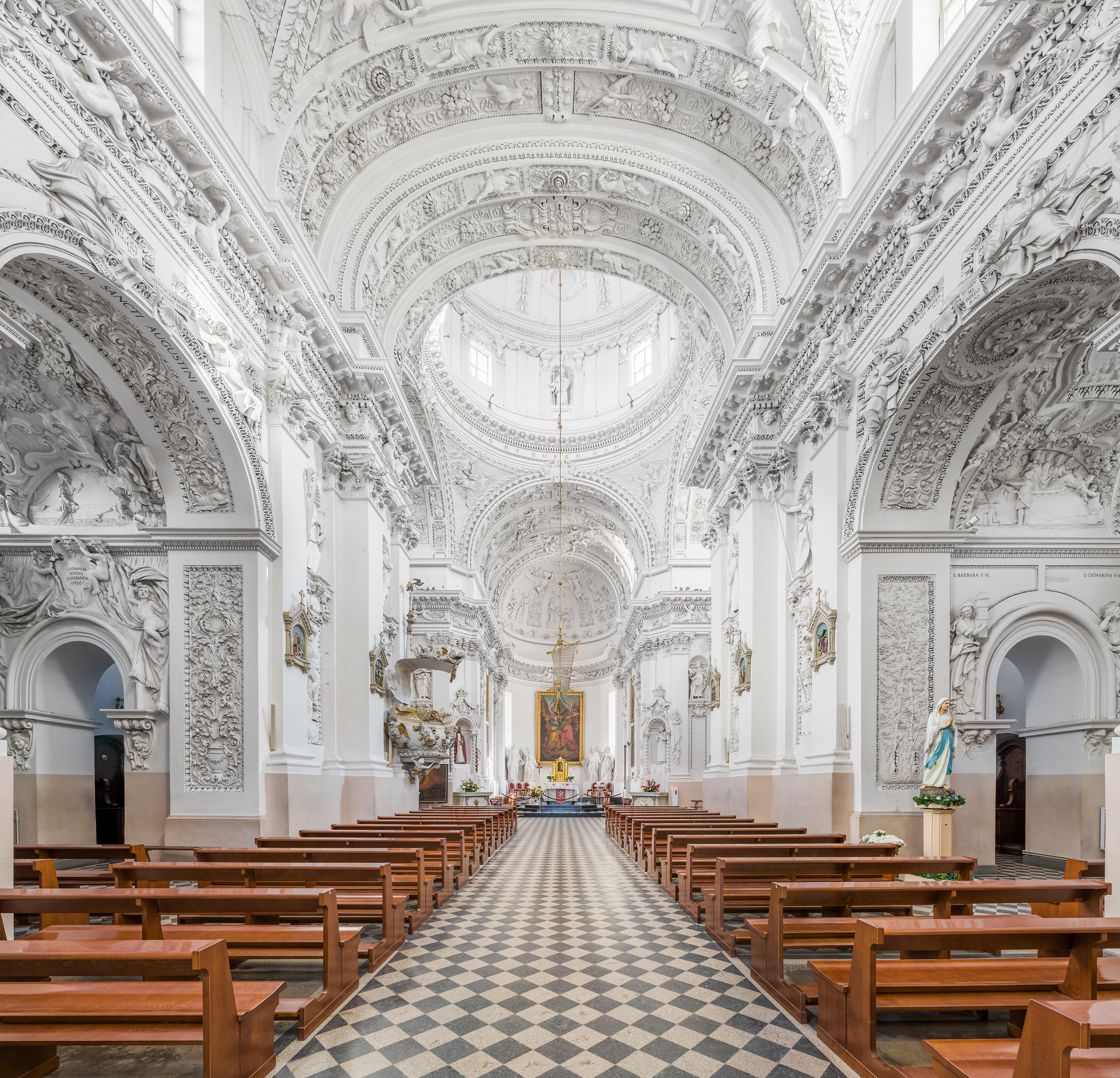
Interior of the Church of St. Peter and St. Paul, Vilnius, designed by Jan Zaor and Giambattista Frediani (completed in 1701)

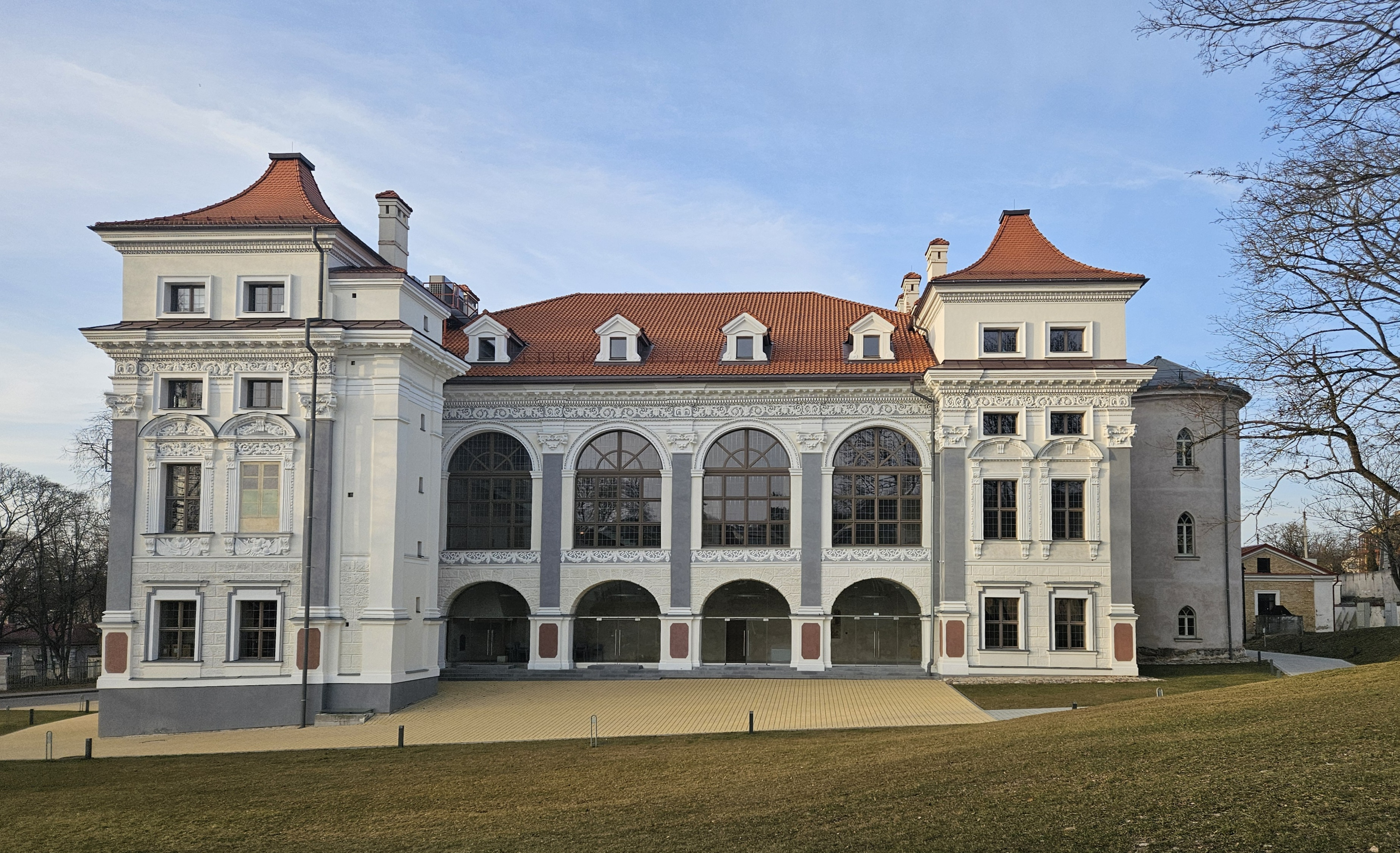
Sapieha Palace in Vilnius

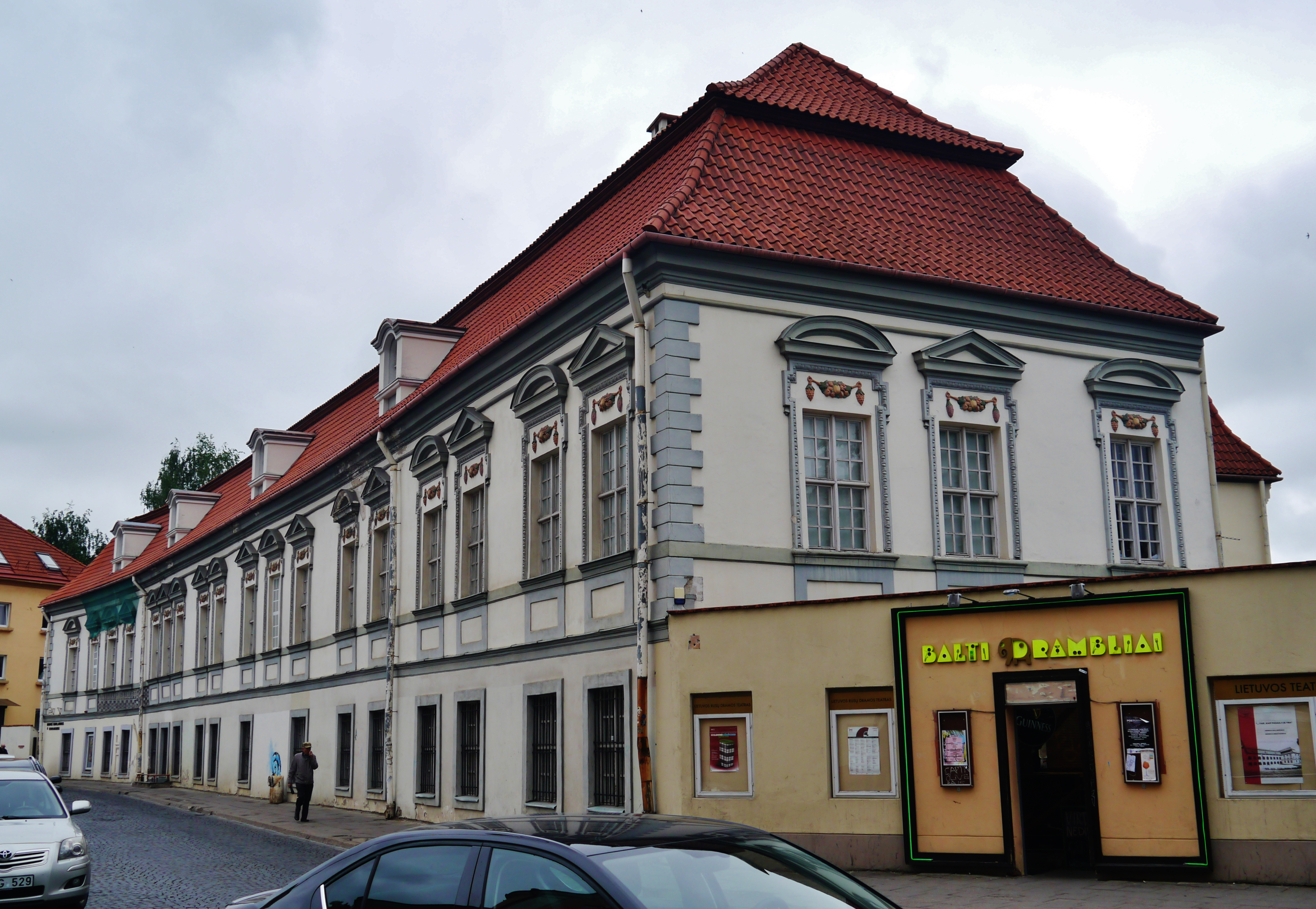
Minor Radvillas Palace in Vilnius

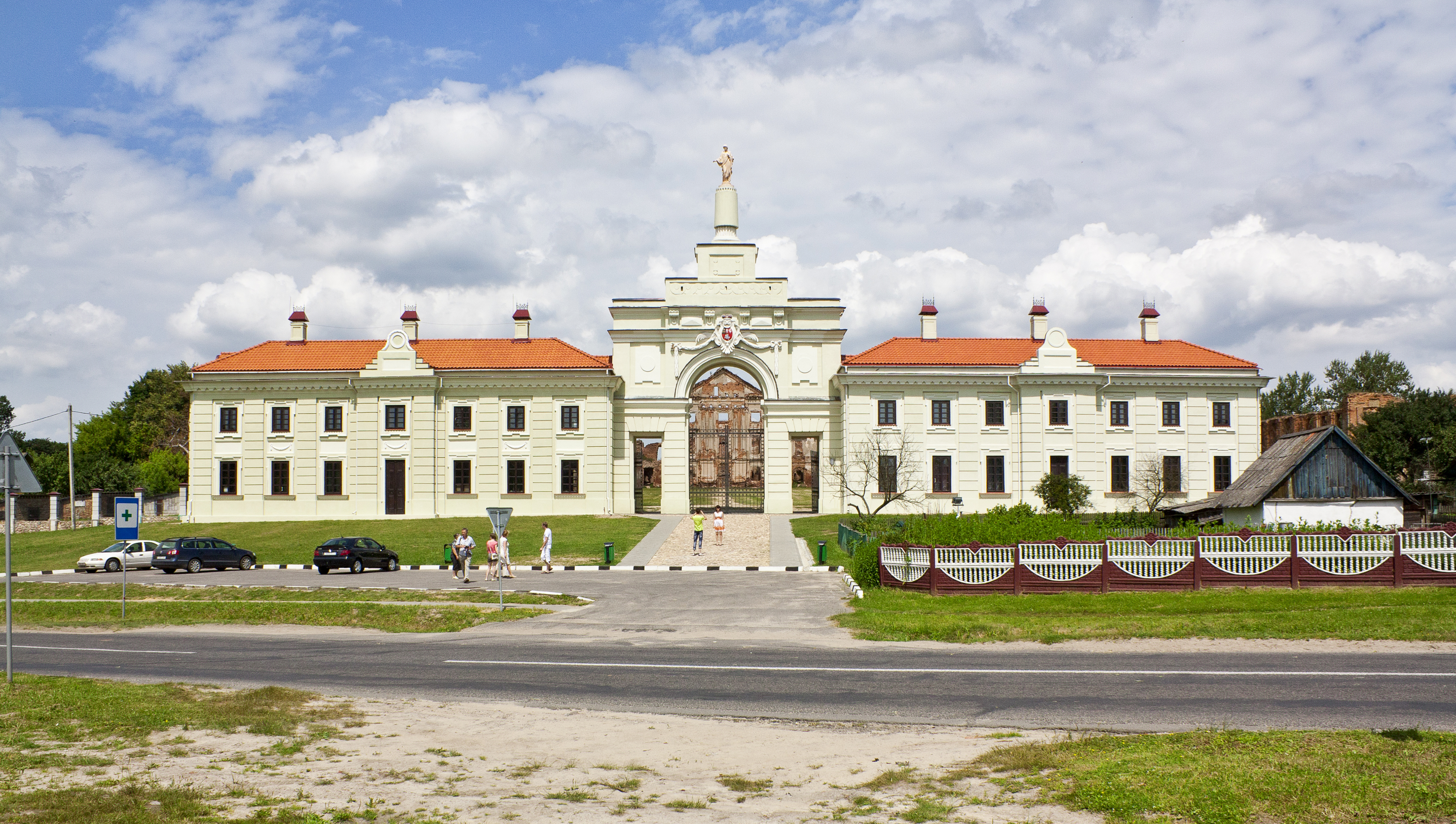
The main gate of the Ruzhany Palace

The Late Baroque (1730s–1780s) gave rise to a distinct regional direction known as Vilnian Baroque (or Vilnius Baroque). It formed mainly in sacral architecture following the reconstruction of churches after the Great Northern War and the fires in Vilnius in 1737 and 1747. The style is characterized by pictorial silhouettes, verticalism of proportions, tall and slender towers, openwork and plasticity of facades, and optical effects.

The most prominent architect of this school was Johann Christoph Glaubitz, who rebuilt the Church of St. Johns, St. Catherine, and others. Other notable architects included Thomas Zebrowski, Paolo Fontana, Ludwig Hryncewicz, Aleksander Osikiewicz, Pietro Perti, and Giovanni Maria Galli. The style was widely adopted by the Ruthenian Uniate Church, creating unique monuments with telescoping towers (e.g., Saint Sophia Cathedral in Polotsk, Bierazviečča, Zhyrovichy Monastery, and churches in Baruny, Talachyn, and Volna). Vilnian Baroque aesthetics also spread to Orthodox churches (e.g., in Mahiliou) and secular buildings like the town halls in Vitebsk and Kaunas.

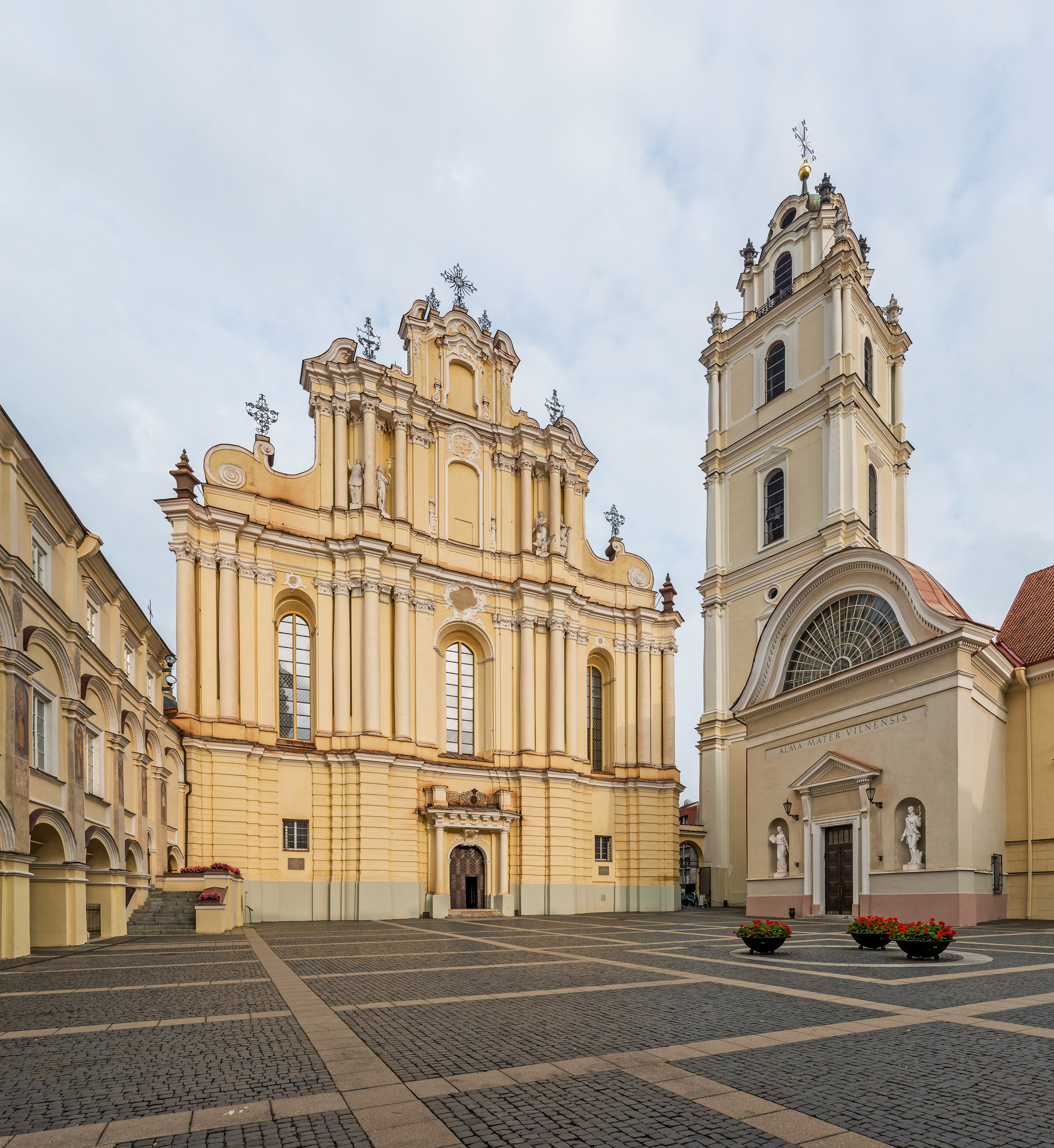
Church of St. Johns, Vilnius, reconstructed in the 18th century by Johann Christoph Glaubitz and Thomas Zebrowski

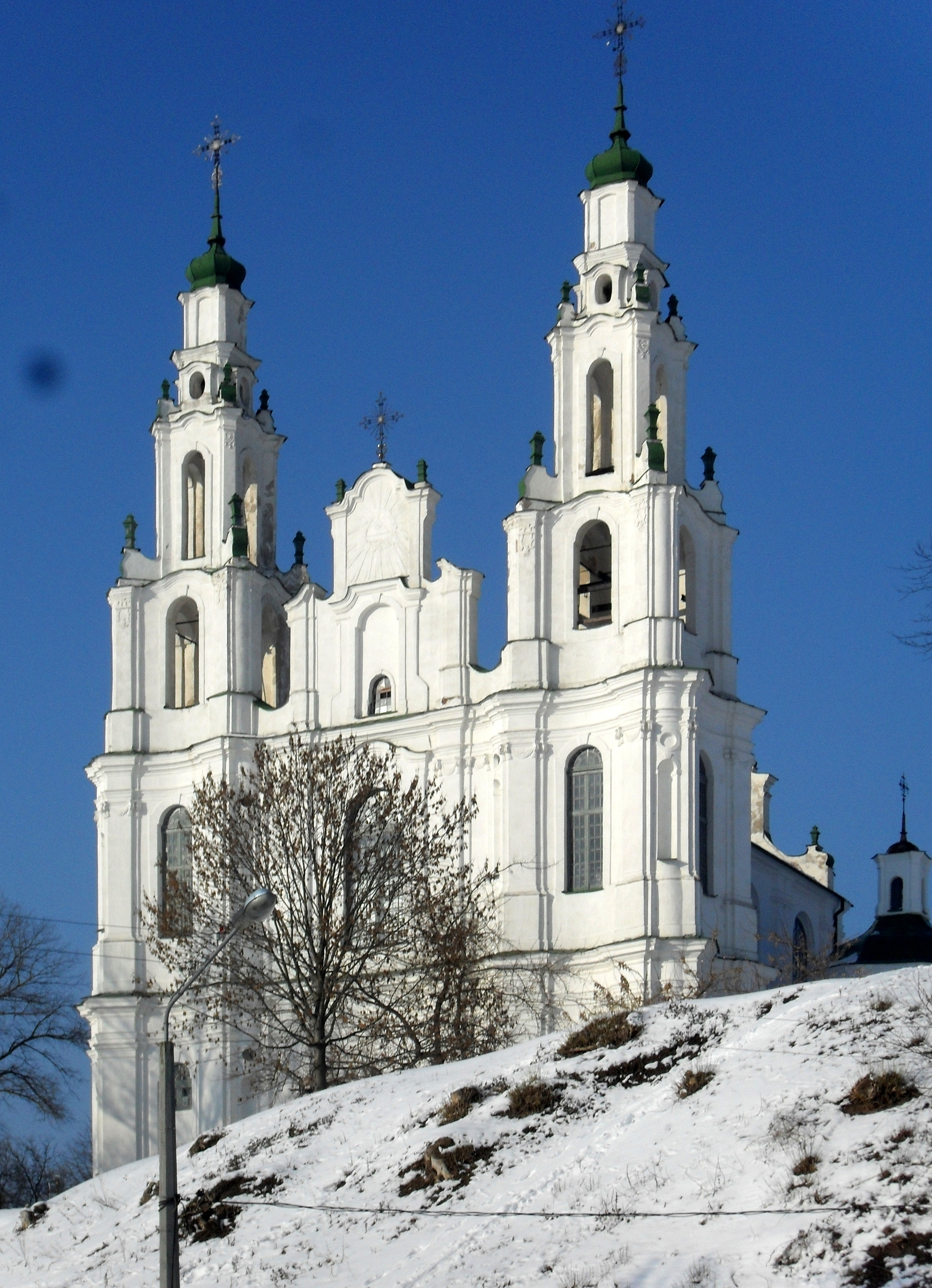
Saint Sophia Cathedral in Polotsk, reconstructed in the mid-18th century in the Vilnian Baroque style

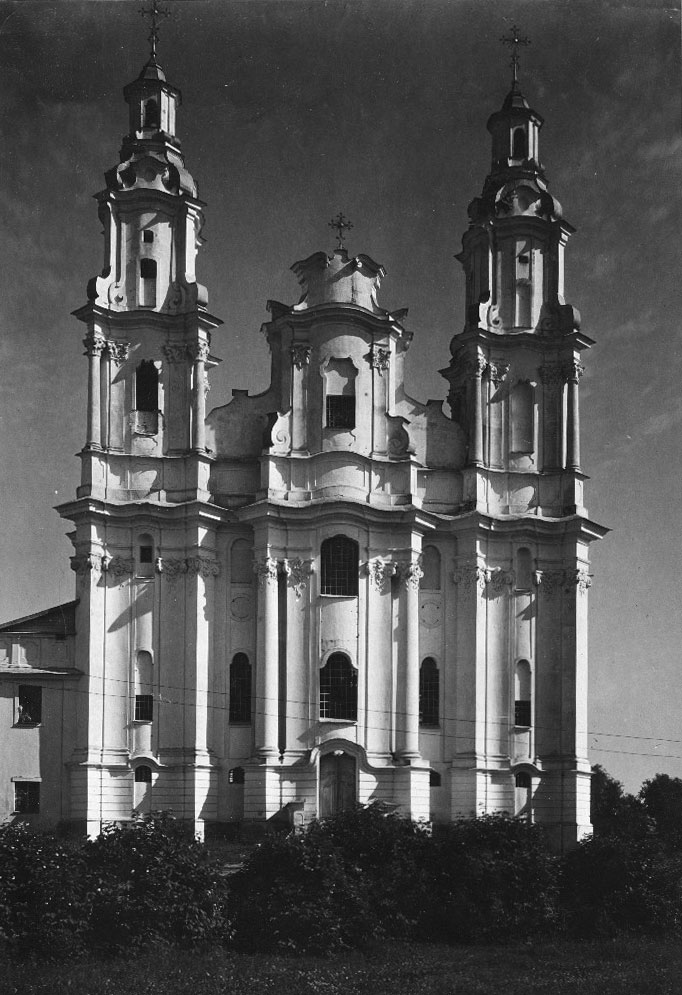
Church of Saints Peter and Paul in Bierazviečča (Hlybokaye). A masterpiece of Vilnian Baroque, destroyed by Soviet authorities

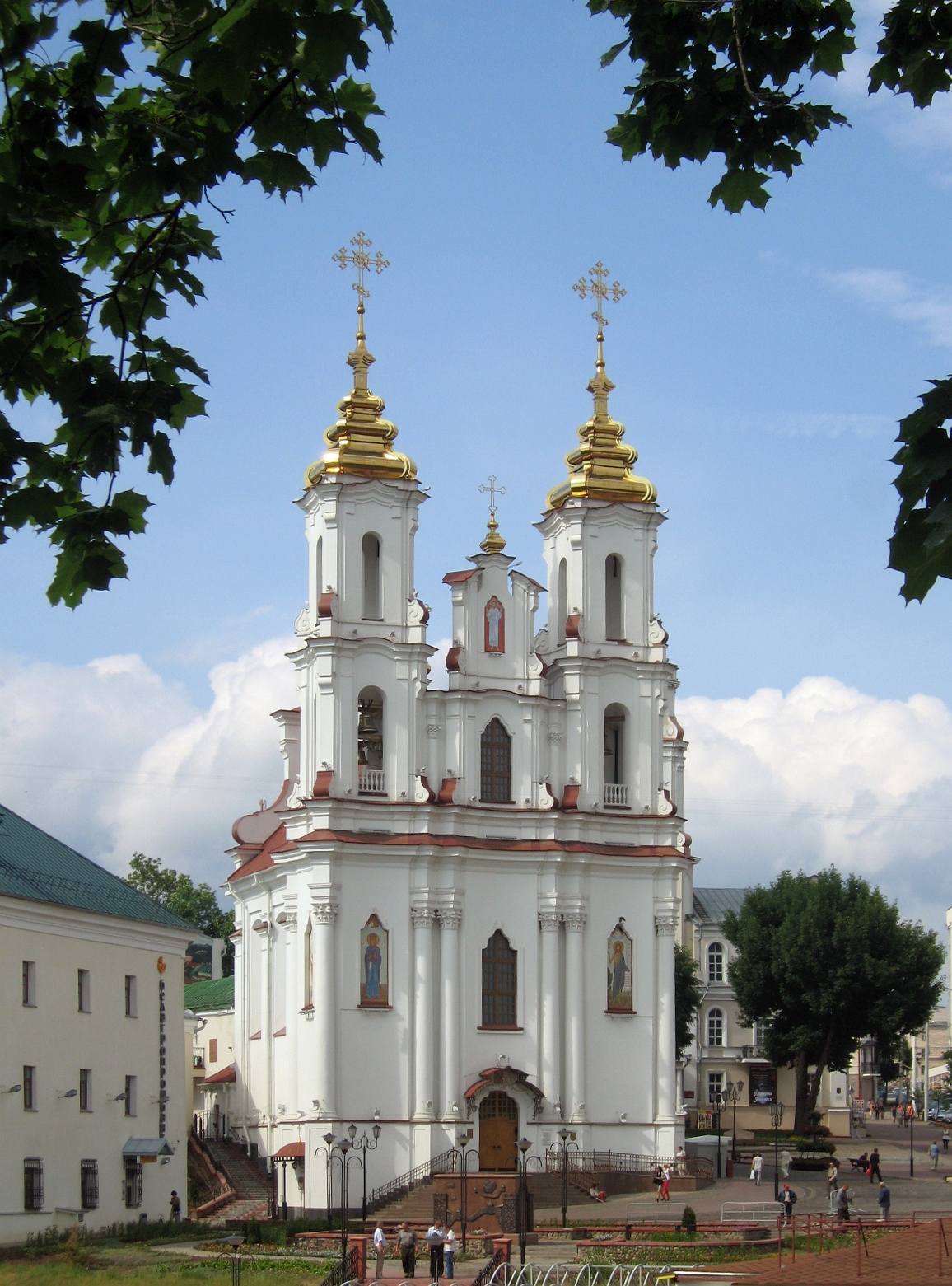
Resurrection Church (Market Church) in Vitebsk, built in the 1740s–1750s

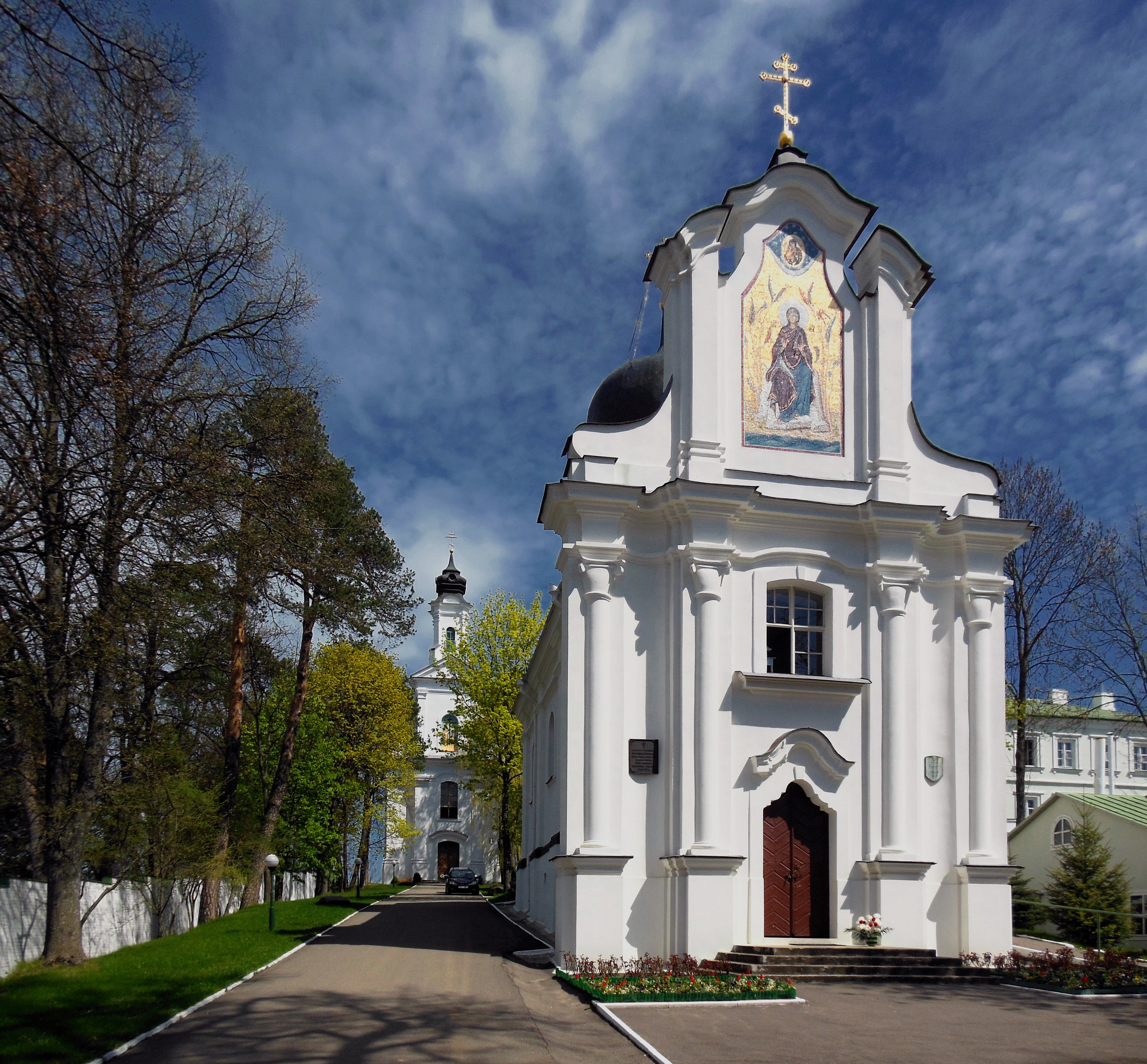
Epiphany and Holy Cross Churches in the Zhyrovichy Monastery

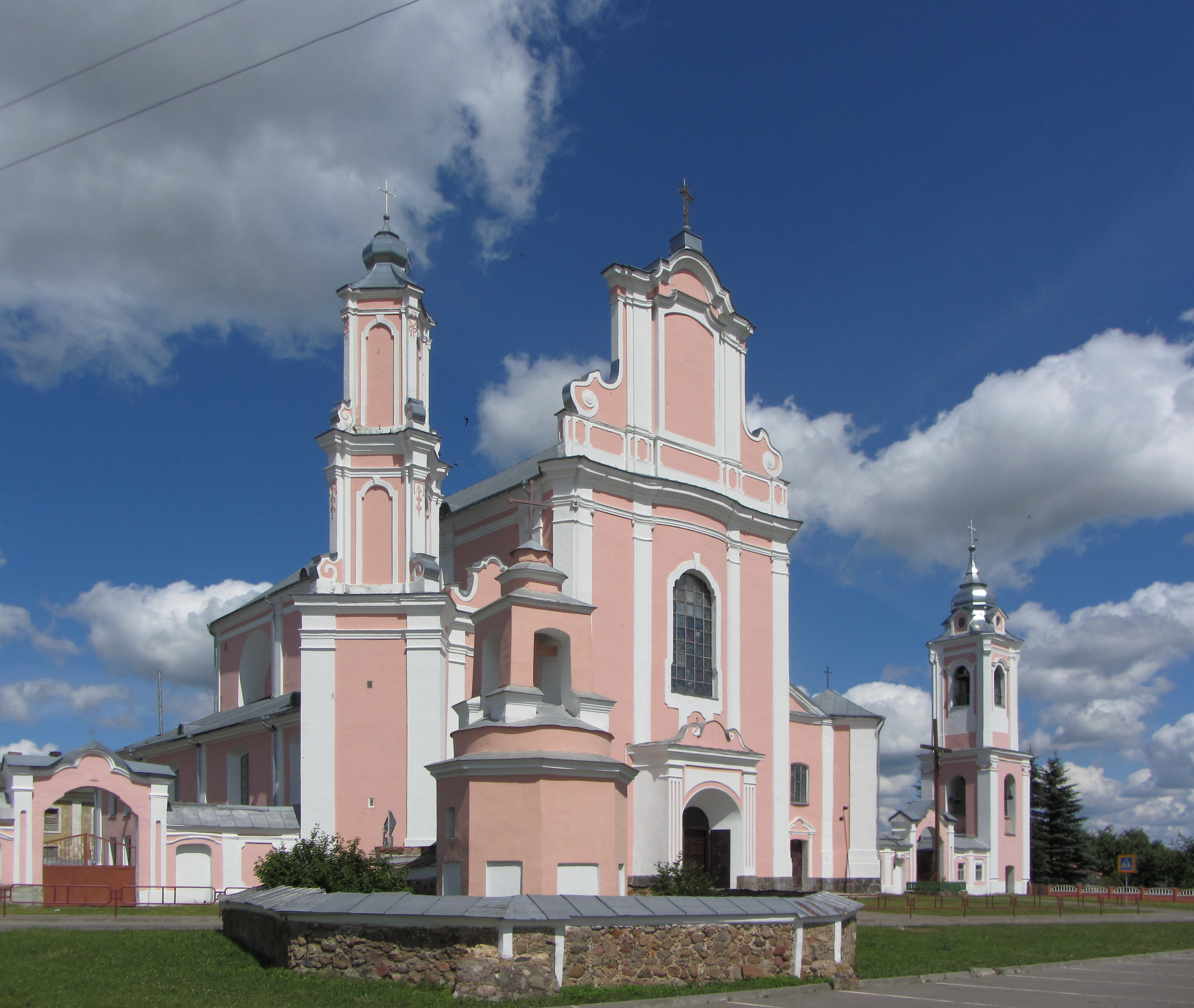
Church of Saints Peter and Paul and the Basilian monastery in Baruny

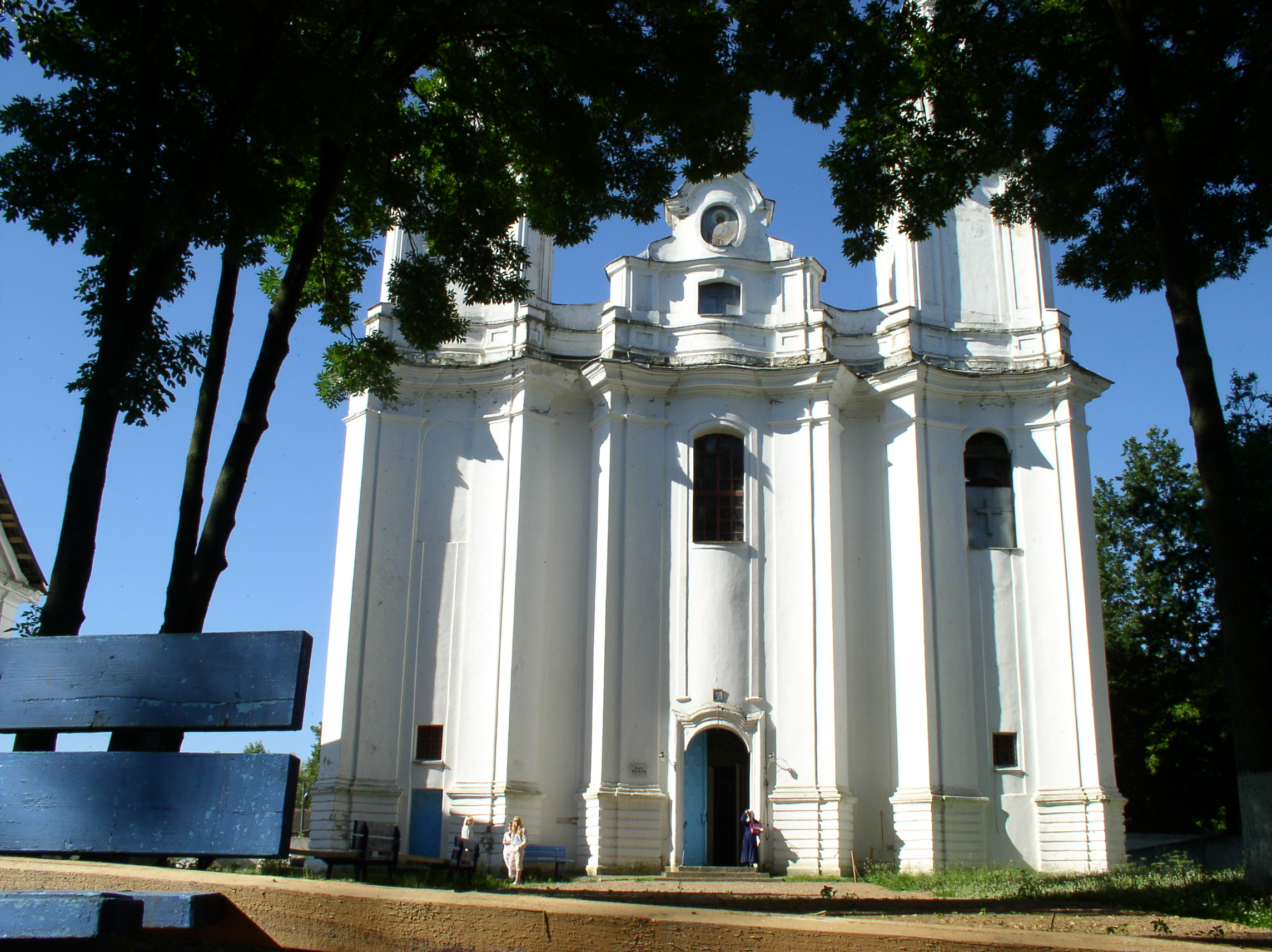
Church of the Protection of the Holy Virgin in Talachyn

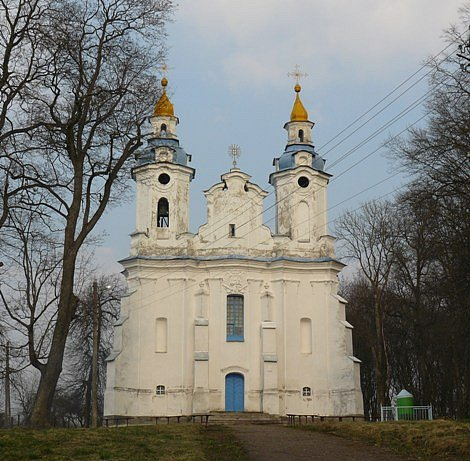
Church of the Holy Trinity in Volna

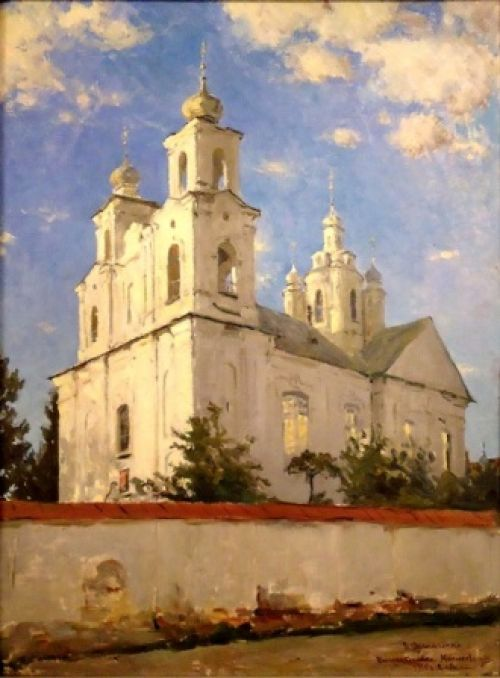
Transfiguration Monastery in Mogilev. The church and other buildings were damaged in WWII and later demolished

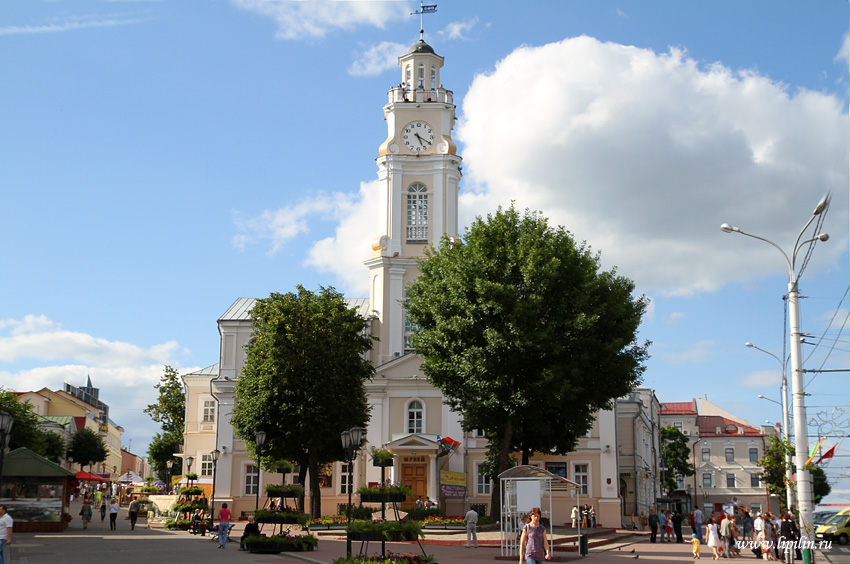
Vitebsk Town Hall, completed in 1775

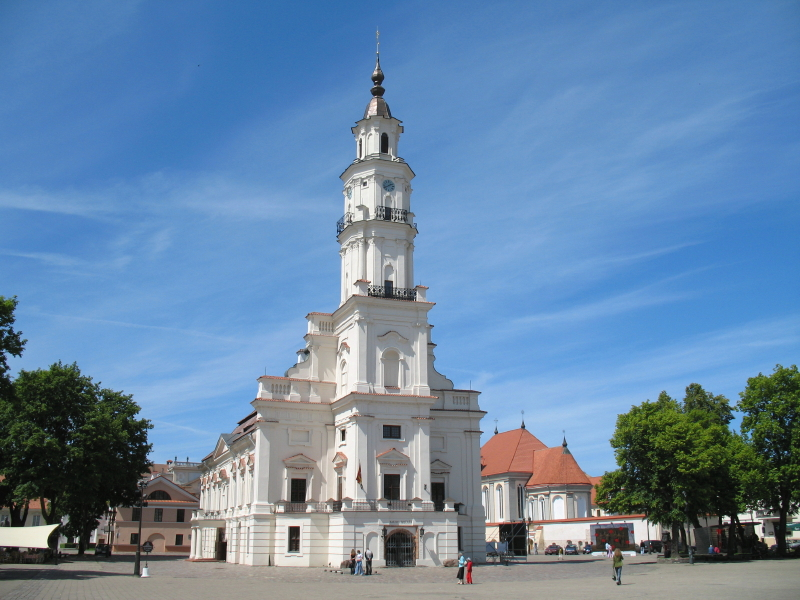
Kaunas Town Hall, reconstructed between 1771–1780 by architect Jan Mateker

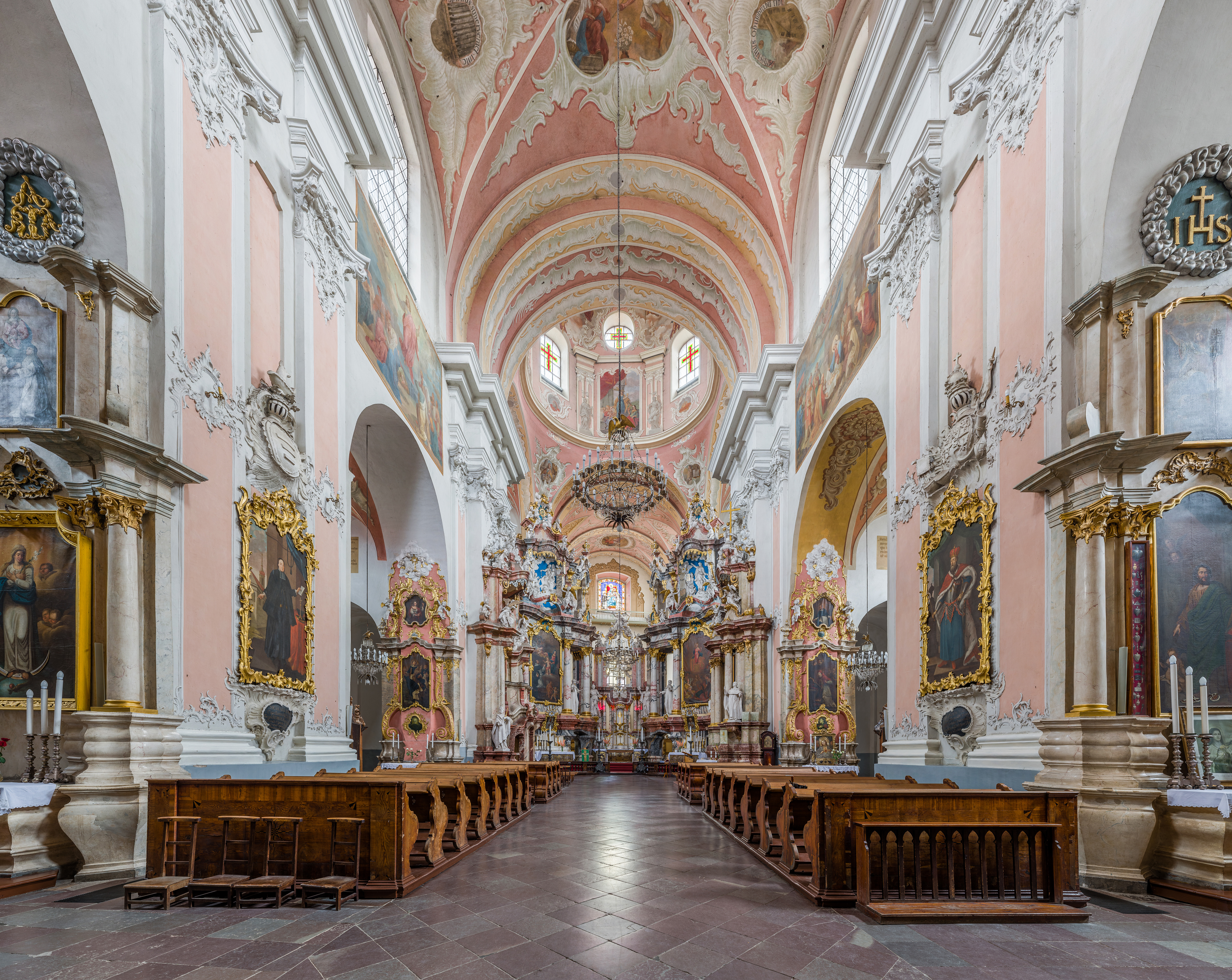
Interior of the Dominican Church of the Holy Spirit in Vilnius, reconstructed in a Late Baroque style in the 17th century

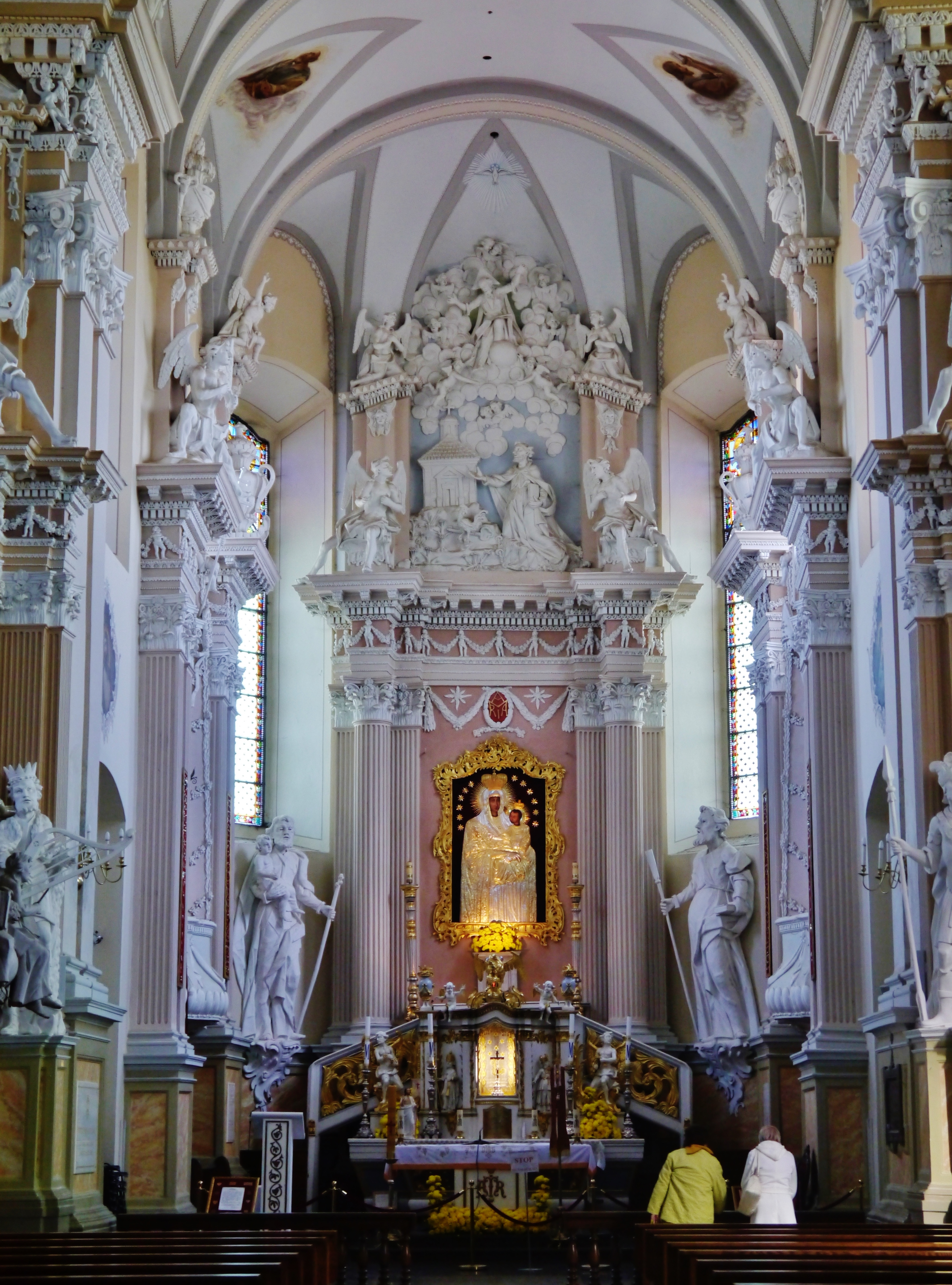
Interior of the Basilica of the Nativity of the Blessed Virgin Mary, Šiluva (built in 1760–1772) with the Our Lady of Šiluva in the main altar

The specific nature of wood as a building material in the region led to the development of unique Baroque forms in wooden architecture, characterized by tiered towers and specific construction techniques (e.g., the St. George Church in Valavieĺ and the St. Michael Church in Rubieĺ). By the late 18th century, Baroque began to be replaced by Classicism, often resulting in monuments that combined elements of both styles (e.g., Sviatsk Palace).

==== Central Europe ====
Many of the most extraordinary buildings of the Late Baroque were constructed in Austria, Germany, and Czechia. In Austria, the leading figure was Fischer von Erlach, who built the Karlskirche, the largest church of Vienna, to glorify the Habsburg emperors. These works sometimes borrowed elements from Versailles combined with elements of the Italian Baroque to create grandiose new effects, as in the Schwarzenberg Palace (1715). Johann Lukas von Hildebrandt used grand stairways and ellipses to achieve his effects at the upper and lower Belvedere Palace in Vienna (1714–1722). In The Abbey of Melk, Jakob Prandtauer used an abundance of polychrome marble and stucco, statuary and ceiling paintings to achieve harmonious and highly theatrical effects.

Another important figure of German Baroque was Balthasar Neumann (1687–1753), whose works included the Würzburg Residence for the Prince-Bishops of Würzburg, with its famous staircase.

In Bohemia, the leading Baroque architect was Christoph Dientzenhofer, whose building featured complex curves and counter-curves and elliptical forms, making Prague, like Vienna, a capital of the late Baroque.

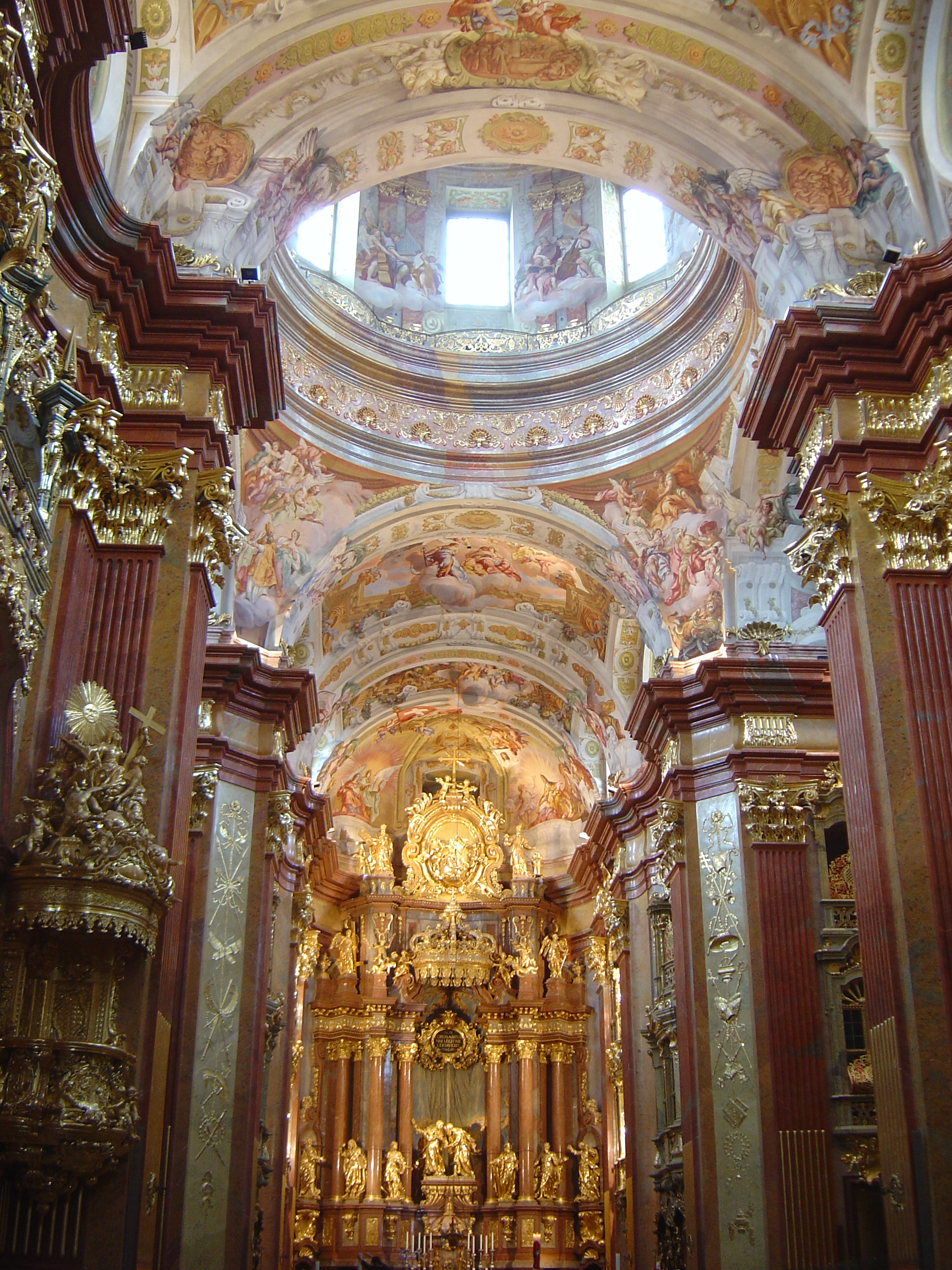
Interior of the church of the Abbey of Melk by Jakob Prandtauer (1702–1736)

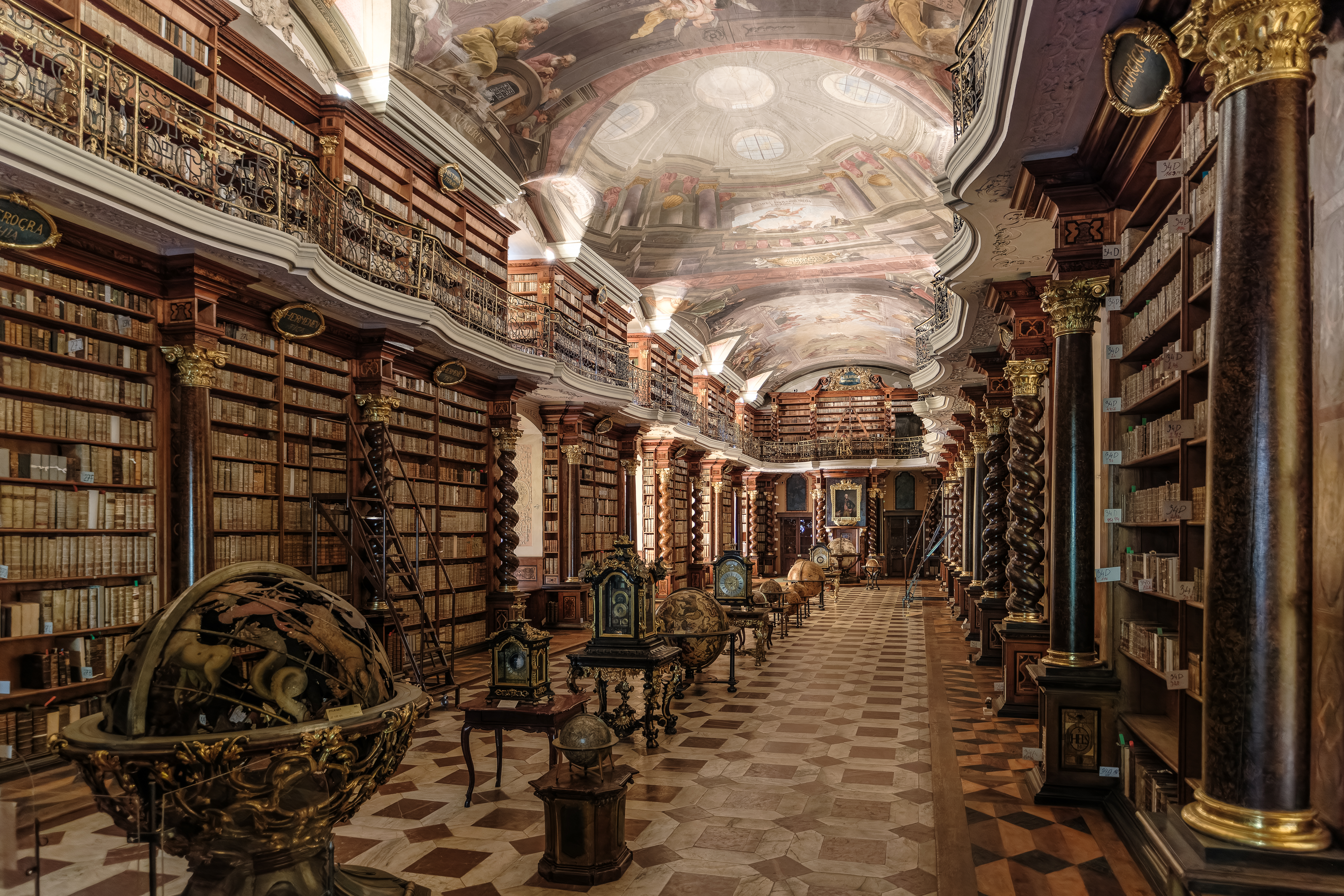
Library of the Clementinum, the Jesuit university in Prague (1722)

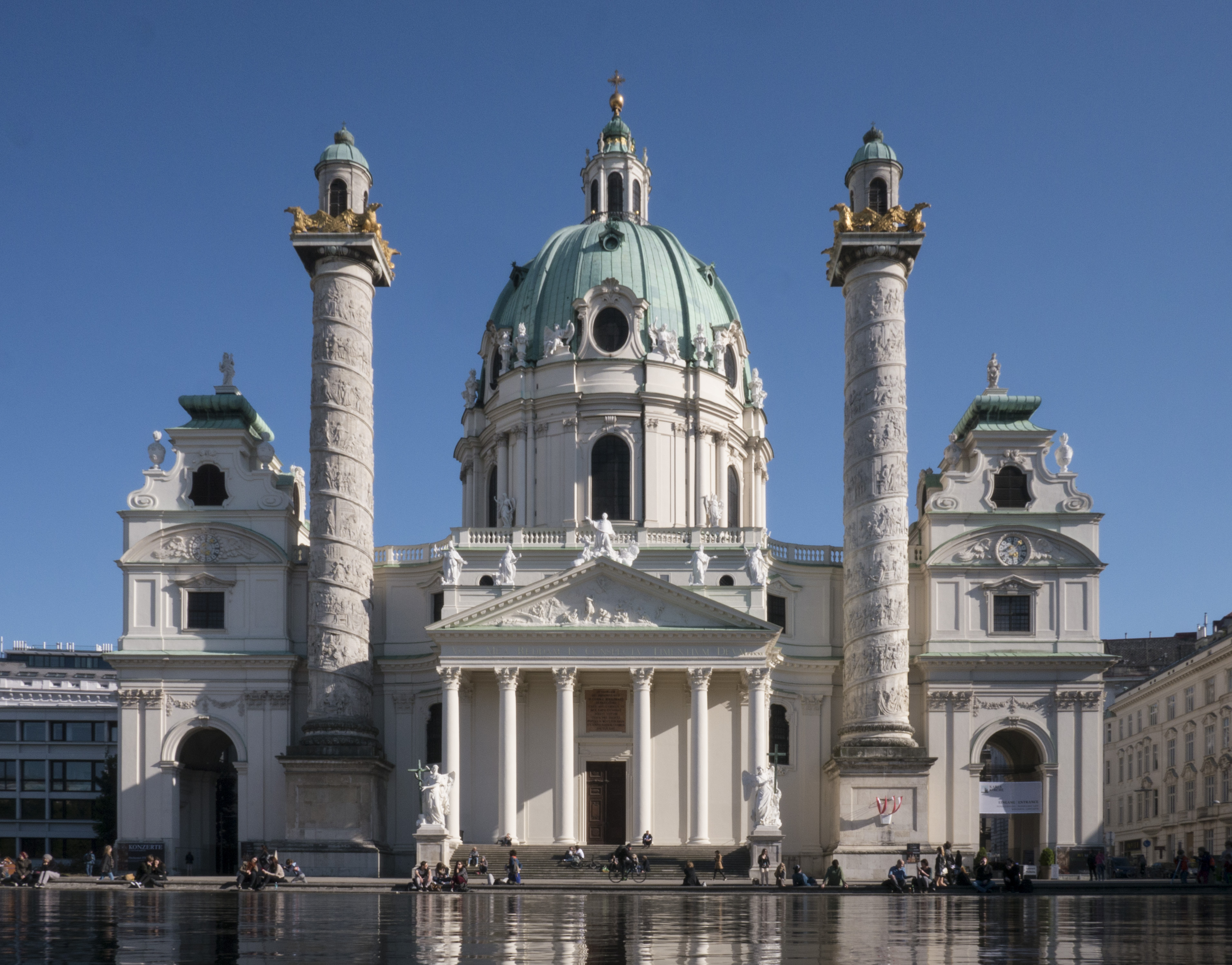
Karlskirche, Vienna by Fischer von Erlach (consecrated 1737)

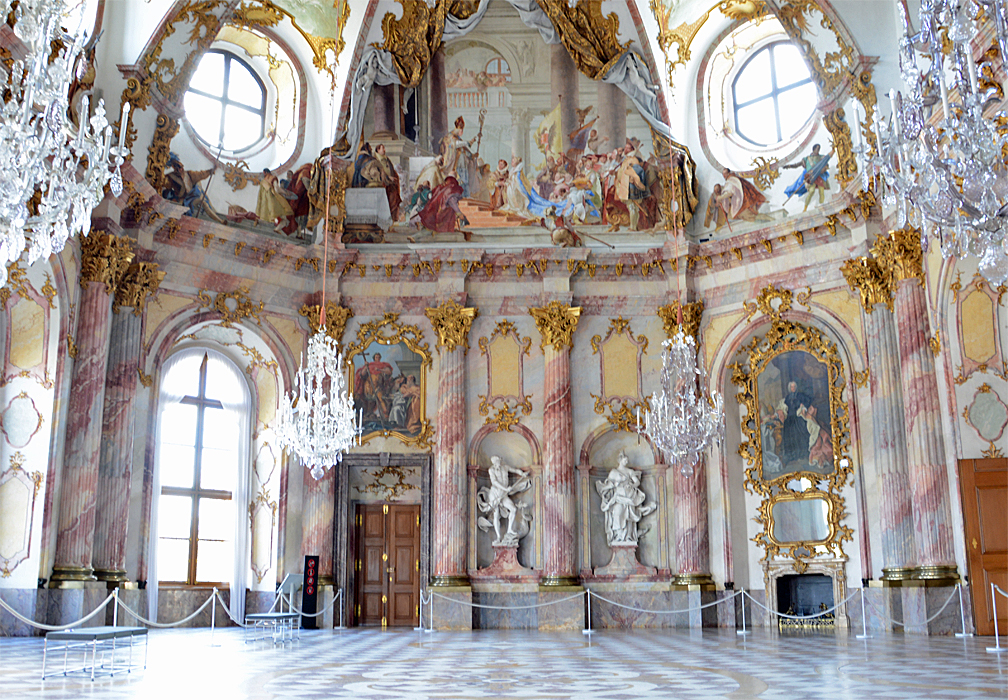
Kaisersaal of Würzburg Residence by Balthasar Neumann (1749–51)

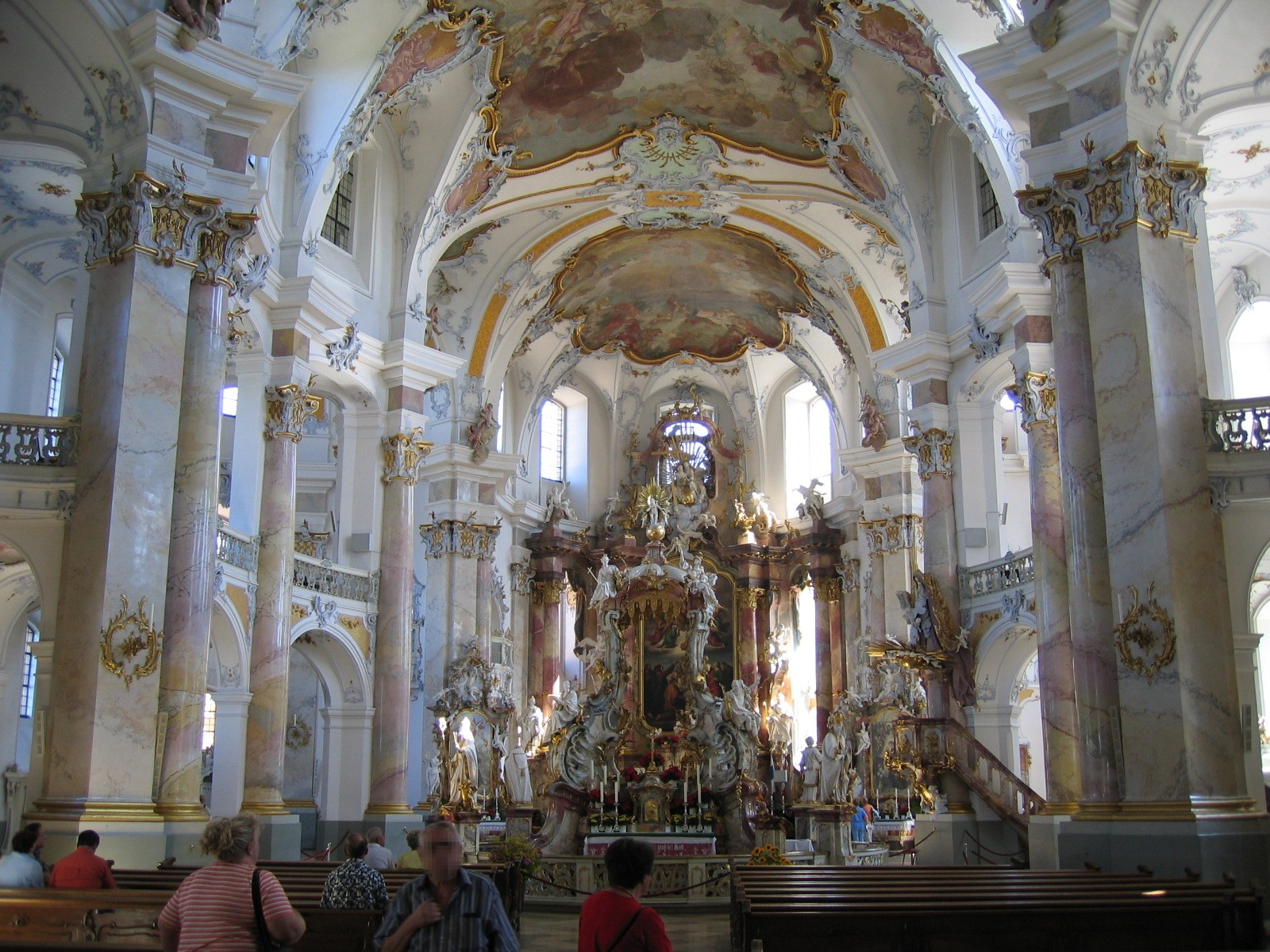
Basilica of the Fourteen Holy Helpers by Balthasar Neumann (1743–1772)

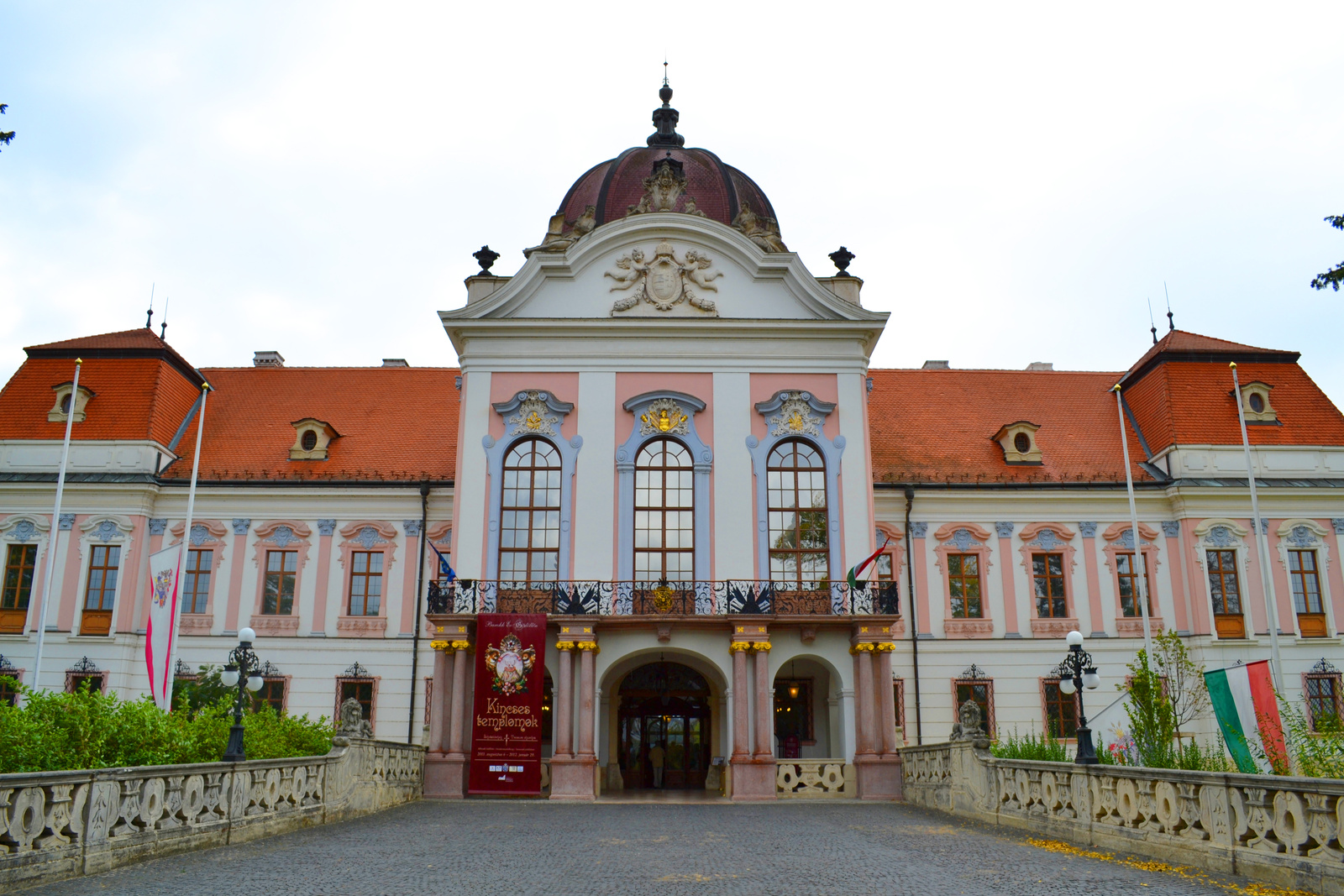
Royal Palace of Gödöllő (Hungary) by András Mayerhoffer (1730s–1785)

==== Spain ====
Political and economic crises in the 17th century largely delayed the arrival of the Baroque in Spain until the late period, though the Jesuits strongly promoted it. Its early characteristics were a lavish exterior contrasting with a relatively simple interior and multiple spaces. They carefully planned lighting in the interior to give an impression of mystery. Early 18th century, Notable Spanish examples included the new west façade of Santiago de Compostela Cathedral, (1738–50), with its spectacular towers, by Fernando de Casas Novoa. In Seville, Leonardo de Figueroa was the creator of the Palacio de San Telmo, with a façade inspired by the Italian Baroque. The most ornate works of the Spanish Baroque were made by Jose Benito de Churriguera in Madrid and Salamanca. In his work, the buildings are nearly overwhelmed by the ornament of gilded wood, gigantic twisting columns, and sculpted vegetation. His two brothers, Joaquin and Alberto, also made important, if less ornamented, contributions to what became known simply as the Churrigueresque style.

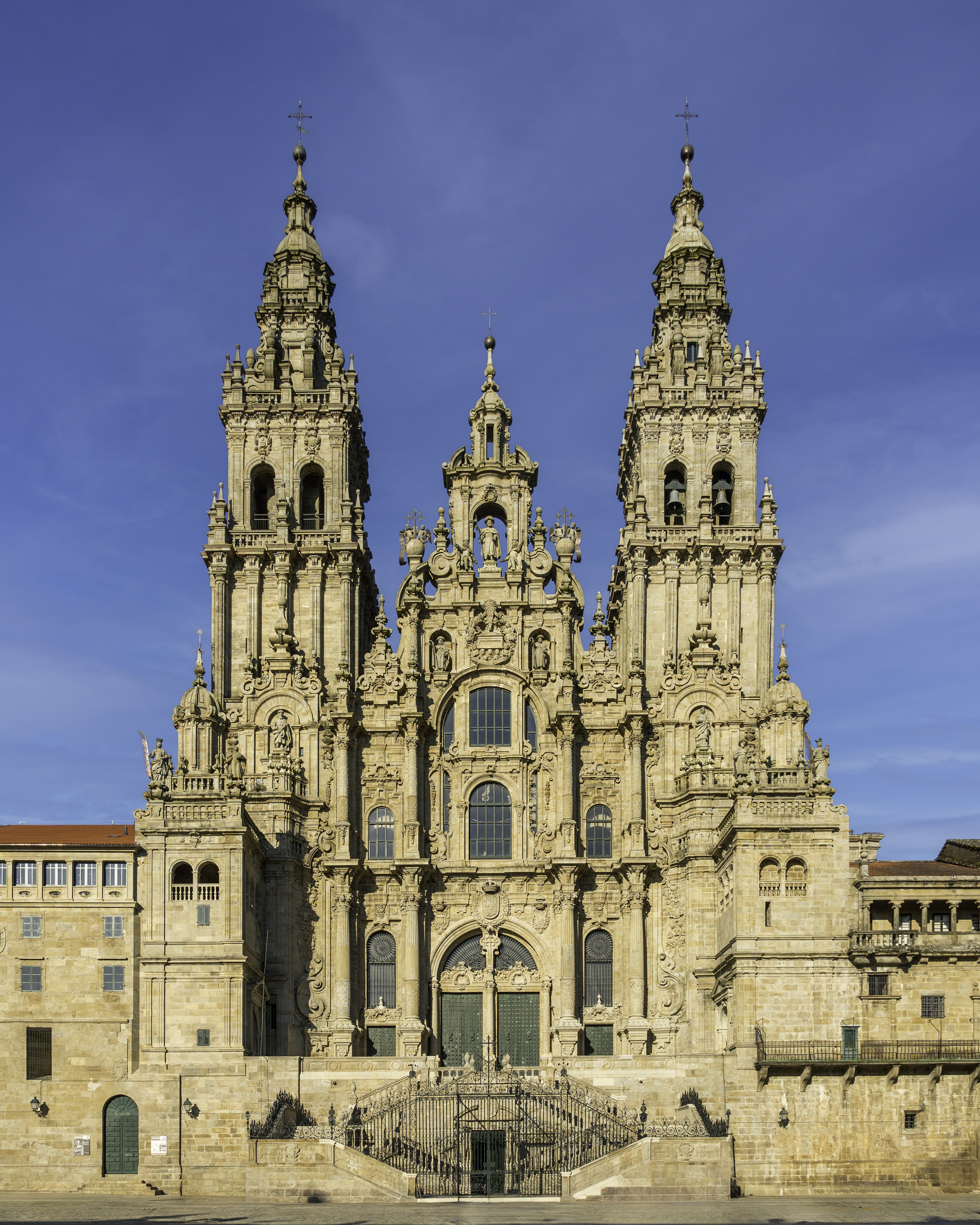
Late Baroque façade, Cathedral of Santiago de Compostela (1738–1750)

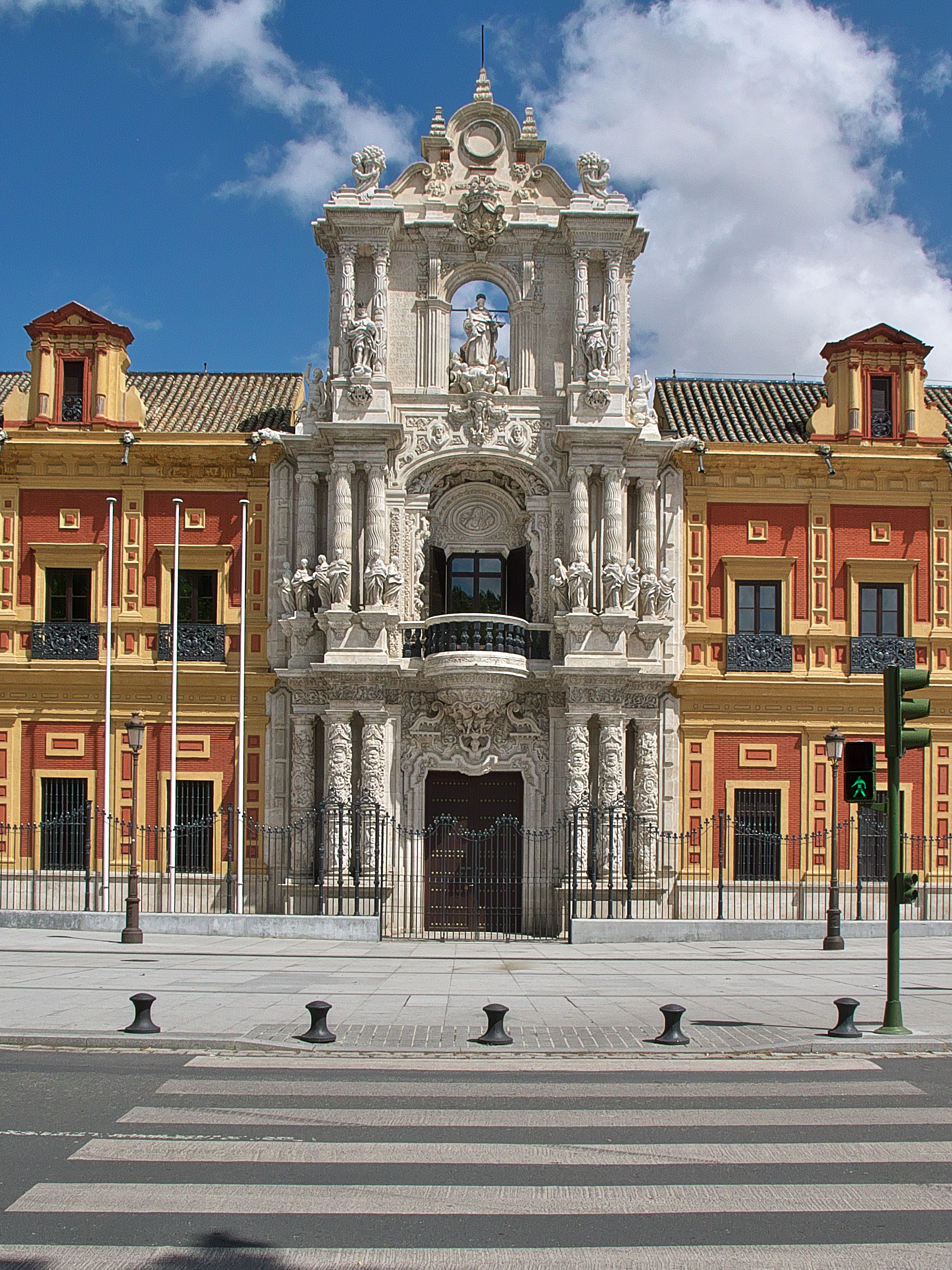
Palacio de San Telmo in Seville by Leonardo de Figueroa (1682–1754)

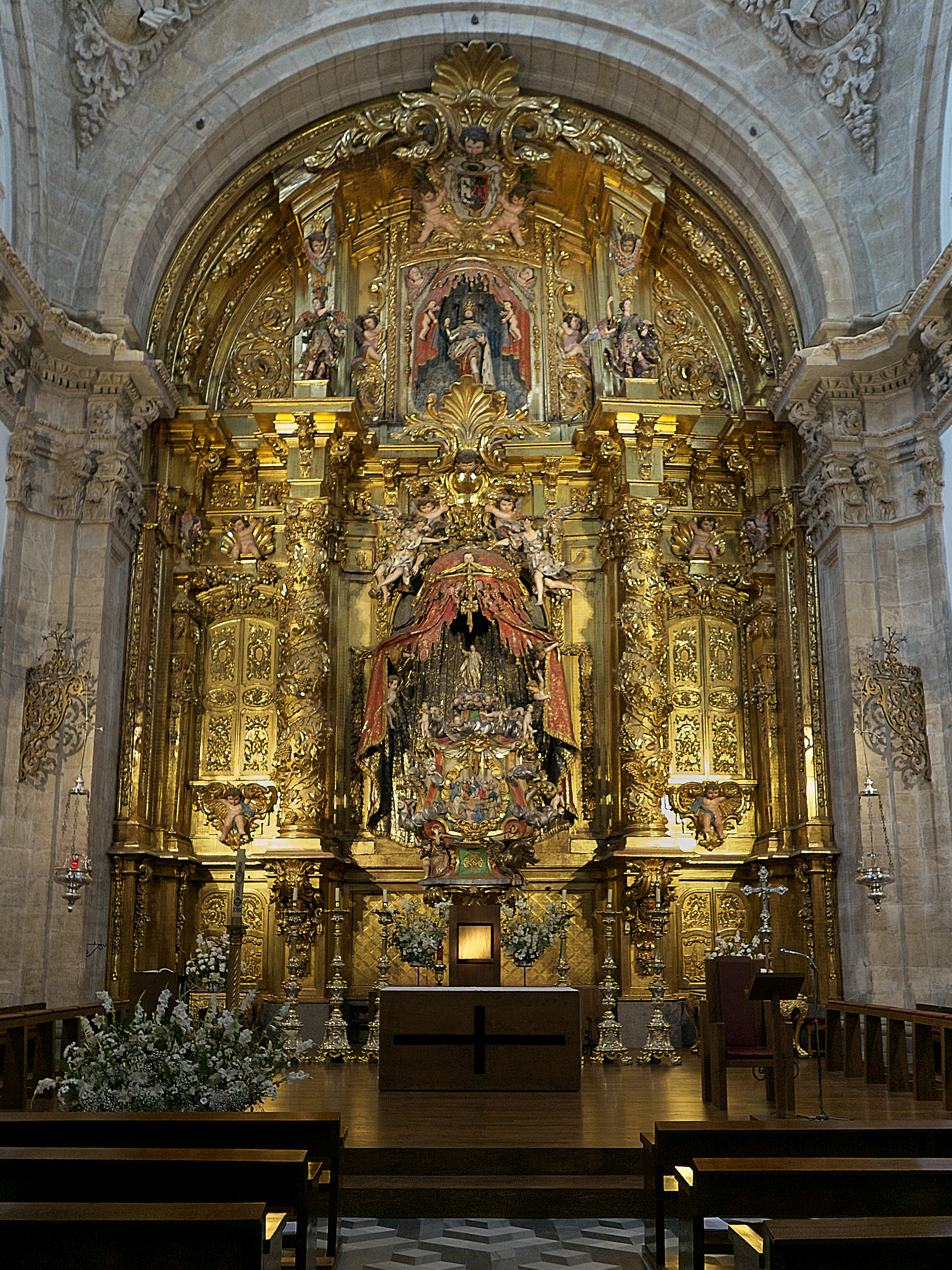
Retable in the Sagrario Chapel of Segovia Cathedral (1686) by Jose Benito de Churriguera, the earliest architect of the Churrigueresque style

==== Latin America and North America ====
The Baroque style was imported into Latin America in the 17th century by the Spanish and the Portuguese, particularly by the Jesuits for the construction of churches. The style was sometimes called Churrigueresque, after the family of Baroque architects in Salamanca. A particularly fine example is Zacatecas Cathedral in Zacatecas City, in north-central Mexico, with its lavishly sculpted façade and twin bell towers. Another important example is San Cristobal de las Casas in Mexico. A notable example in Brazil is the São Bento Monastery in Rio de Janeiro. begun in 1617, with additional decoration after 1668. The Metropolitan Tabernacle the Mexico City Metropolitan Cathedral, to the right of the main cathedral, built by Lorenzo Rodríguez between 1749 and 1760, to house the archives and vestments of the archbishop, and to receive visitors.

Portuguese colonial architecture was modeled after the architecture of Lisbon, different from the Spanish style. The most notable architect in Brazil was Aleijadinho, who was native of Brazil, half-Portuguese, and self-taught. His most famous work is the Church of Saint Francis of Assisi (Ouro Preto).

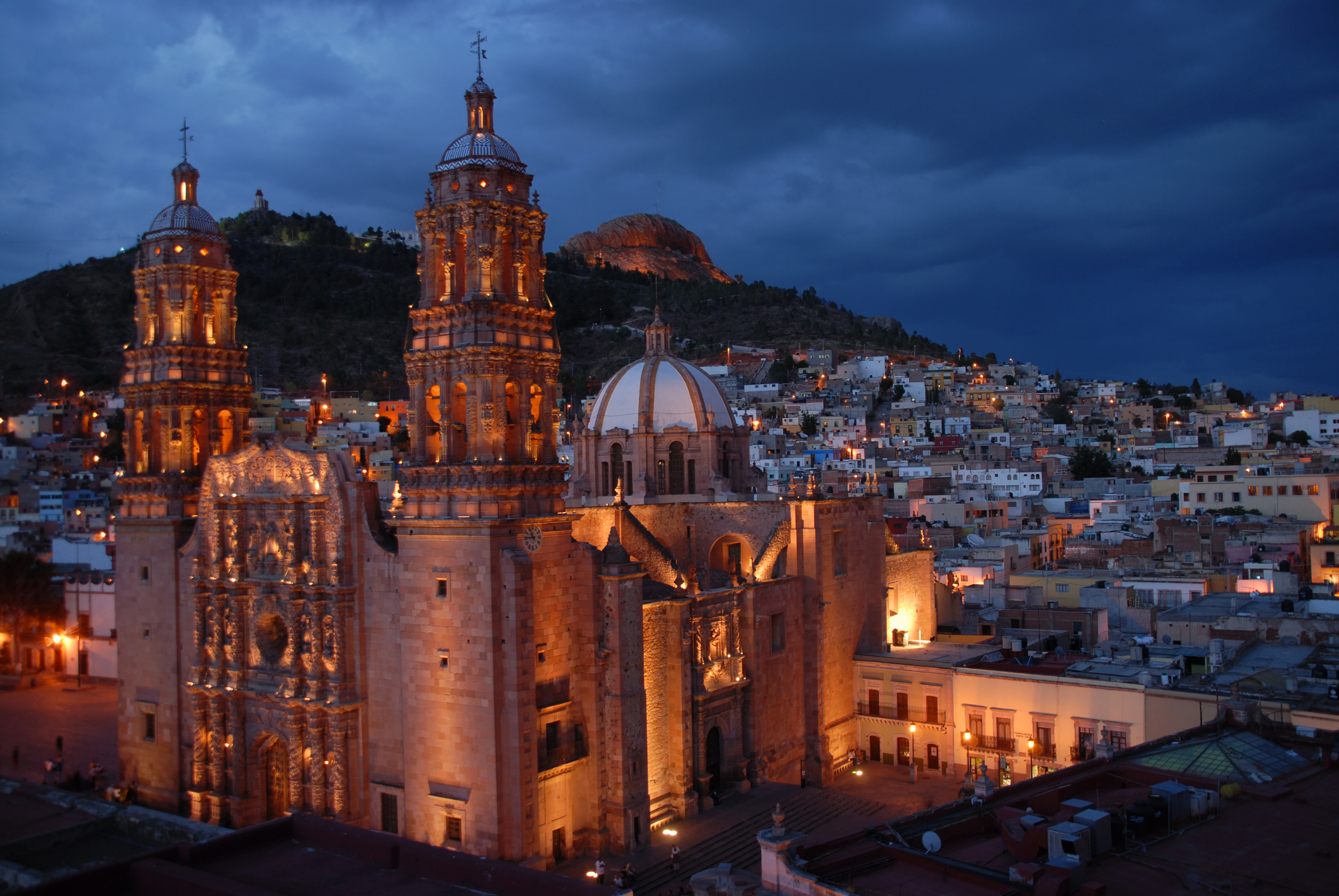
Cathedral Basilica of Zacatecas in Mexico, built between 1729-1772, an example of the Churrigueresque style

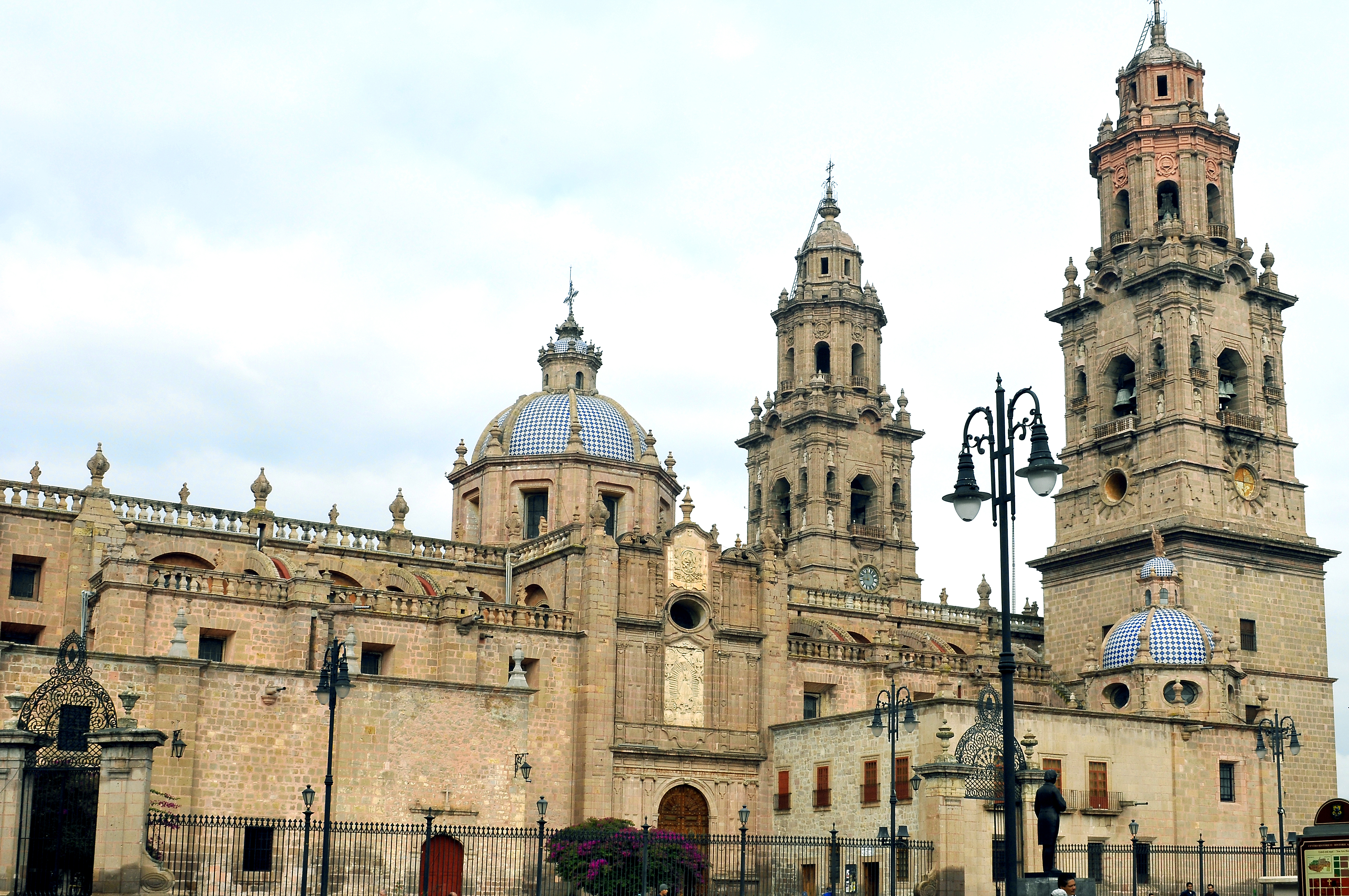
Cathedral of Morelia, Mexico. 1660-1744.

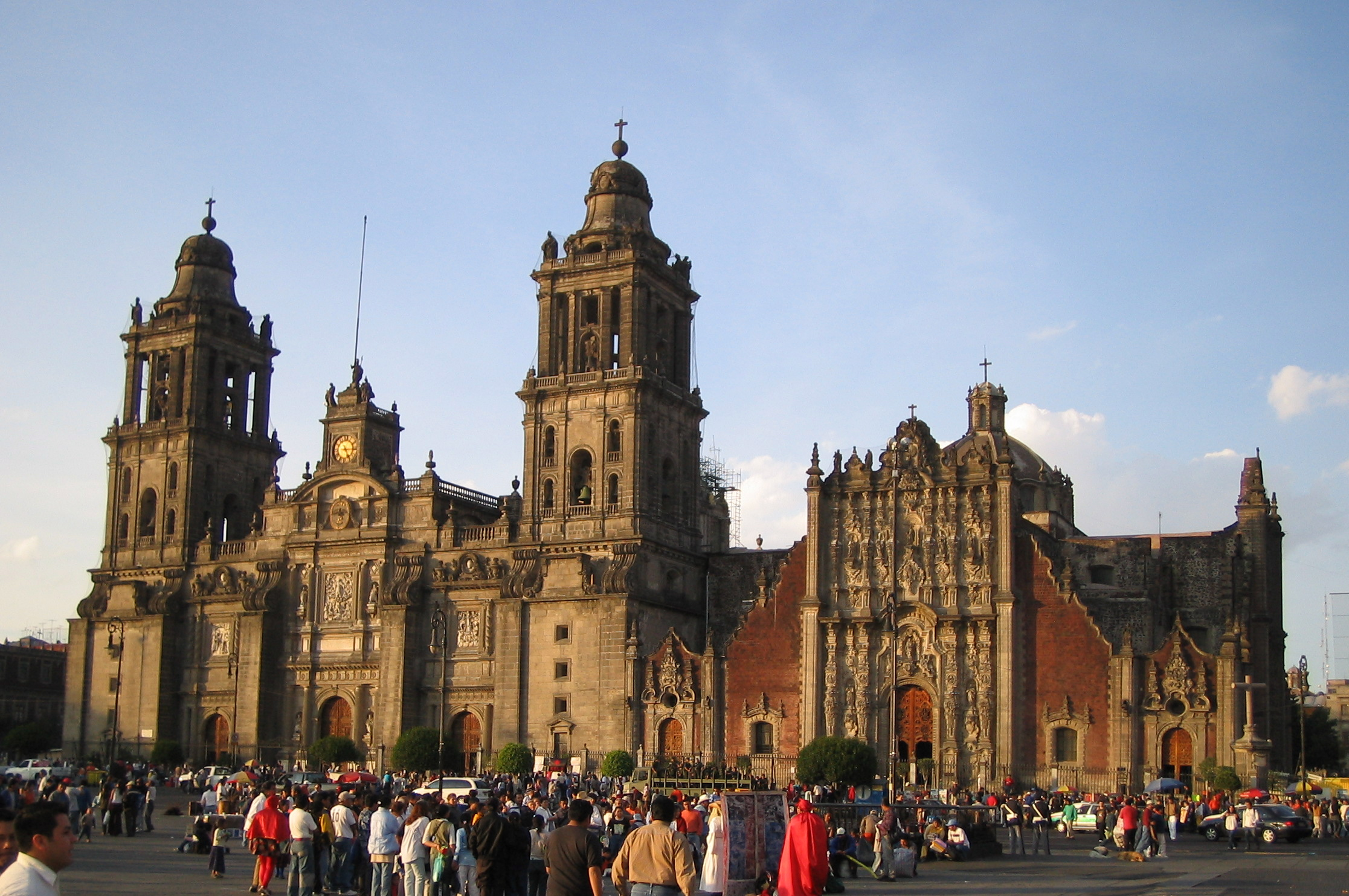
Mexico City Metropolitan Cathedral, Mexico City, built between 1571-1813, by several architects

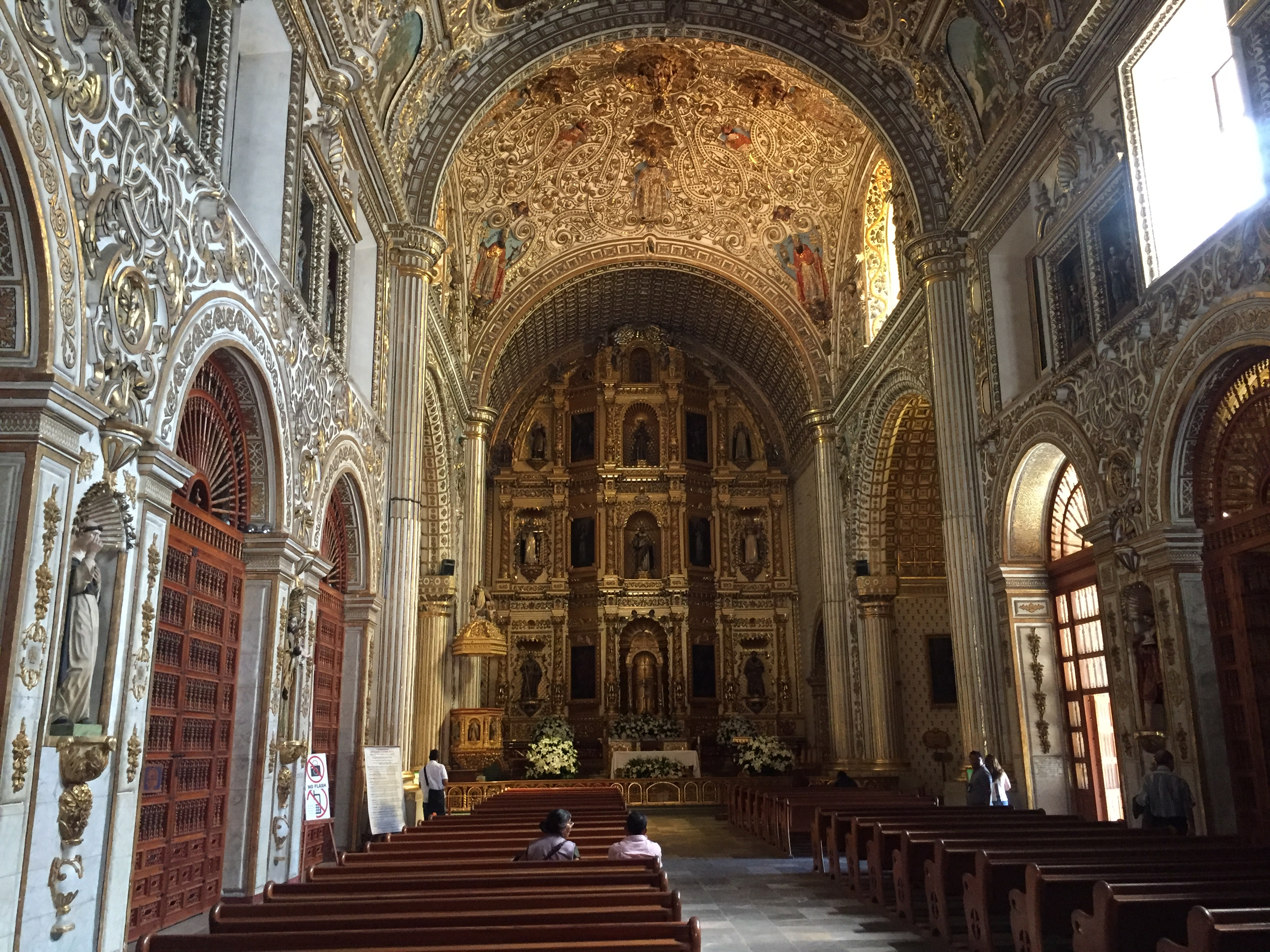
Church of St Domingo de Guzmán, Oaxaca. Mexico. 1572-1724.

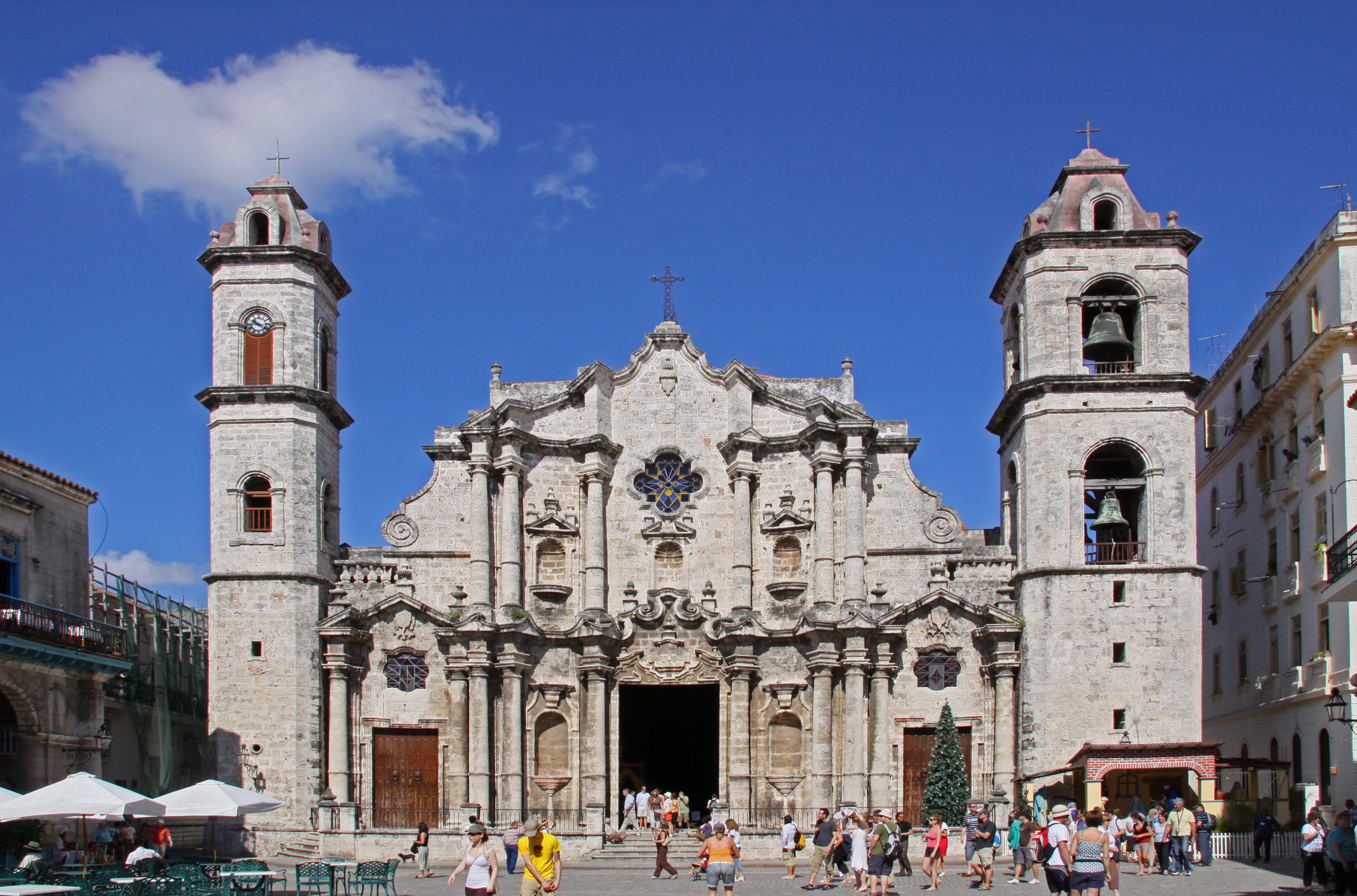
Havana Cathedral, Cuba, built between 1748-1777

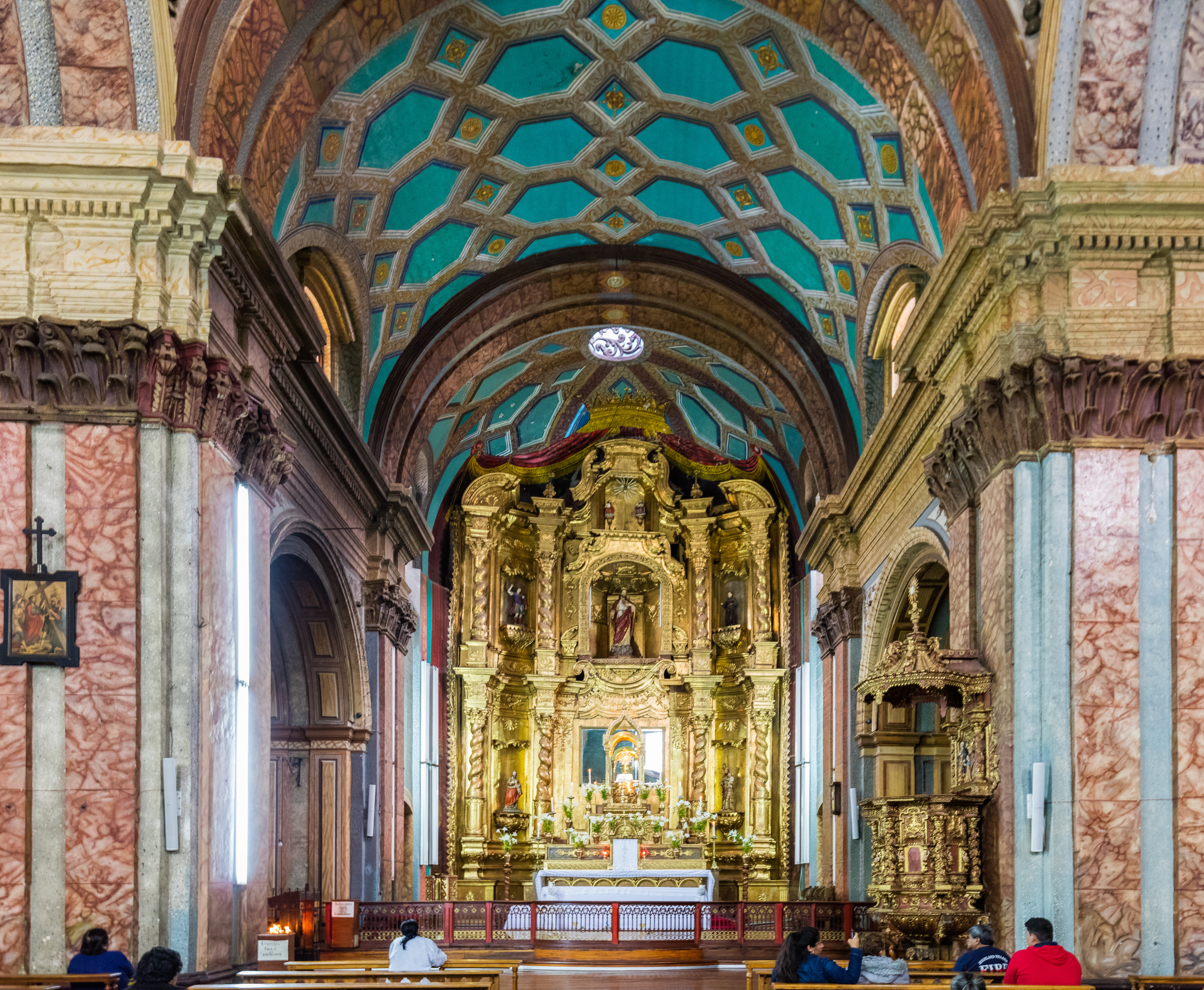
High altar of the Iglesia de El Sagrario, Quito, church built between 1617-1747 by Spaniard José Jaime Ortiz. It is a World Heritage Site by UNESCO

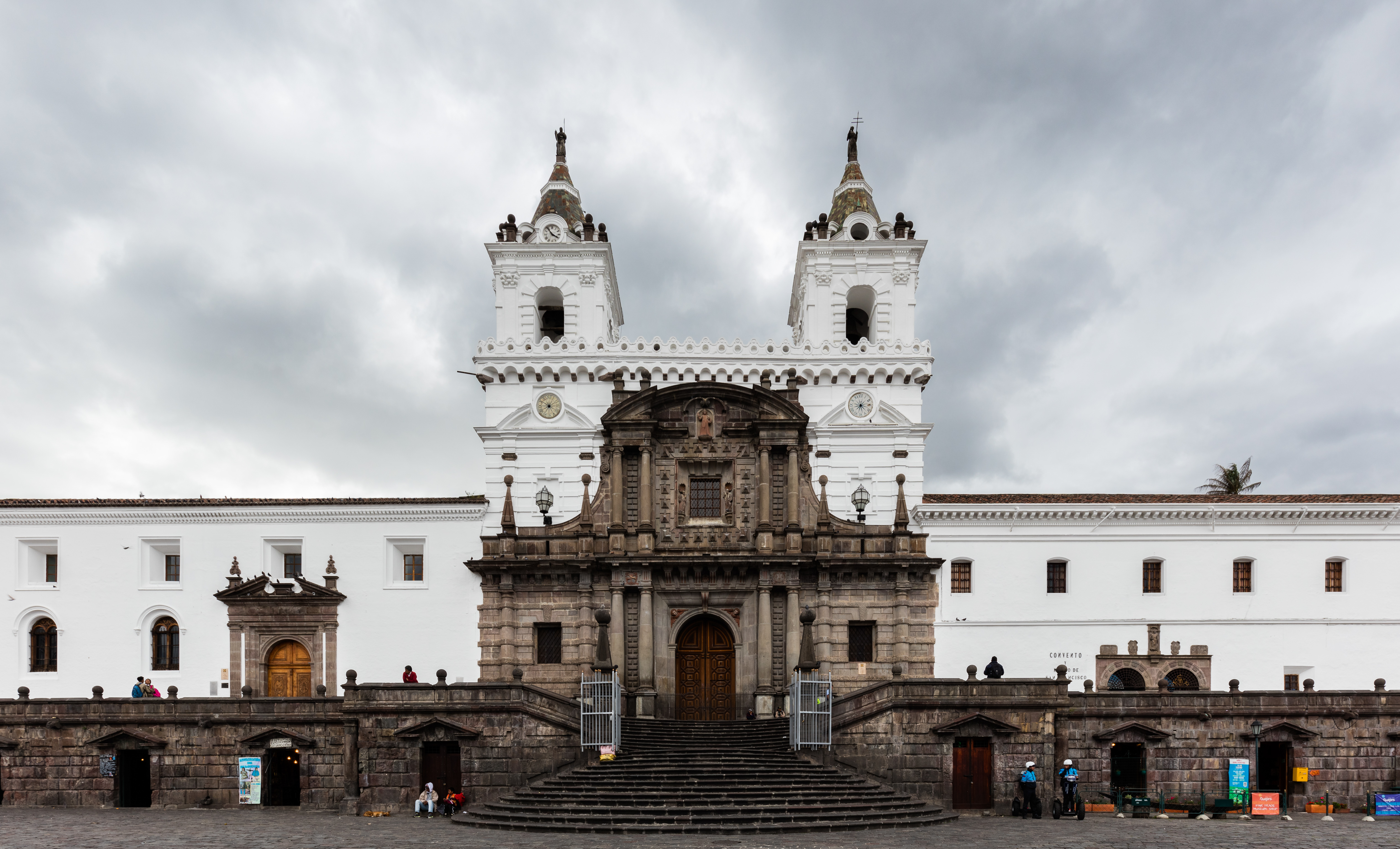
Complete façade of the Iglesia y Convento de San Francisco, Quito, built between 1550-1680

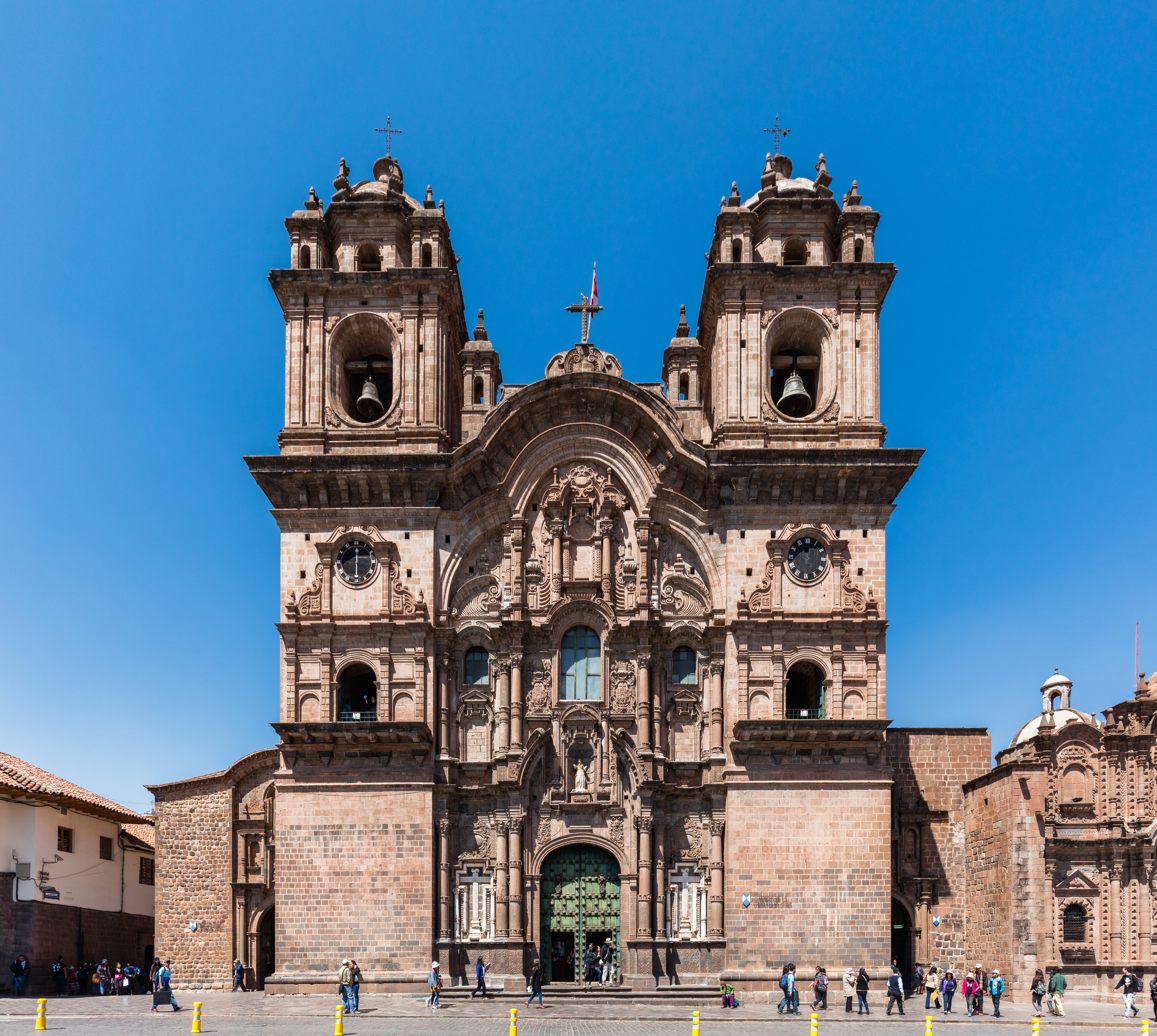
Iglesia de la Compañía de Jesús, Cusco, Peru, built between 1576-1668, by Jean-Baptiste Gilles and Diego Martínez de Oviedo.

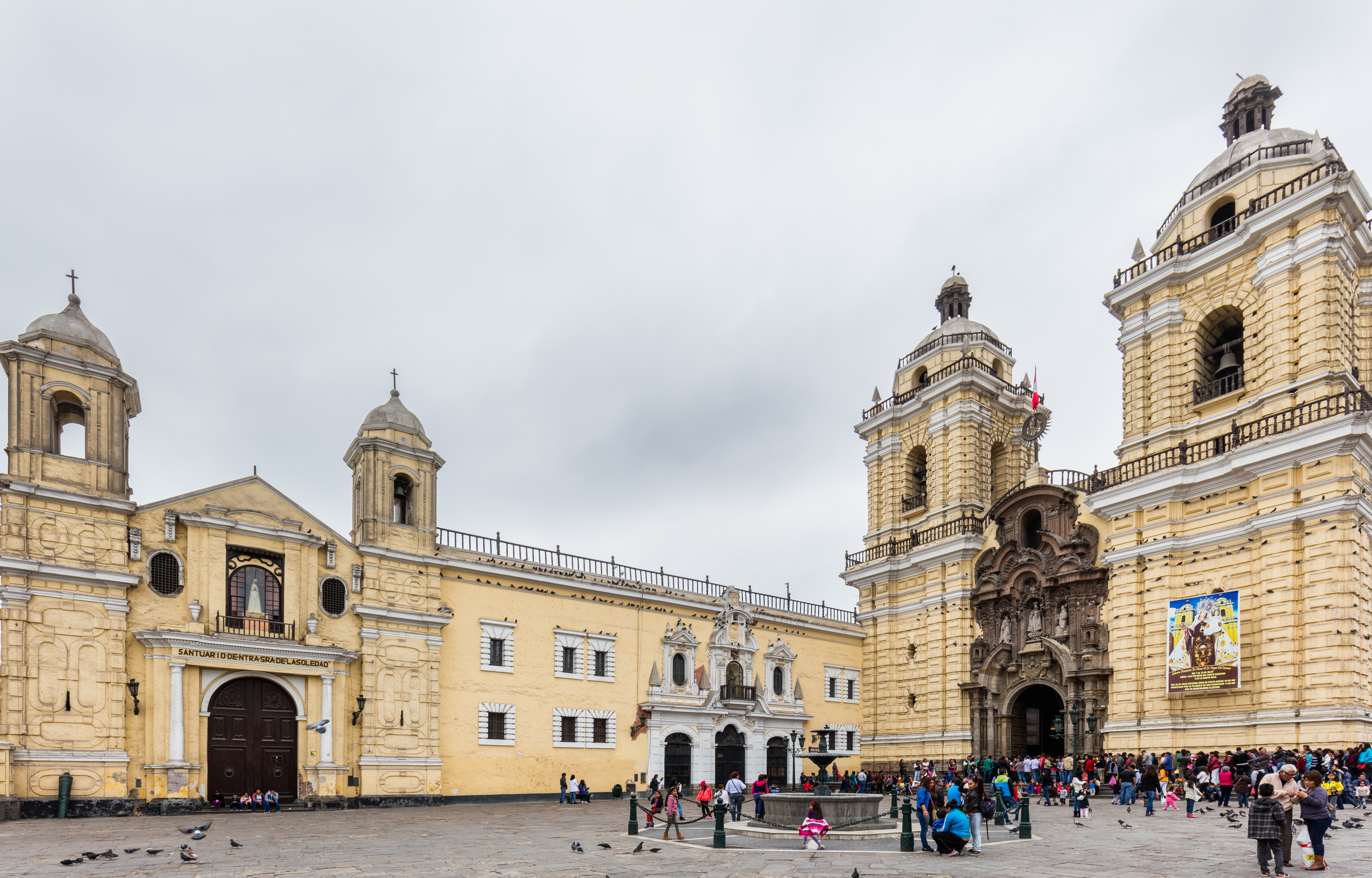
Panorama of the façade of the Basilica and Convent of San Francisco, Lima, built between 1657-1672 by the Portuguese Constantino de Vasconcellos and the Liman Manuel Escobar, is a World Heritage City by UNESCO

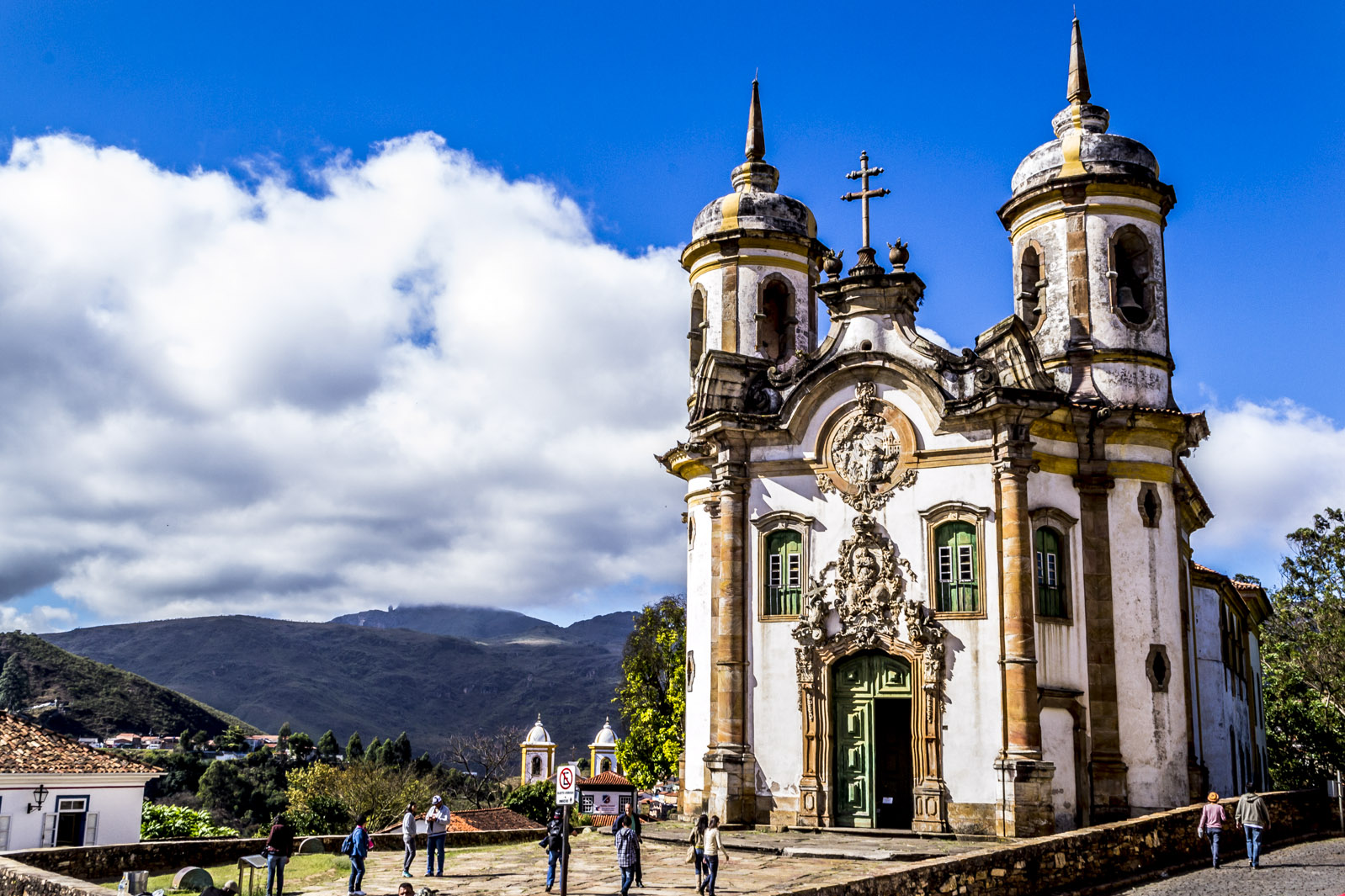
Church of Saint Francis of Assisi (Ouro Preto), Brazil, built between 1765-1775, by Brazilian Aleijadinho

=== Ottoman Baroque ===
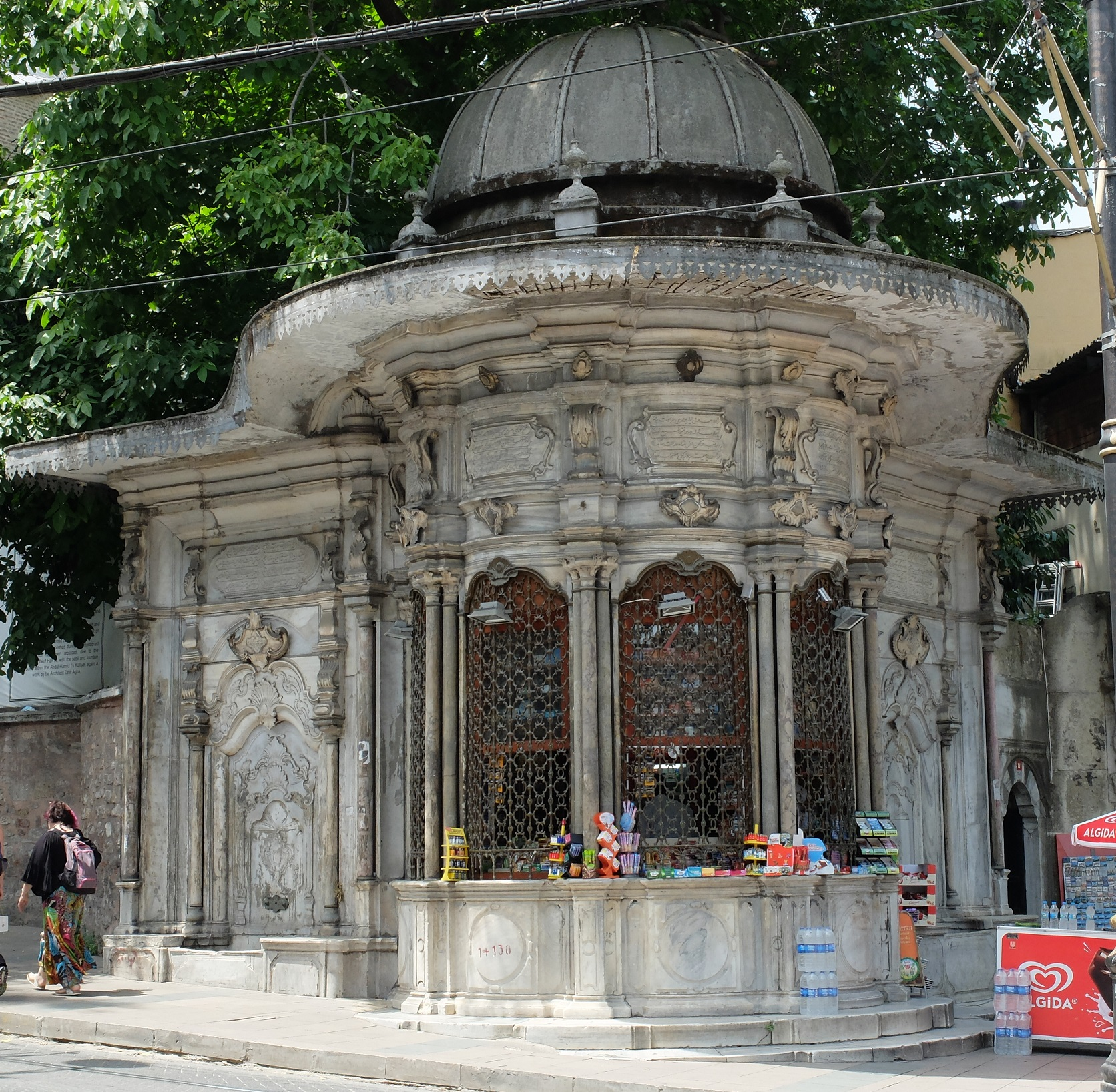
Sebil of Abdülhamid I, Istanbul (circa 1780)

During the 1740s a new Ottoman or Turkish "Baroque" style (Note: Unlike earlier precedents that described the Ottoman Baroque as a merely decorative “formal borrowing” (17) of default stylistic ornaments from the European Baroque (despite the absence of any association with the Catholic Reformation), Rüstem aspires to discuss the Ottoman Baroque within three themes. First, he locates this concept as a “pronounced concern for self-display” linked to early modern quests (13) exhibiting “visual splendor,” “magnificence and power” (16). Second, he argues that the Ottoman Baroque stands for a “series of connected visual traditions” (16) enabling eclectic references to diverse styles. Third, Rüstem explains that this visual tradition devises a “global perspective” enabled through “an international system of communication” among major European urban centers that Ottoman Istanbul was connected to (16–17). According to Rüstem, these premises constitute a broader context for understanding the concept of an Ottoman Baroque than one that is either limited to a European framework or defined in terms of westernization.) emerged in its full expression and rapidly replaced the style of the Tulip Period. This shift signaled the final end to the classical style. Challenging the view that the style was derivative and inauthentic, this chapter explains the Ottoman Baroque as a conscious endeavor to refashion Istanbul into a modern city boasting a globally resonant mode of architecture. Such rebranding was part of a larger move to reaffirm the empire’s status in an age of intensified transregional interaction and dialogue.

The most important monument heralding the new Ottoman Baroque style is the Nuruosmaniye Mosque complex, begun by Mahmud I in October 1748 and completed by his successor, Osman III (to whom it is dedicated), in December 1755. Doğan Kuban describes it as the "most important monumental construction after the Selimiye Mosque in Edirne", marking the integration of European culture into Ottoman architecture and the rejection of the classical Ottoman style. It also marked the first time since the Sultan Ahmed I Mosque (early 17th century) that an Ottoman sultan built his own imperial mosque complex in Istanbul, thus inaugurating the return of this tradition.

The Ayazma Mosque in Üsküdar was built between 1757–58 and 1760–61. It is essentially a smaller version of the Nuruosmaniye Mosque, signaling the importance of the latter as a new model to emulate. Although smaller, it is relatively tall for its proportions, enhancing its sense of height. This trend towards height was pursued in later mosques.

== Characteristics ==
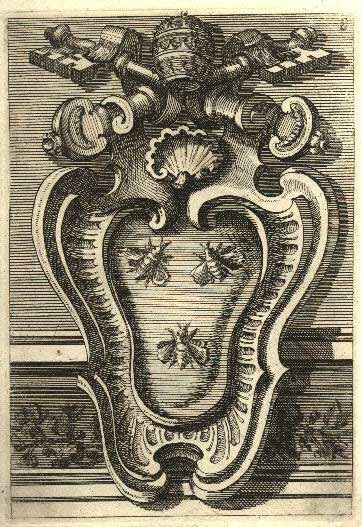
Decorative cartouche designed for the Palazzo Barberini by Filippo Juvarra (1711)

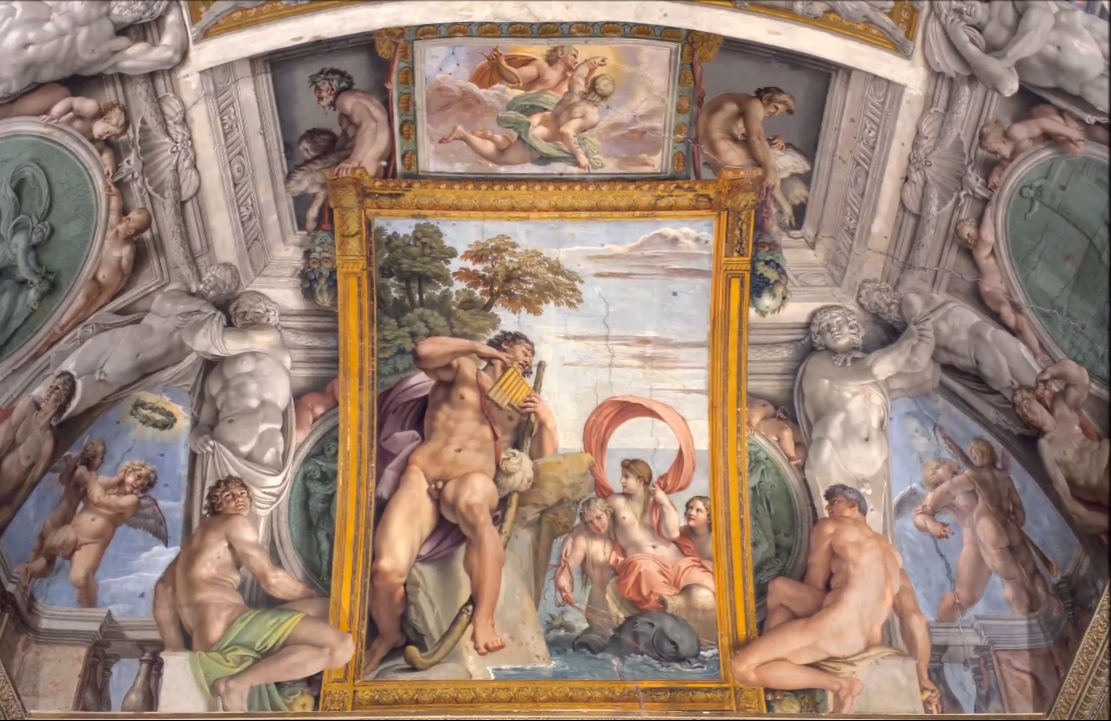
Ceiling of the Farnese Gallery by Annibale Carracci (1597–1704)

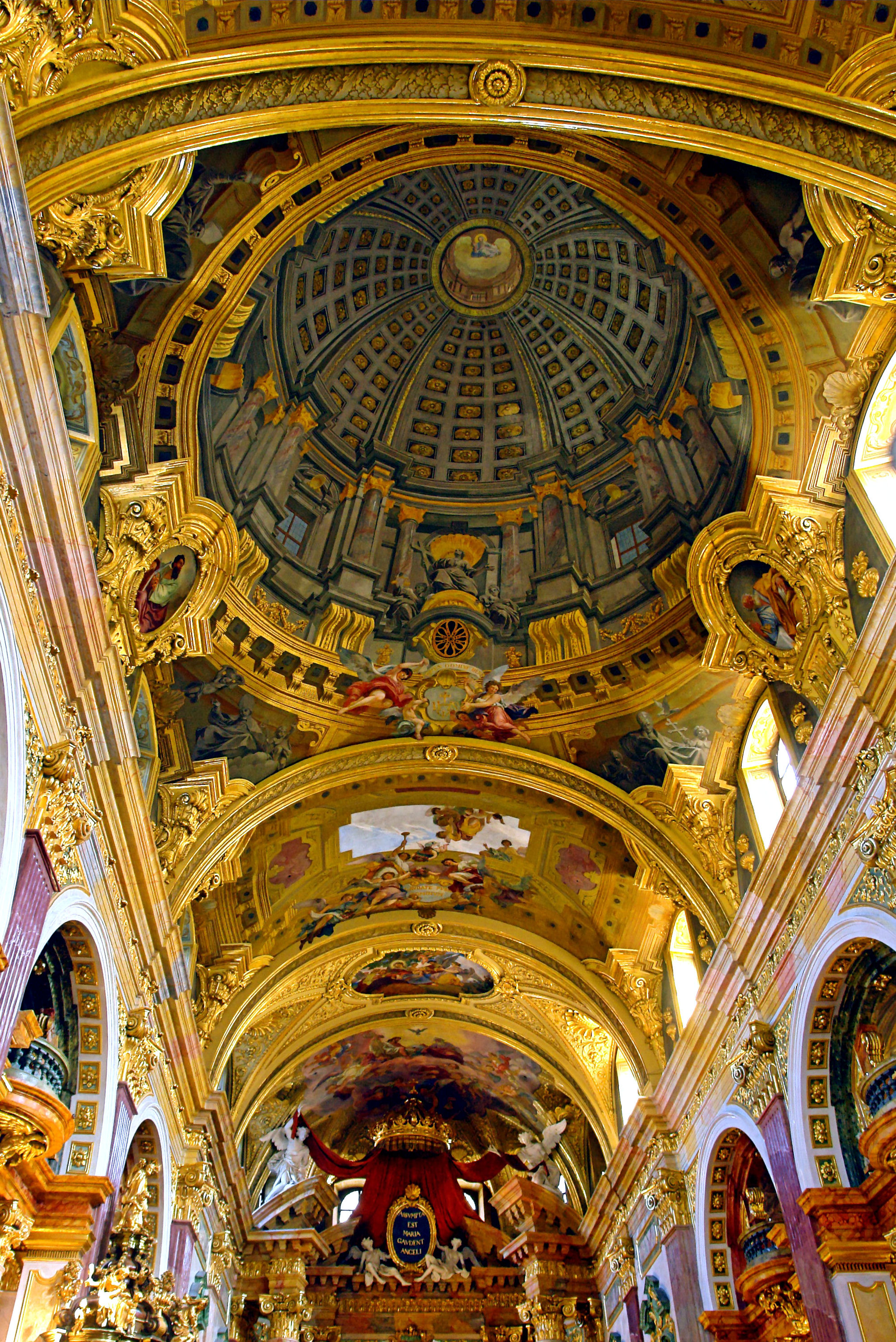
Illusionistic ceiling painting of the Jesuitenkirche, Vienna, by Andrea Pozzo (1703)

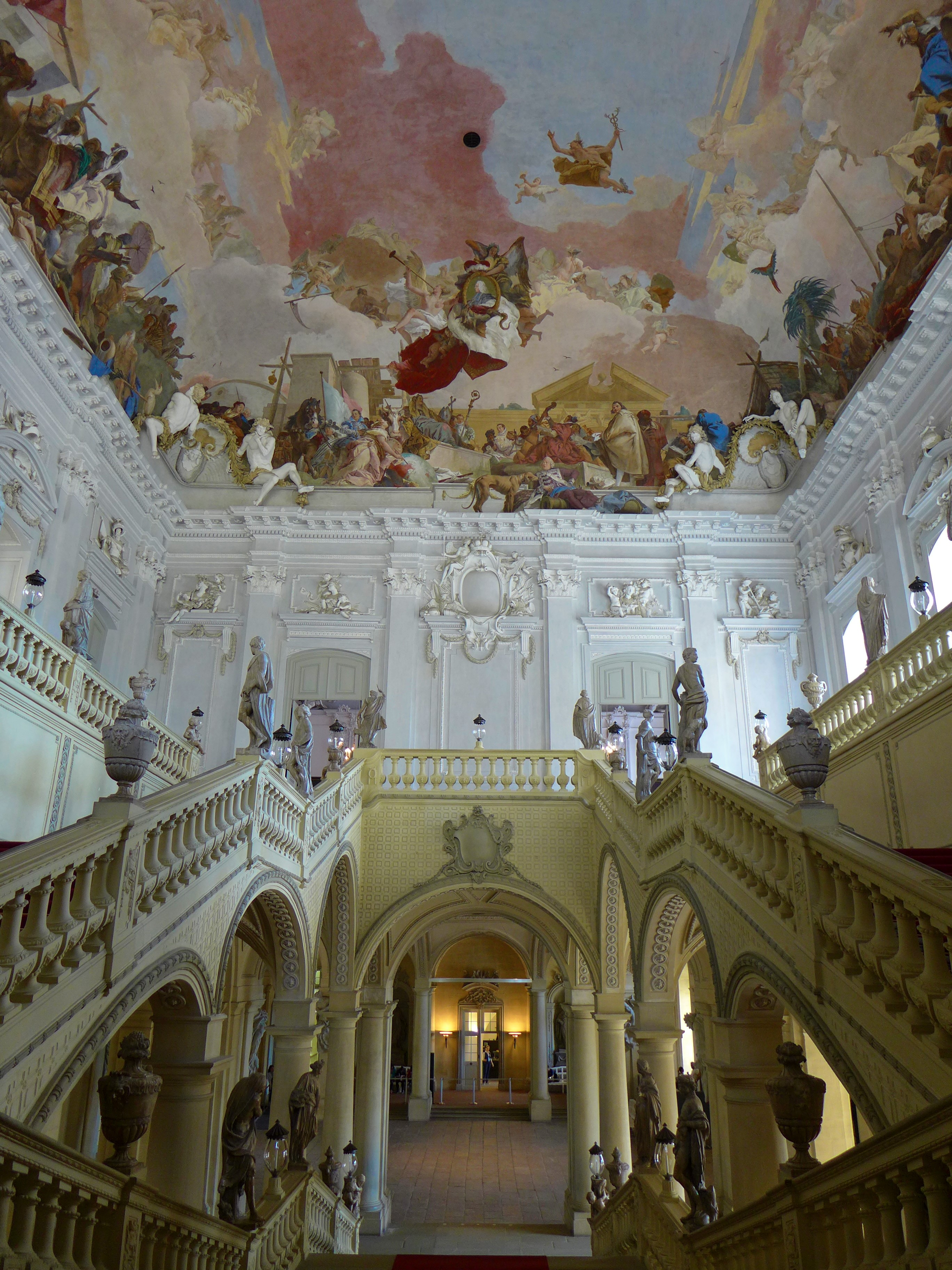
Grand staircase of the Würzburg Residence (1720–1780) by Balthasar Neumann

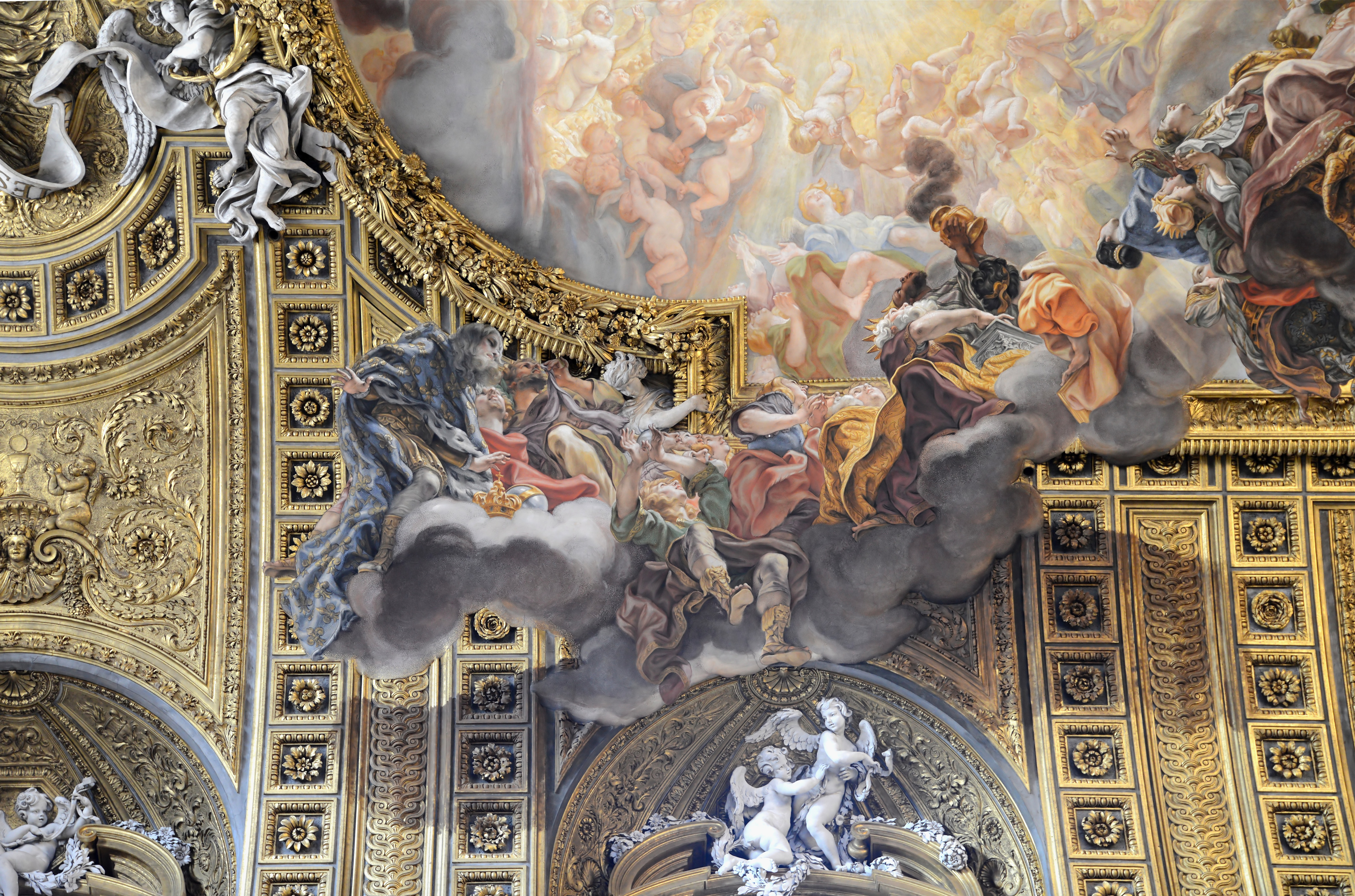
Trompe-l'œil effect on the ceiling of the Church of the Gesù, Rome, by Giovanni Battista Gaulli (completed 1679)

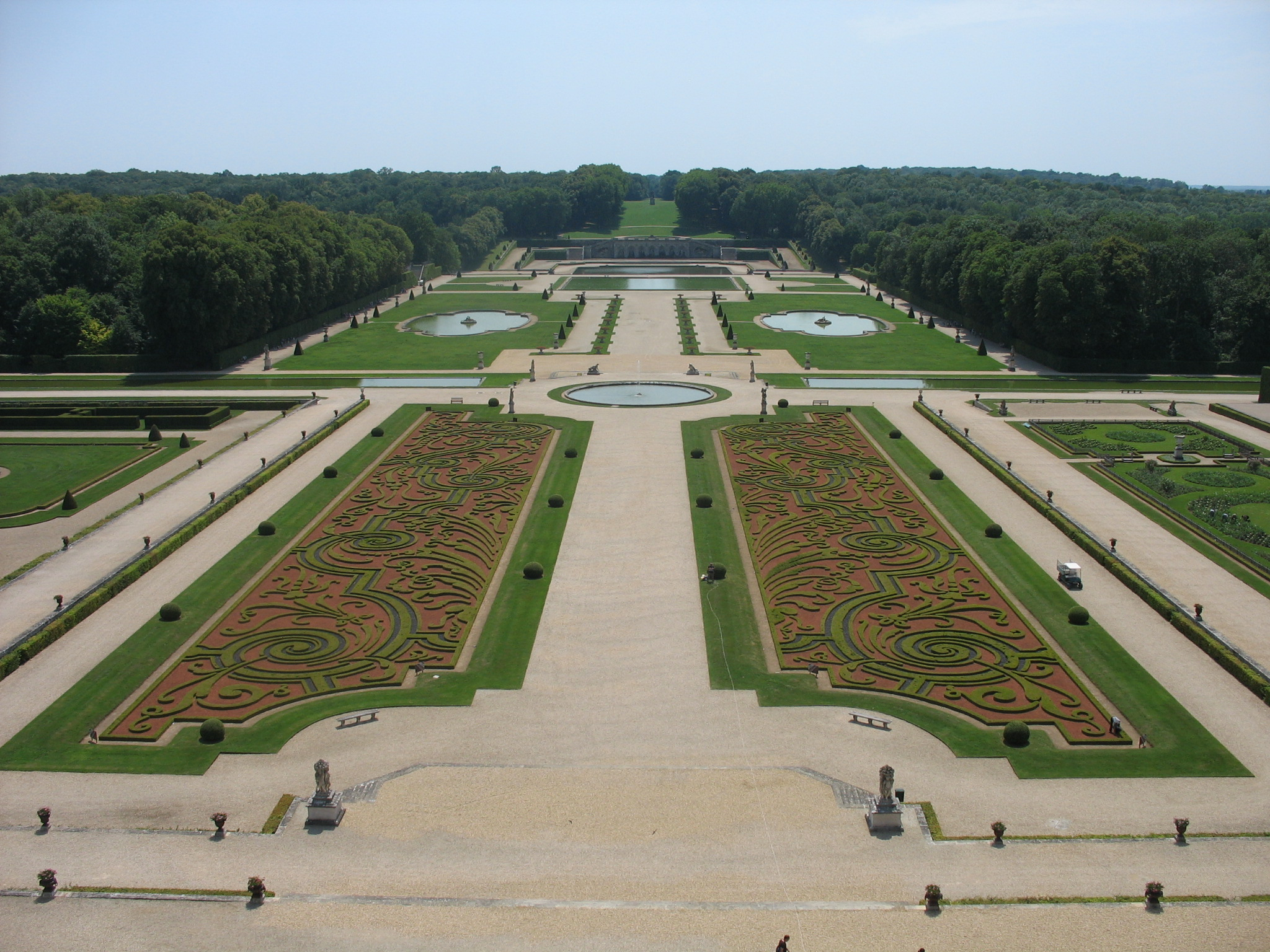
Baroque garden at Vaux-le-Vicomte. The parterre, designed to be viewed from above from the Chateau windows and terrace, was an extension of the interior architecture and design

Baroque architecture often used visual and theatrical effects, designed to amaze and awe the viewer:

- domes were a common feature. Their interiors were often painted with a sky filled with angels and sculpted sunbeams, suggesting glory or a vision of heaven. Pear-shaped domes were sometimes used in the Bavarian, Czech, Polish and Ukrainian Baroque
- quadratura. Paintings in trompe-l'œil of angels and saints in the dome and on the ceiling, combined with stucco frames or decoration, which give the illusion of three dimensions, and of looking through the ceiling to the heavens. Sometimes painted or sculpted figures of Atlantes appear to be holding up the ceiling. In some Baroque churches, illusionistic ceiling painting gave the illusion of three dimensions.
- grand stairways. Stairways often occupied a central place and were used for dramatic effect. winding upwards in stages, giving changing views from different levels, serving as a setting for ceremonies.
- cartouche in elaborate forms and sculpted frames break up the surfaces and add three-dimensional effects to the walls.
- mirrors to give the impression of depth and greater space, particularly when combined with windows, as in the Hall of Mirrors at the Palace of Versailles.
- incomplete architectural elements, such as frontons with sections missing, causing sections to merge and disorienting the eye.
- chiaroscuro. Use of strong contrasts of darkness and light for dramatic effect.
- overhead sculpture. Putti or figures on or just below the ceiling, made of wood (often gilded), plaster or stucco, marble or faux finishing, giving the impression of floating in the air.
- Solomonic columns, which gave an illusion of motion.
- elliptical or oval spaces, eliminating right angles. Sometimes an oval nave was surrounded by radiating circular chapels. This was a distinctive feature of the Basilica of the Fourteen Holy Helpers of Balthasar Neumann.

== Plans ==
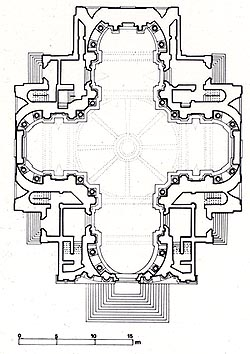
Cruciform plan of a high Baroque Church, Santi Luca e Martina in Rome by Pietro da Cortona (1639–1669)

Floor plan of Sant'Andrea al Quirinale by Gian Lorenzo Bernini (1658–1661) showing the entrance (below), altar (top) and radiating chapels

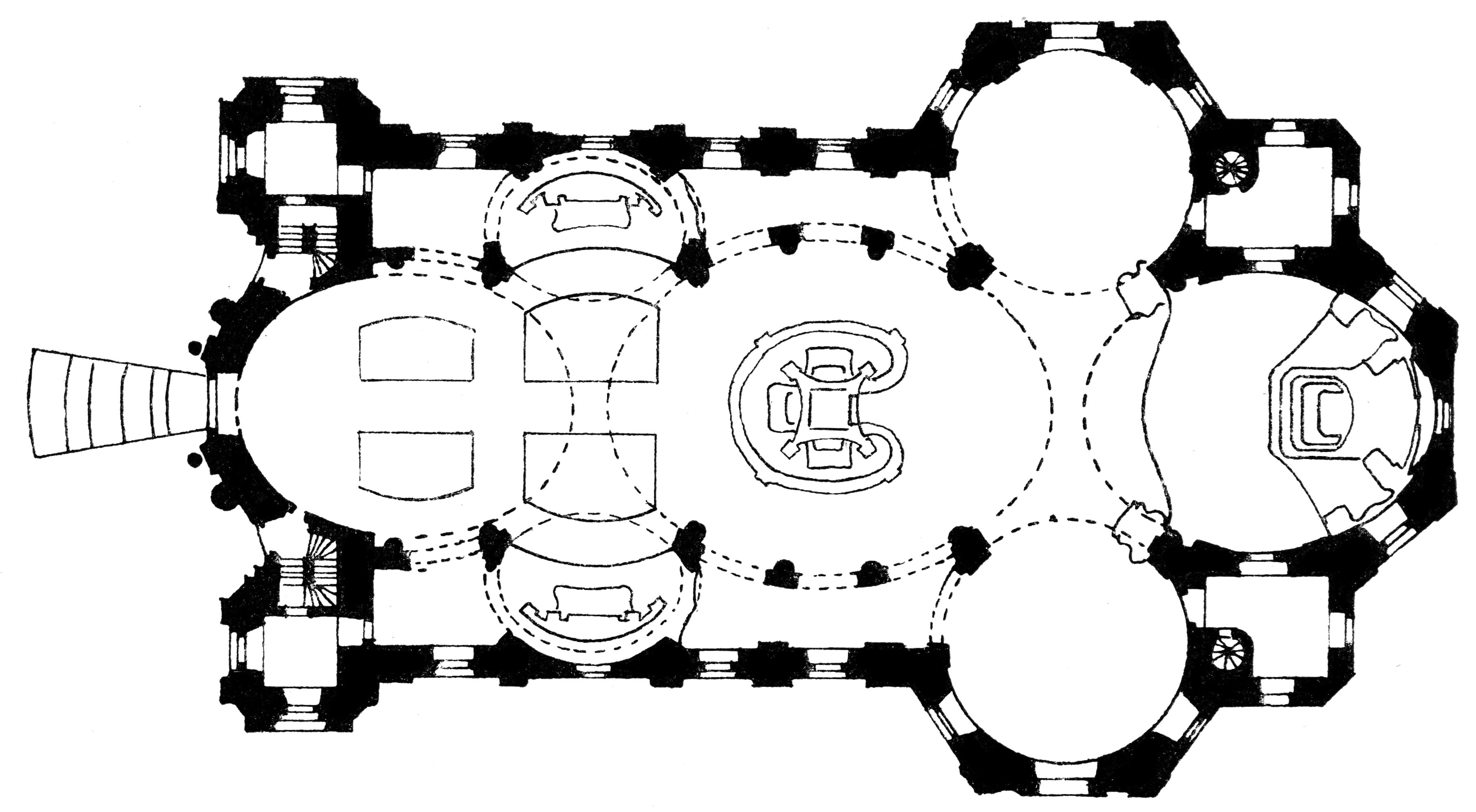
Plan of the Late Baroque Basilica of the Fourteen Holy Helpers by Balthasar Neumann, constructed between 1743 and 1772. The altar is in an oval in the center.

== Major Baroque architects and works, by country ==
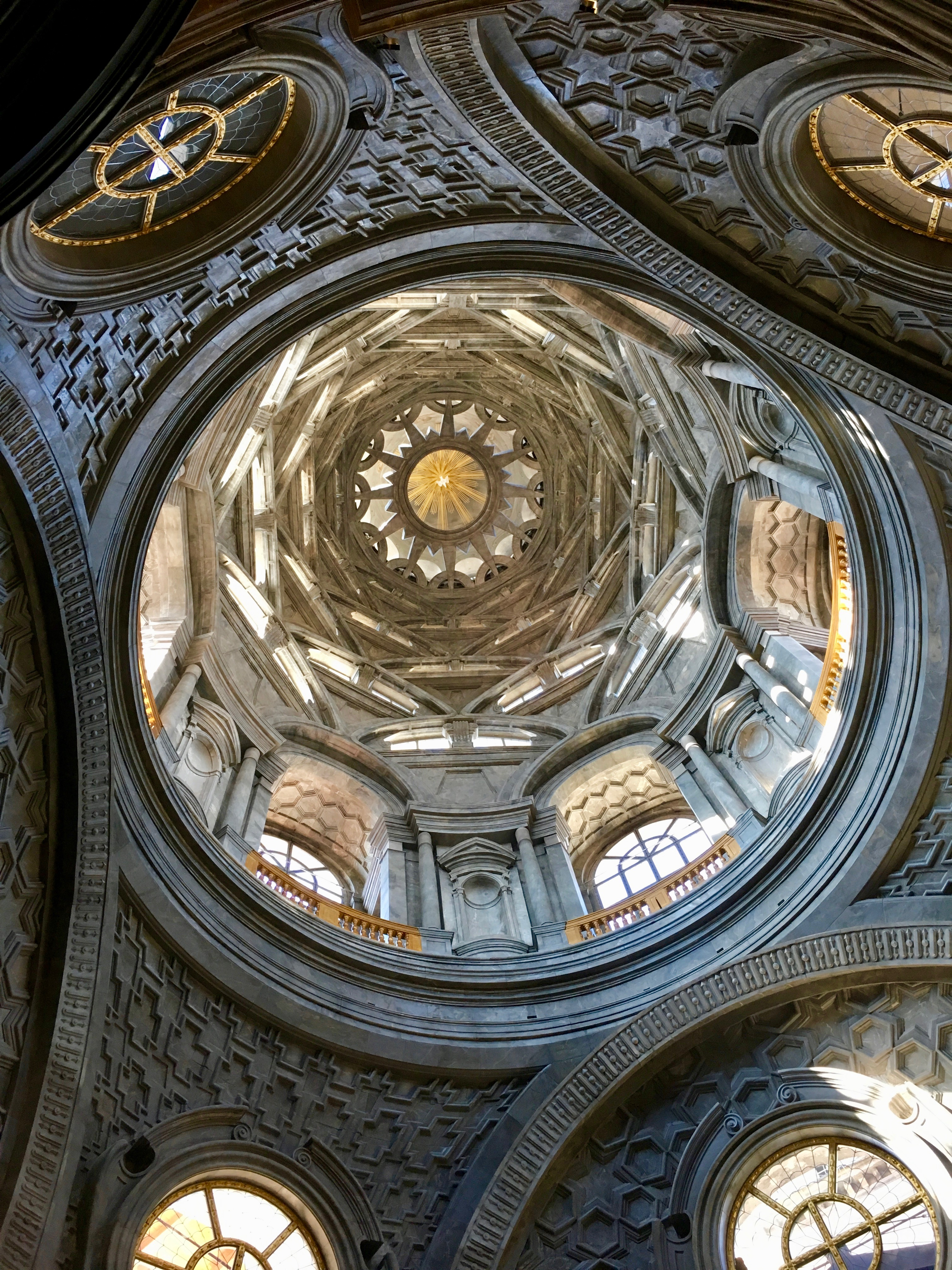
Chapel of the Holy Shroud, Turin

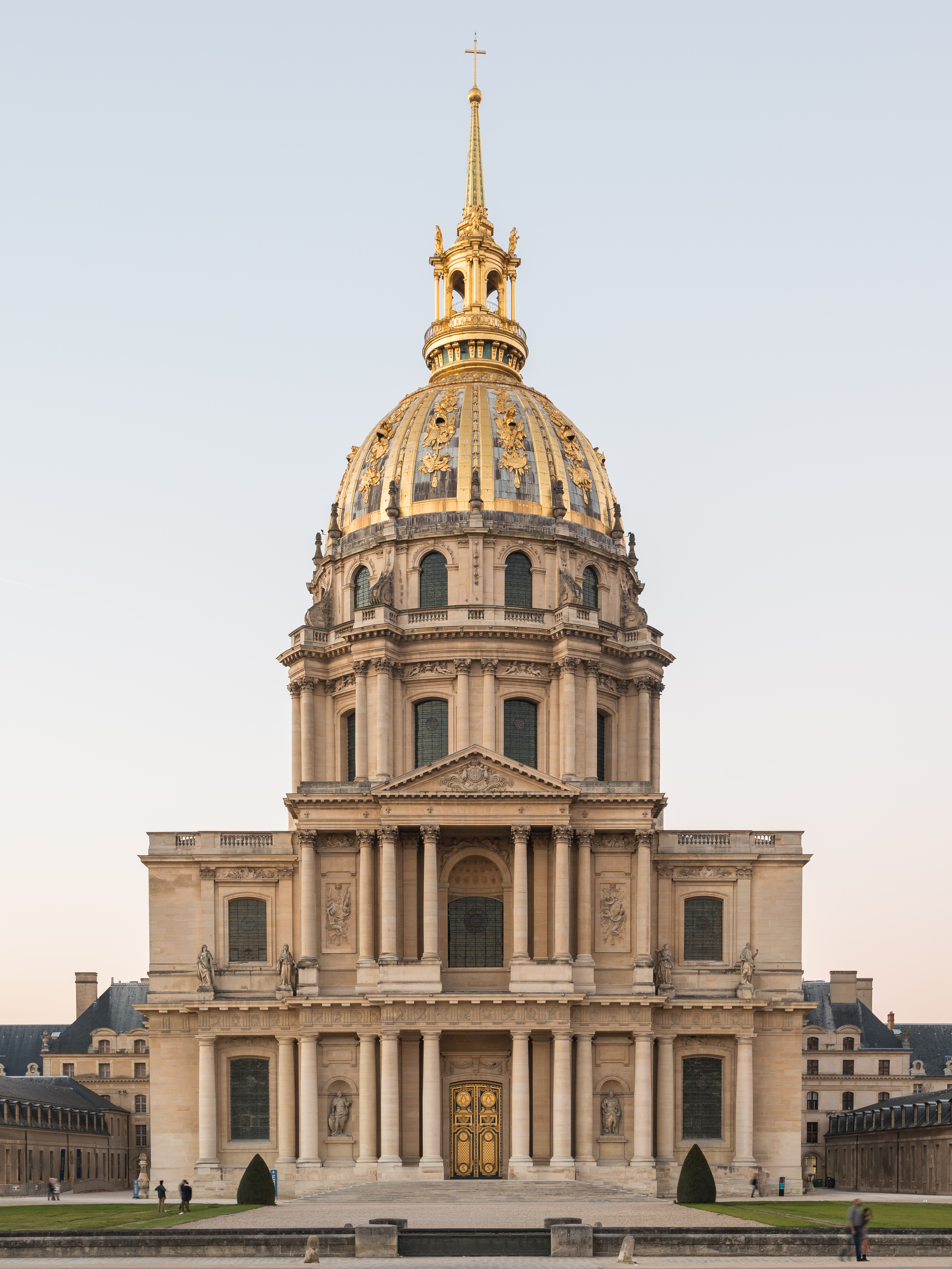
The dome of Les Invalides, Paris

=== Italy ===
- Carlo Maderno – Santa Susanna (1595–603); St. Peter's Basilica and Sant'Andrea della Valle, Rome
- Pietro da Cortona – Santa Maria della Pace (1656–68), Santi Luca e Martina, Rome
- Gian Lorenzo Bernini – Saint Peter's Square, Palazzo Barberini, Sant'Andrea al Quirinale, Rome
- Francesco Borromini – San Carlo alle Quattro Fontane, Sant'Ivo alla Sapienza, Rome
- Carlo Fontana – San Marcello al Corso (1692–1697)
- Francesco de Sanctis – Spanish Steps (1723)
- Luigi Vanvitelli – Caserta Palace (begun 1752)
- Guarino Guarini – Palazzo Carignano in Turin (1679), Chapel of the Holy Shroud, Turin
- Filippo Juvarra – Basilica of Superga, Turin (1717–31)

=== France ===
- Salomon de Brosse – Luxembourg Palace (1615–1645)
- Louis Le Vau – (Vaux-le-Vicomte) (1658–1661), Collège des Quatre-Nations (1662–1688), Cour Carrée of the Louvre Palace (1668–1680)
- Jules Hardouin-Mansart – domed chapel of Les Invalides (finished 1708); garden façade and Hall of Mirrors of Palace of Versailles
- Robert de Cotte – Chapel of Palace of Versailles (1643–1715), Grand Trianon (1643–1715)

=== England ===
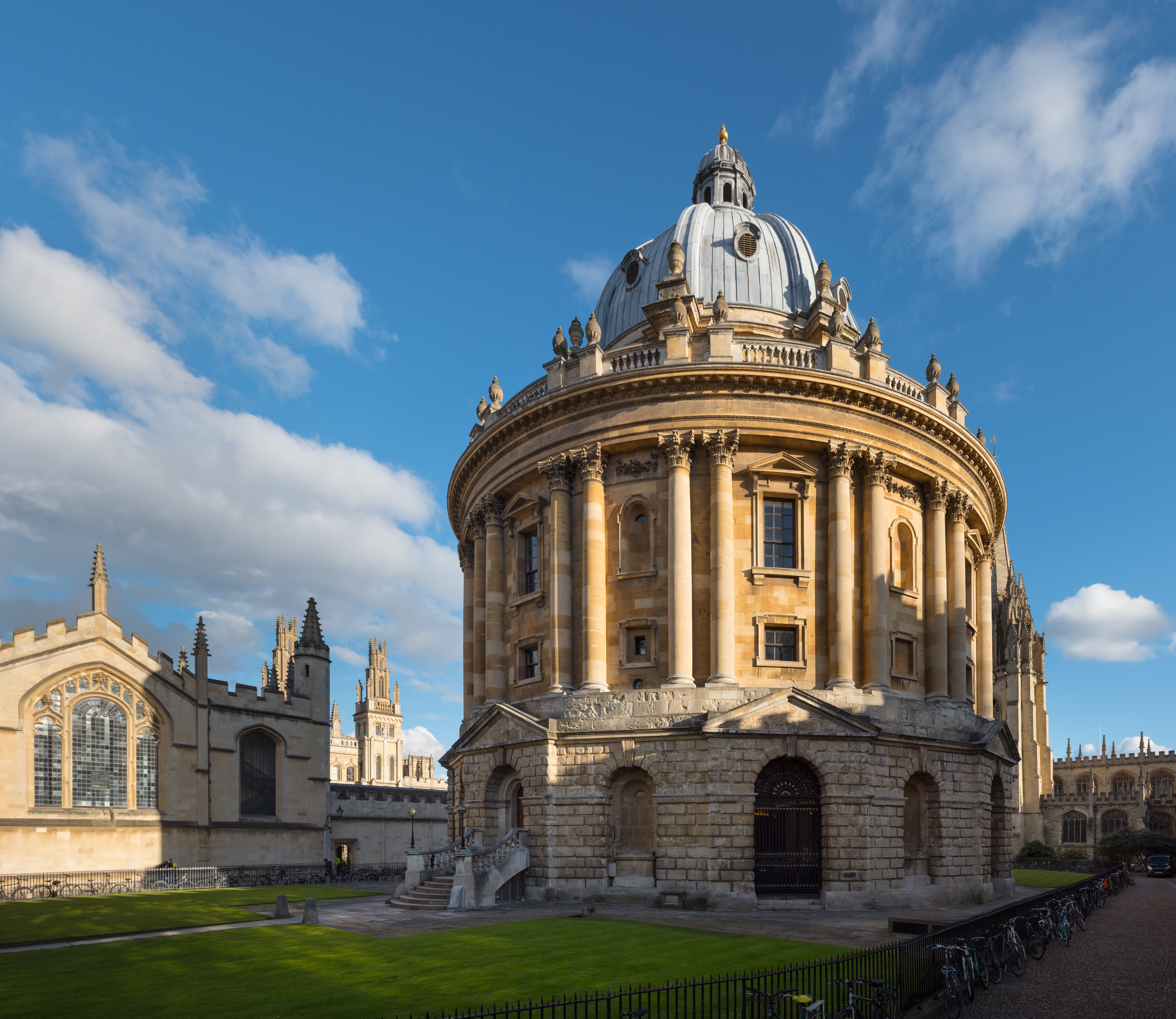
Radcliffe Camera in Oxford

- Christopher Wren – St. Paul's Cathedral (1675–1711), Hampton Court Palace (1690–1696), Greenwich Hospital (begun 1695)
- Nicholas Hawksmoor and John Vanbrugh – Castle Howard (1699–1712); Blenheim Palace (1705–1724)
- James Gibbs – Radcliffe Camera, Oxford (1739–49)

=== The Netherlands ===
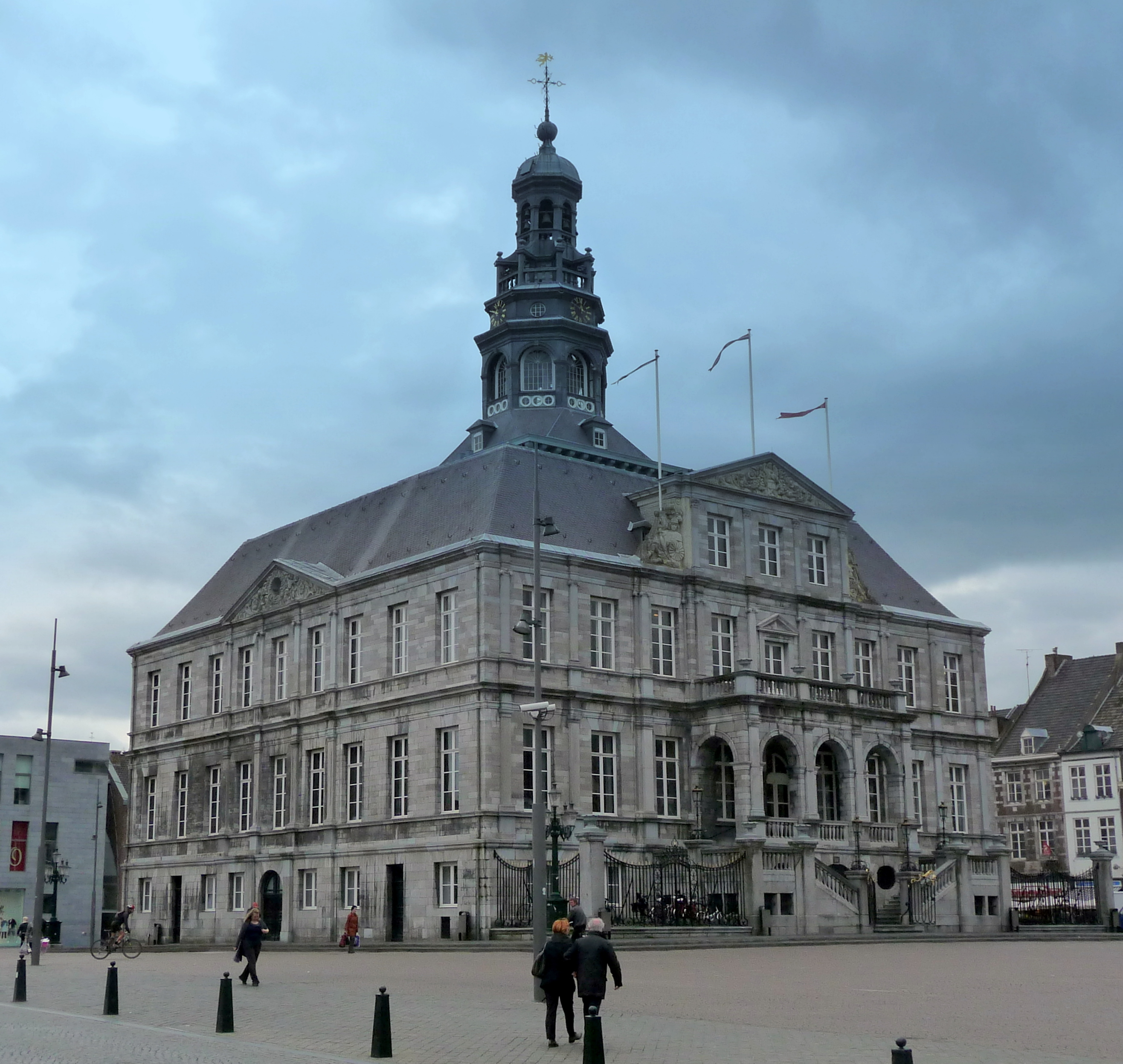
Maastricht City Hall by Pieter Post (1664)

- Jacob Van Campen – Royal Palace of Amsterdam (then city hall) (begun 1648), Noordeinde Palace (1640) and Mauritshuis (1641)
- Lieven de Key – City Hall (Haarlem) (1620)
- Pieter Post – Huis ten Bosch (1645–1652) and Maastricht City Hall (1686)
- Maurits Post – Soestdijk Palace (1650)
- Daniël Stalpaert – Het Scheepvaartmuseum (1655–1656) and Trompenburgh (1684)
- Daniel Marot – Het Loo Palace (1684–1686)
- Bartholomeus van Bassen – Nieuwe Kerk (The Hague) (1656)
- Pierre Cuypers – Oudenbosch Basilica (1892)

=== Germany ===
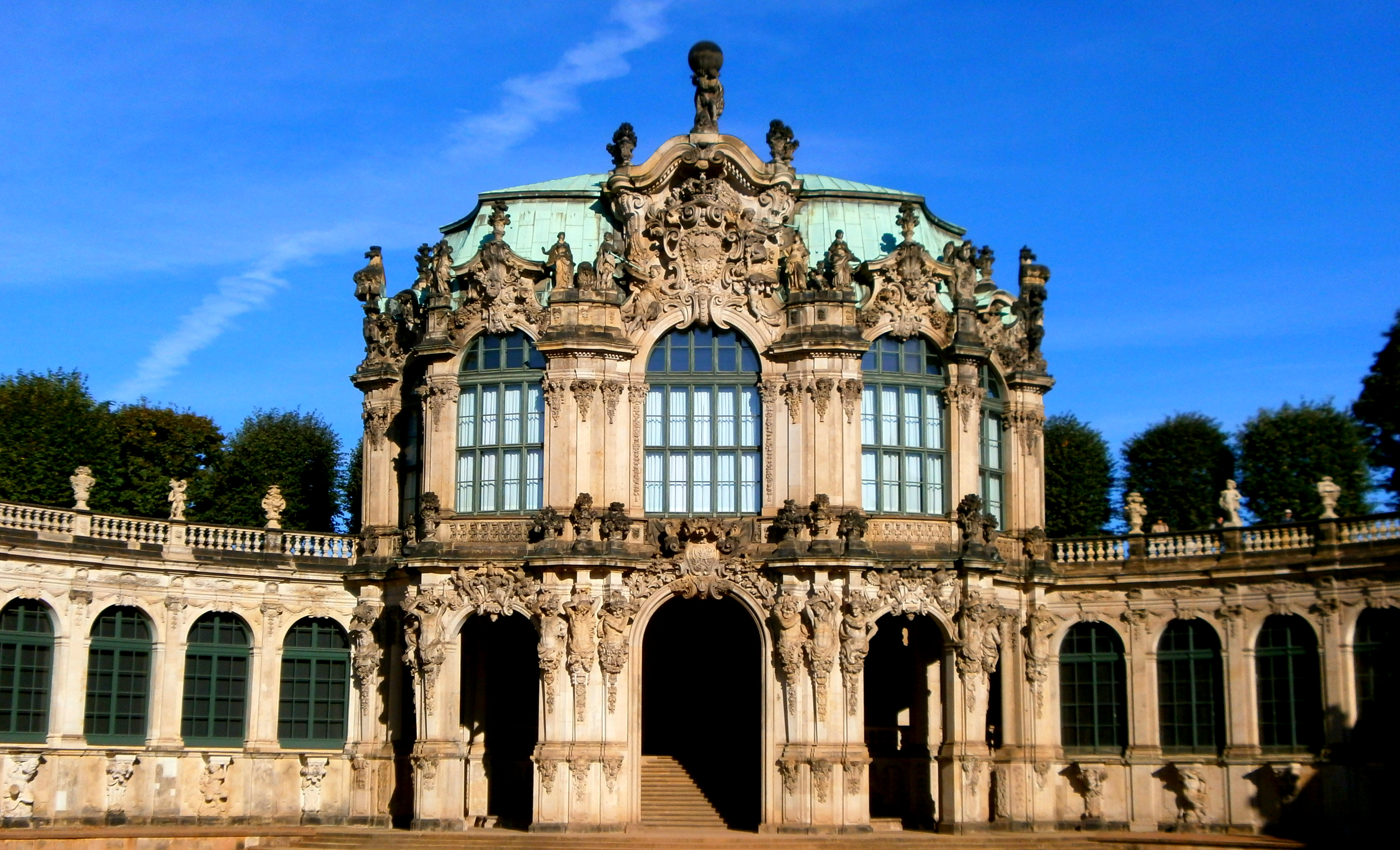
The Zwinger in Dresden by Matthäus Daniel Pöppelmann (1697–1716), reconstructed in the 1950s and 1960s, after the damage of World War II.

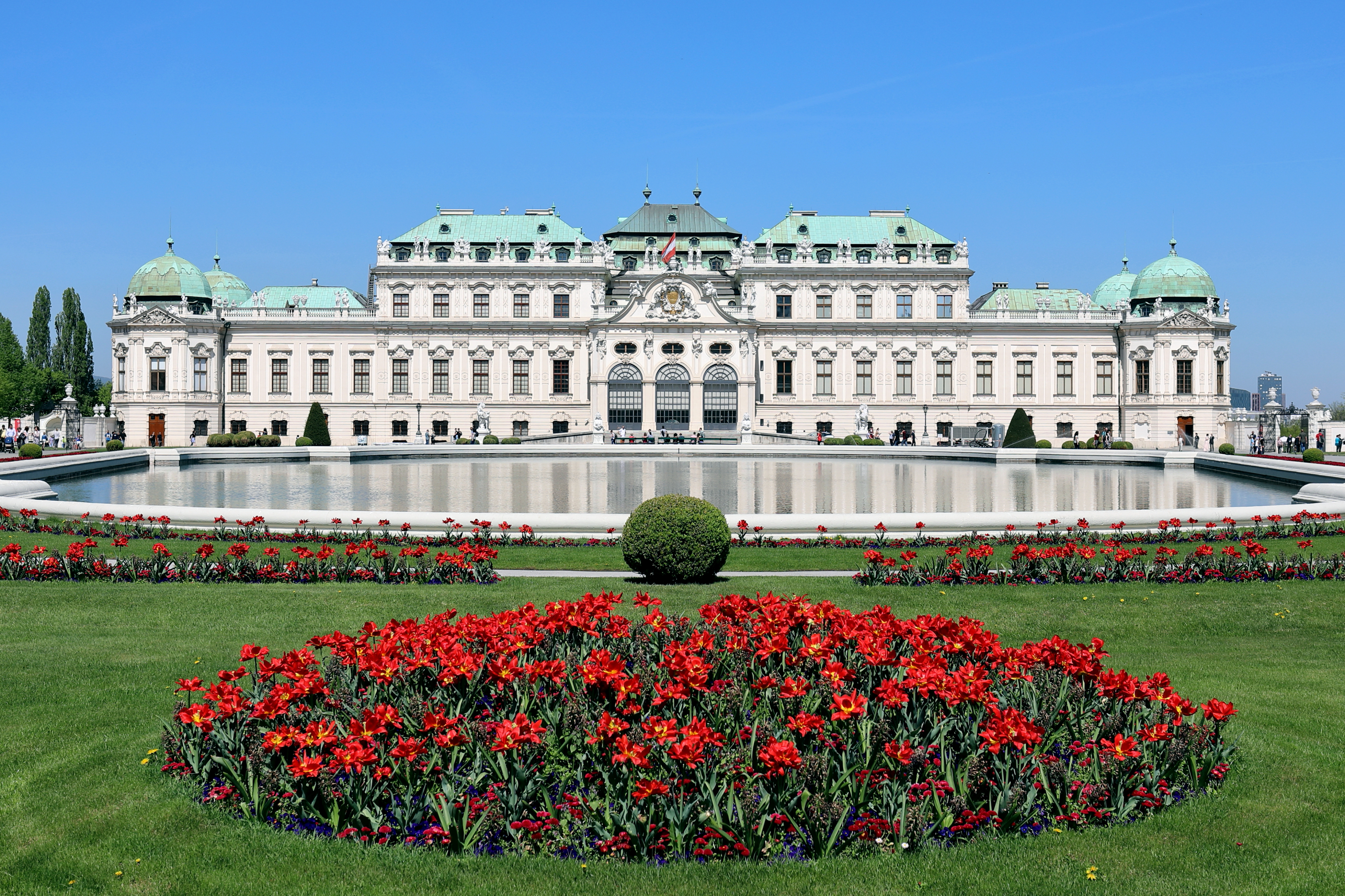
Upper Belvedere Palace in Vienna (1721–23)

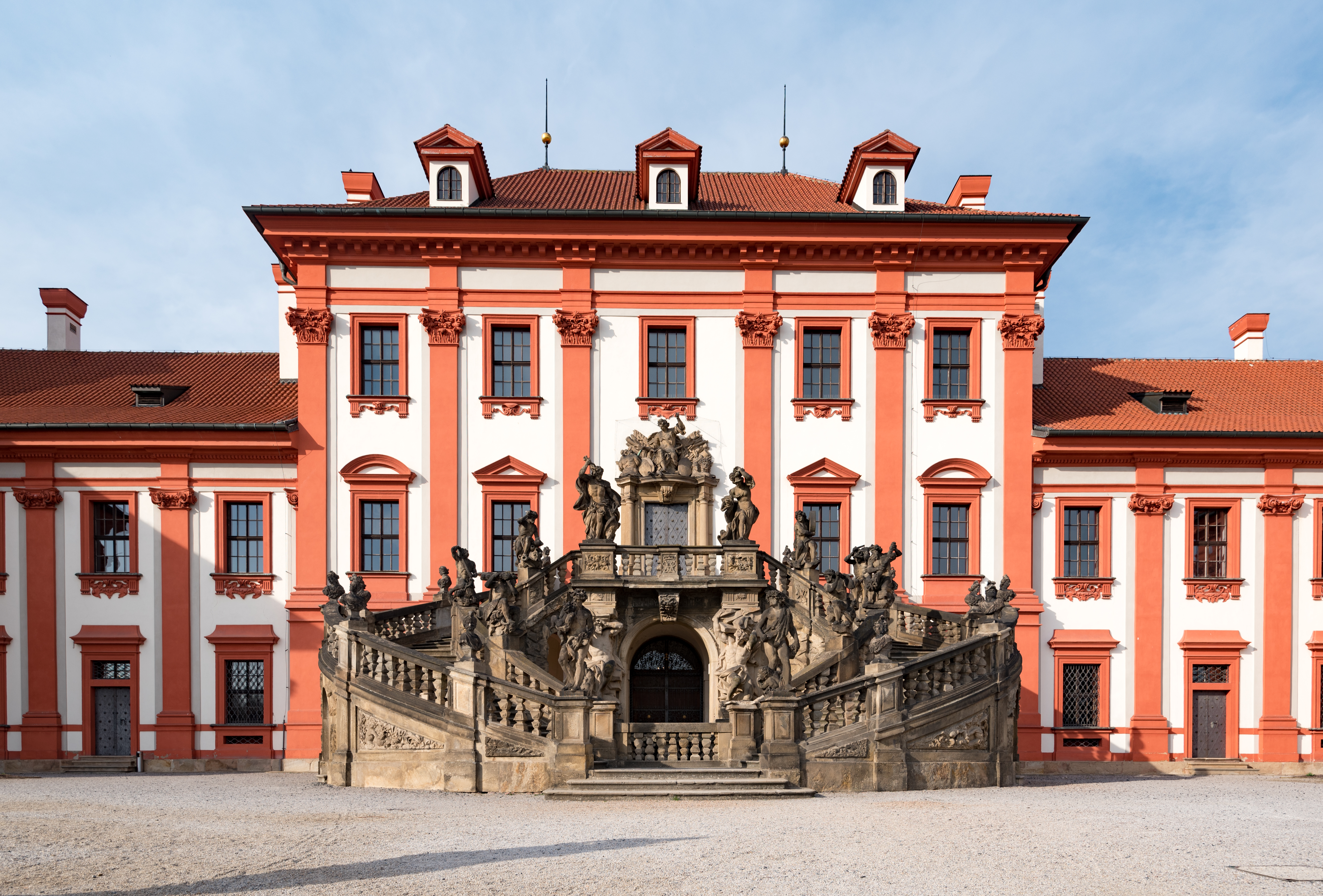
Troja Palace, Prague (1679–1691)

- Agostino Barelli – Nymphenburg Palace, Munich (1664–1675)
- Matthäus Daniel Pöppelmann – Zwinger, Dresden (1697–1716)
- George Bähr – Dresden Frauenkirche (1722–1738, destroyed in 1944, rebuilt in 1994–2005)
- Johann Arnold Nering – Charlottenburg Palace, Berlin (1695–1713)
- Andreas Schlüter, Berlin Palace (1798-1713), reconstructed 2013-2020
- Balthasar Neumann – Basilica of the Fourteen Holy Helpers (1743–1772), Würzburg Residence (1735)
- Johann Dientzenhofer and Johann Lukas von Hildebrandt – Schloss Weißenstein in Pommersfelden, Bavaria (1711–1718)
- Augustusburg Palace

=== Austria ===
- Johann Lukas von Hildebrandt, Upper Belvedere Palace in Vienna (1721–23)
- Johann Bernhard Fischer von Erlach – University Church, Salzburg (begun 1696); Karlskirche, Vienna (1716–37); Austrian National Library (begun 1722)
- Johann Bernhard Fischer von Erlach and Johann Lukas von Hildebrandt – Palais Auersperg in Vienna
- Jakob Prandtauer and Josef Munggenast, Abbey of Melk (1702–1738)
- Santino Solari, Salzburg Cathedral (façade and interior of dome) (1614–1628)

=== Czech Republic ===
- Jean-Baptiste Mathey – Troja Palace, Prague (1679–1691)
- Christoph Dientzenhofer – Břevnov Monastery, Prague (1708–1721) – Church of St Nicholas. Prague (1704–55)
- Kilian Ignaz Dientzenhofer – Kinský Palace (Prague) (1755–1765)

=== Slovakia ===
- Pietro Spozzo – Jesuit Church of Trnava (1629–37)

=== Hungary ===
- András Mayerhoffer – Gödöllő Palace near Budapest (begun 1733)
- Ignác Oraschek and Márton Wittwer: Esterházy Palace in Fertőd

=== Romania ===
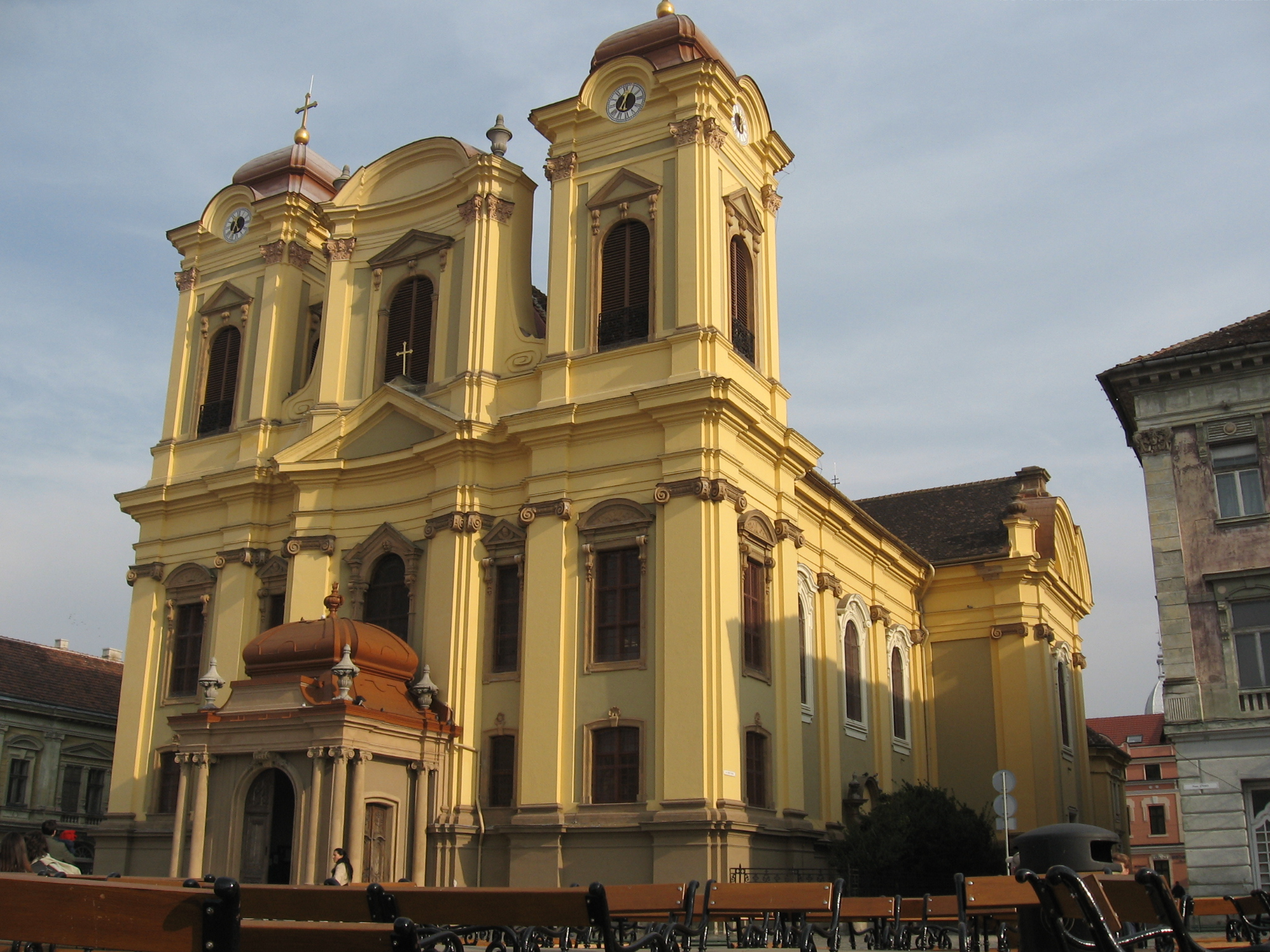
St. George's Cathedral, Timișoara by Joseph Emanuel Fischer von Erlach

- Johann Eberhard Blaumann – Bánffy Palace in Cluj (1774–75)
- Johann Lukas von Hildebrandt – Bishopric Palace in Oradea (1736–1750)
- Joseph Emanuel Fischer von Erlach – St. George's Cathedral, Timișoara
- Anton Erhard Martinelli – Holy Trinity Cathedral, Blaj (1738–1749)
- Samuel von Brukenthal – Brukenthal Palace in Sibiu (1777–87)
- Franz Burger – Brukenthal High School in Sibiu (1779–81)
- Jesuit Church, Sibiu (1726–33)
- Gheorghe Lazăr National College (Sibiu)

=== Poland ===
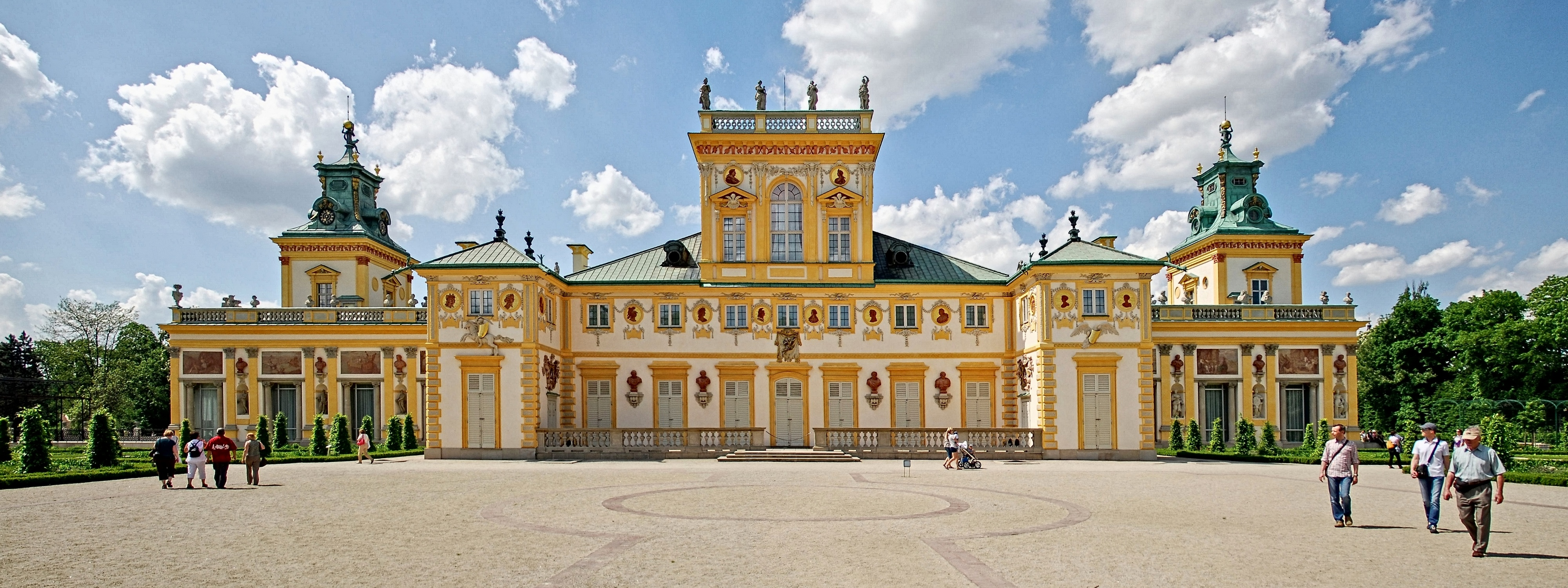
Wilanów Palace, Warsaw (1677–1696)

- Giovanni Maria Bernardoni – Saints Peter and Paul Church, Kraków (1597–1619)
- Joseph Emanuel Fischer von Erlach – Chapel of the Holy Sacrament, Wroclaw Cathedral
- Karl Friedrich Pöppelmann – Blue Palace in Warsaw (1728)
- Tylman van Gameren – Krasinski Palace, Warsaw (1677–1682)
- Johann Lukas von Hildebrandt – Royal Castle, Warsaw (1711)
- Friedrich Karcher – Enlargement of Royal Castle, Warsaw (1700)
- Augustyn Wincenty Locci and Andreas Schlüter – Reconstruction of Wilanów Palace (1677–1696)

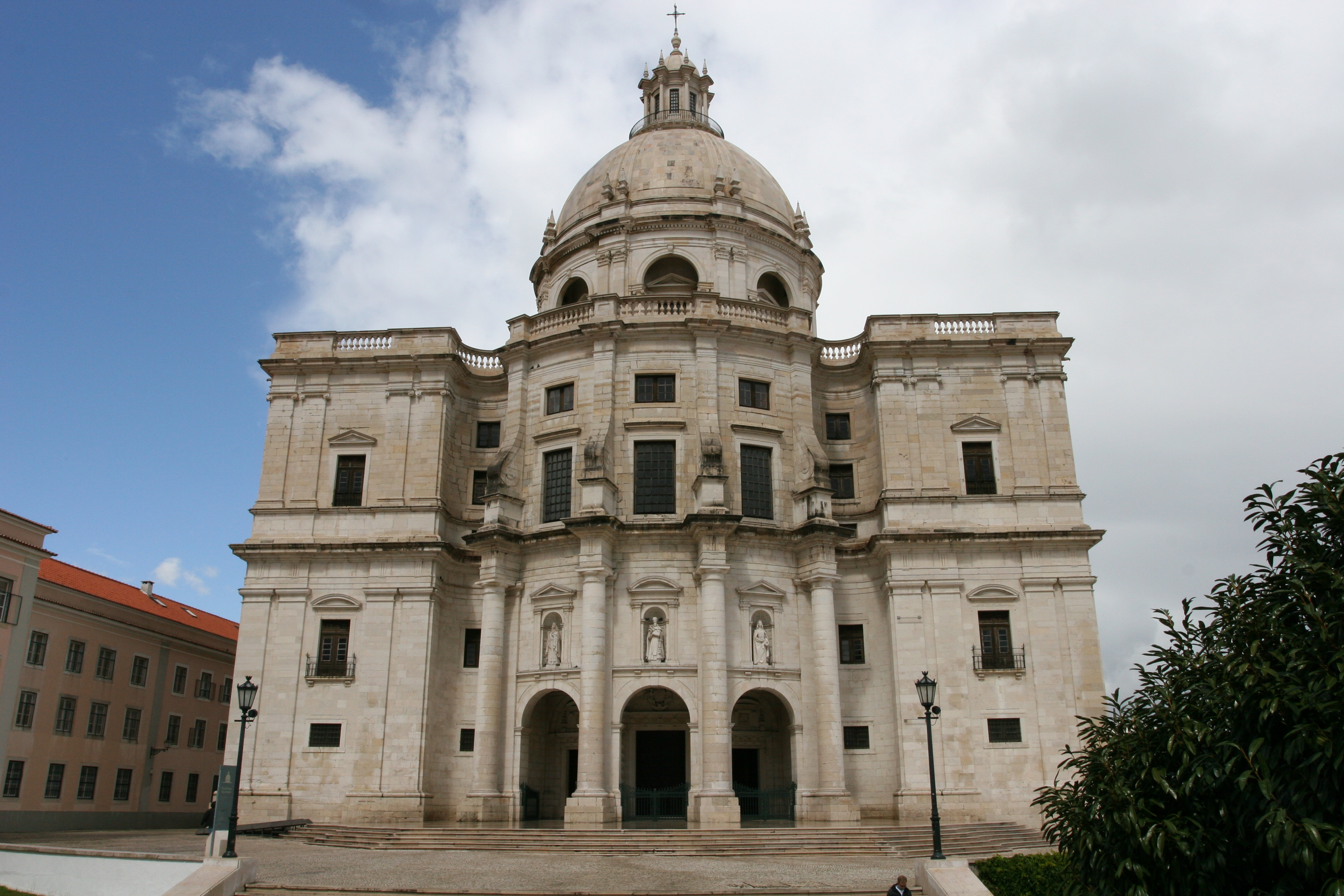
Church of Santa Engrácia, Lisbon (now National Pantheon of Portugal; begun 1681)

=== Portugal ===
- João Antunes – Church of Santa Engrácia, Lisbon (now National Pantheon of Portugal; begun 1681)
- João Frederico Ludovice - Palace of Mafra, Mafra (1717-1730)
- Biblioteca Joanina, Coimbra (1717)
- Nicolau Nasoni – Clérigos Church in Porto (1732–1763); Mateus Palace in Vila Real (1739–1743)
- Arsenal do Exército, Lisbon (now holds the Military Museum of Lisbon; begun 1760)

==== Portuguese Colonial Baroque ====
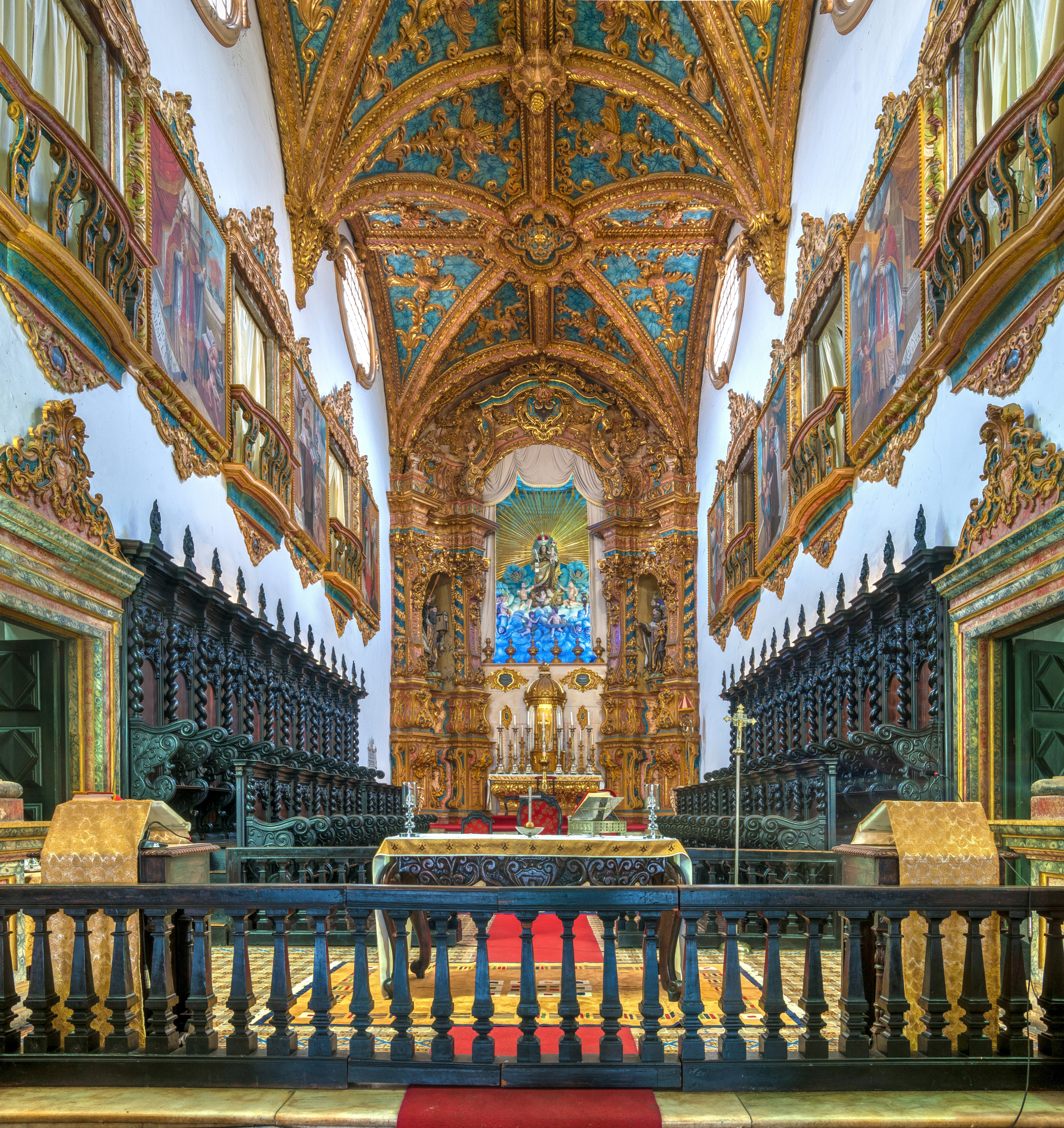
Interior of the Basilica and Convent of Nossa Senhora do Carmo, Recife, Brazil, built between 1665 and 1767

- Aleijadinho – Church of Saint Francis of Assisi (Ouro Preto), Brazil (1771–1794)
- Basilica and Convent of Nossa Senhora do Carmo, Recife, Brazil (1665–1767)
- Church of St. Anne, Talaulim, India (1577–1695)
- Church of Saint Dominic, Macau, China (1587)

=== Spain ===
- Fernando de Casas Novoa – West façade of Cathedral of Santiago de Compostela (1738–1750)
- Alonso Cano – Baroque additions to Granada Cathedral (1667)
- Leonardo de Figueroa – Palacio de San Telmo, Seville, (1682)
- Jose Benito de Churriguera – San Cayetano Church, Madrid – Altar of the Church of San Esteban, Salamanca (1693)
- Francisco Hurtado Izquierdo – Granada Charterhouse, Granada (1727–1764)

==== Spanish American Baroque ====
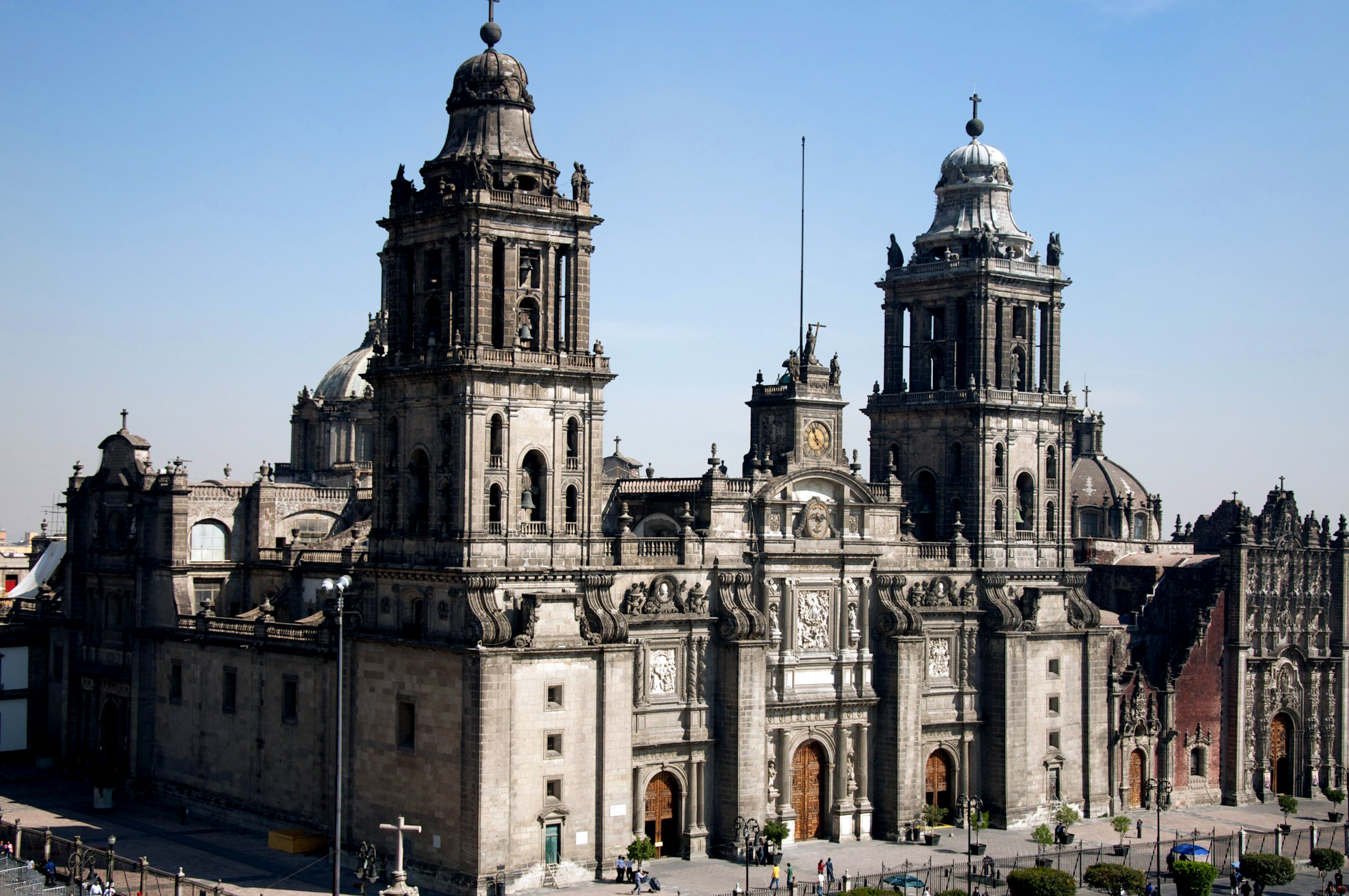
The Mexico City Metropolitan Cathedral built from 1573 to 1813.

- Lorenzo Rodriguez – Metropolitan Tabernacle of Mexico City Metropolitan Cathedral, Mexico (1749–1760)
- Cathedral Basilica of Zacatecas in Zacatecas City, Mexico (1729–1772)
- Spaniard José de la Cruz, Antonio de Nava and Luigi Tomassi – Cathedral of Chihuahua, Mexico, (1725–1760)
- Convent of San Francisco, Madero Street, Mexico City, built around the 16th century
- Flemish Jean-Baptiste Gilles and Diego Martínez de Oviedo – Iglesia de la Compañía de Jesús, Cusco, Peru (1668)
- Juan Miguel de Veramendi, Juan Correa, Miguel Gutiérrez Sencio – Cusco Cathedral, in Cusco, Peru (1560–1664)
- Palacio de Torre Tagle, in Lima, Peru (1715)
- Cathedral Basilica of Lima, Peru (1535–1649)
- Basilica and Convent of Nuestra Señora de la Merced, Lima, Peru (1535)
- Basilica of San Francisco, La Paz, Bolivia (1743–1772)
- Havana Cathedral in Cuba, built between 1748 and 1777
- Basilica Menor de San Francisco de Asís in Havana, Cuba, built between 1580 and 1738.

=== Nordic Countries ===
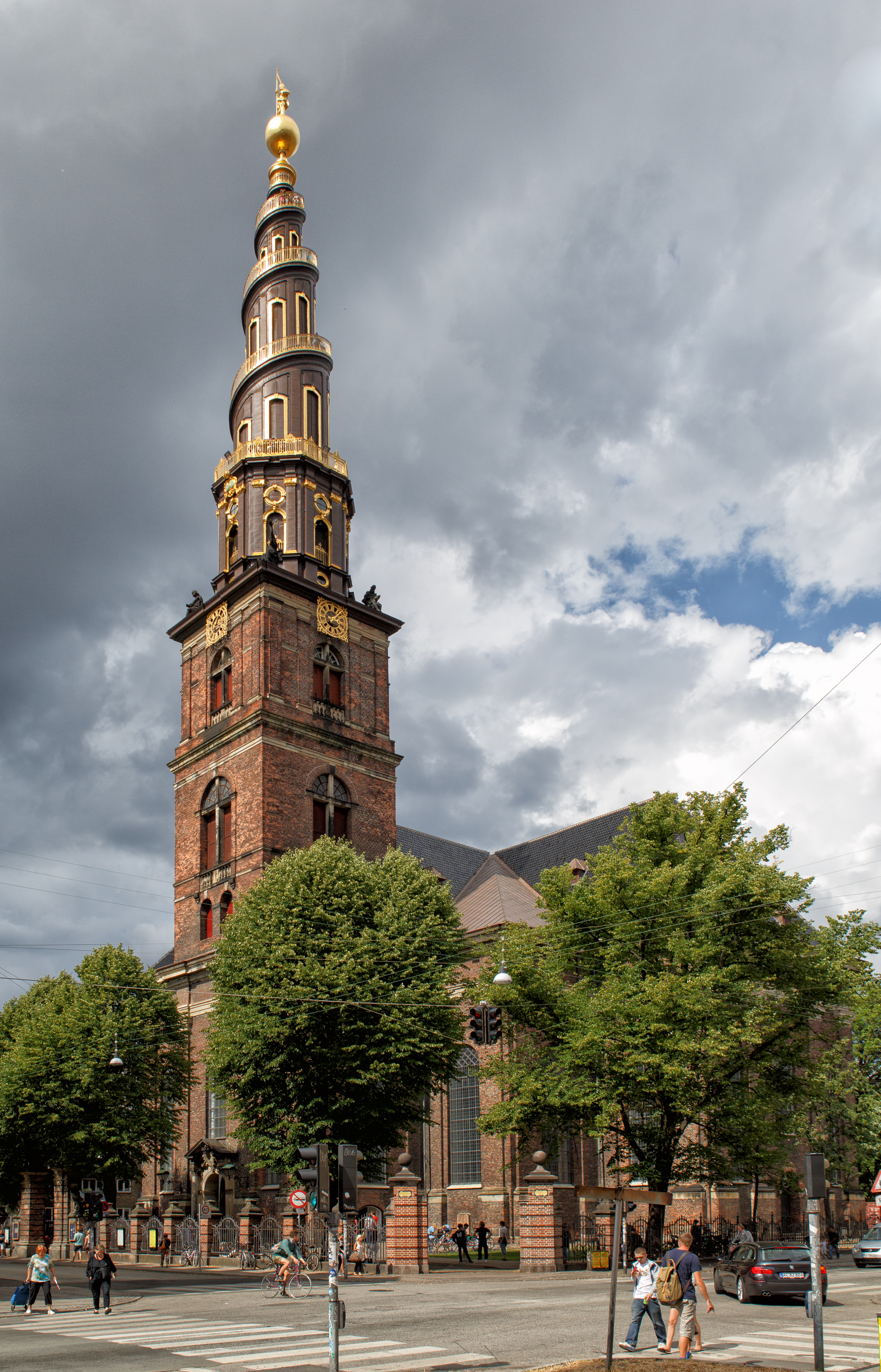
Church of Our Saviour, Copenhagen (1682–1747)

- Elias David Häusser (Denmark) – Christiansborg Palace (1st)
- Lambert van Haven (Denmark) – Church of Our Saviour, Copenhagen (1682–1747)
- Nicodemus Tessin the Elder (Sweden) – Drottningholm Palace (1662–1681) – Kalmar Cathedral in Småland, Sweden (1660–1703)

=== Russia ===
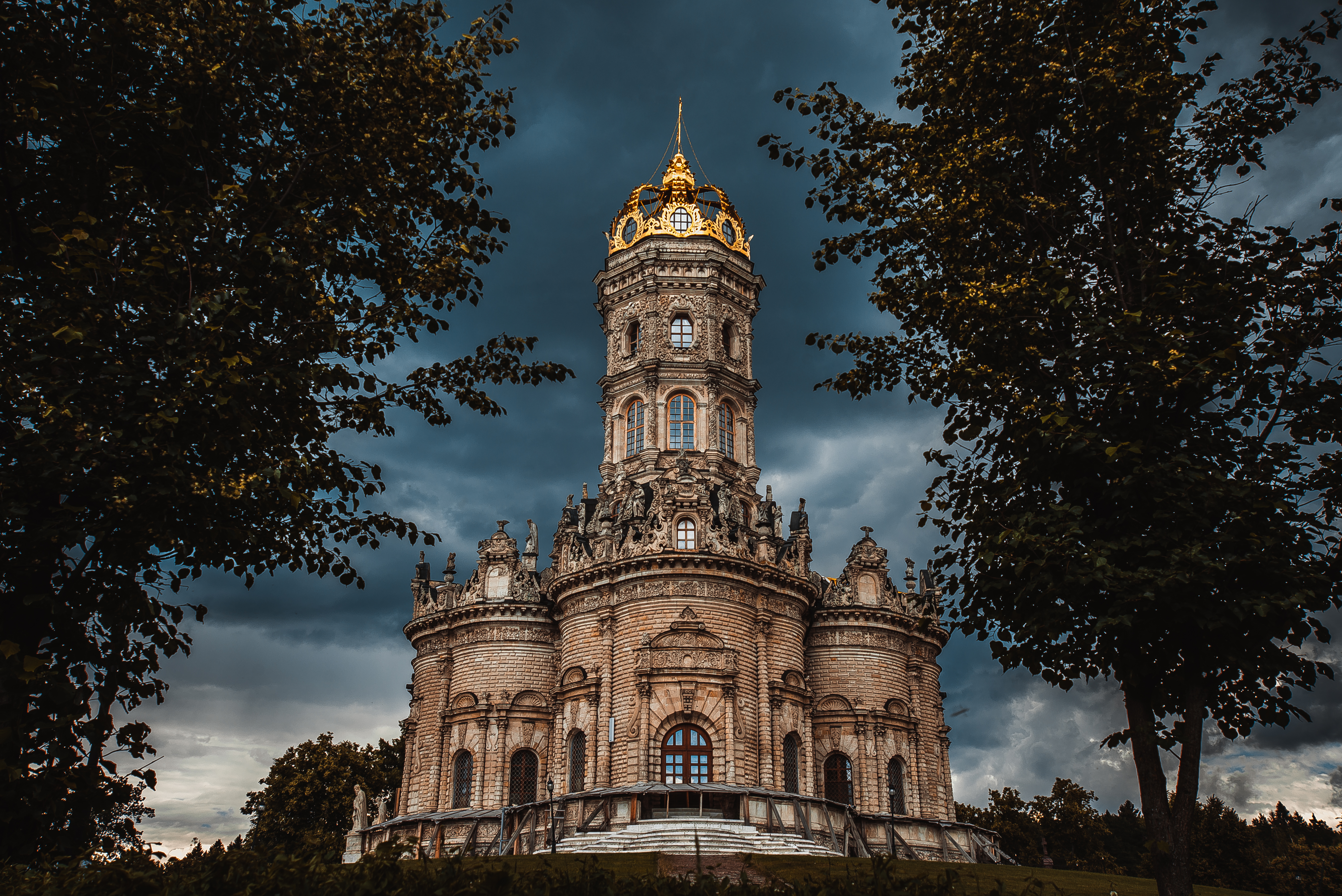
Znamenskaya Church (Dubrovitsy) 1690-1698 Podolsk, Moscow

- Giovanni Maria Fontana – Menshikov Palace (Saint Petersburg) (1710–1720s)
- Georg Johann Mattarnovi – Kunstkamera in Petrine Baroque, Saint Petersburg, completed by 1727
- Bartolomeo Francesco Rastrelli – Façade of Smolny Convent, Saint Petersburg (1748–1754); Stroganov Palace (1753—1754); Vorontsov Palace (Saint Petersburg) (1749—1757); Winter Palace in Saint Petersburg (1754–1762)
- Domenico Trezzini – Peter and Paul Fortress, Saint Petersburg (1706–1740)
- Mikhail Zemtsov – Transfiguration Cathedral (Saint Petersburg) (1743–54)

=== Ukraine ===
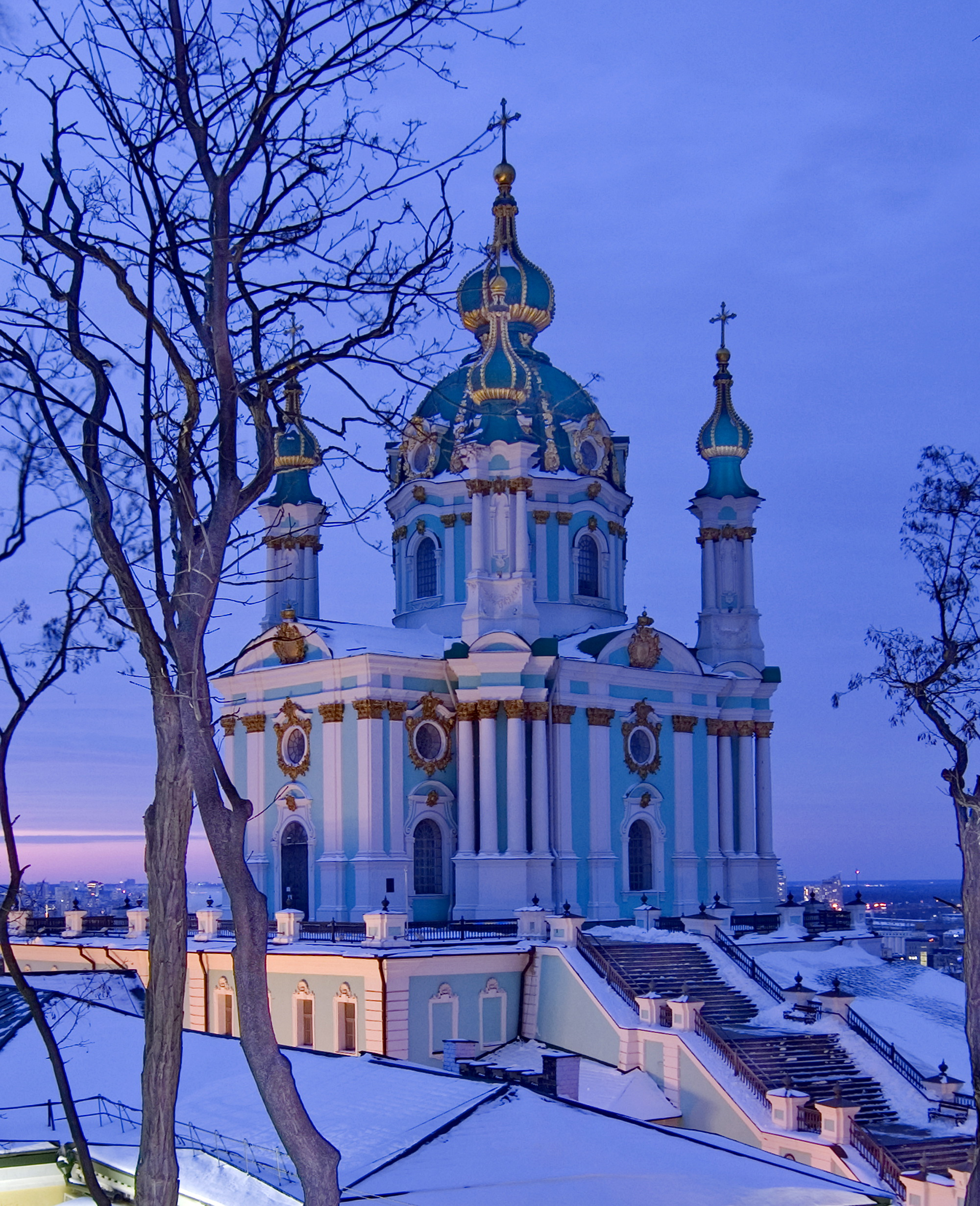
St Andrew's Church, Kyiv

- Francesco Bartolomeo Rastrelli – Mariinskyi Palace in Kyiv (1744–1752); St Andrew's Church, Kyiv (1744–1767), both in Elizabethan style
- By the command of Yakiv Lyzohub – House of Lyzohub (1690s); Catherine's Church, Chernihiv (1715)
- St. Nicholas Cathedral, Nizhyn (17th century), the prototype of Ukrainian baroque
- Most of Vydubychi Monastery (17th–19th century)
- Portions of Kyiv Pechersk Lavra (17th–18th century)

=== Malta ===
- Bontadino de Bontadini – Wignacourt Aqueduct (1612–1615) and Wignacourt Arch
- Francesco Bounamici – Church of the Jesuits, Valletta (1635)
- Mattia Preti – St John's Co-Cathedral (1660s); Our Lady of Victories Church, Valletta (1752)
- Lorenzo Gafà – Saint Lawrence's Church, Vittoriosa (1681–97); St. Paul's Cathedral, Mdina (1696–1705); the Cathedral of the Assumption, Victoria (1697–1711)
- Andrea Belli – Auberge de Castille (1741–45)

== See also ==
- List of Baroque architecture
- List of Baroque residences
- Baroque music
- Baroque sculpture
- Ottoman Baroque architecture

== Bibliography ==
- Bailey, Gauvin Alexander. Baroque & Rococo. London: Phaidon Press, 2012.
- Bourke, John. Baroque Churches of Central Europe. London: Faber, 1962 (2nd revised ed.)
- Cabanne, Perre (1988), L'Art Classique et le Baroque, Paris: Larousse, ISBN 978-2-03-583324-2
- De Morant, Henry (1970). Histoire des arts décoratifs (in French). Librarie Hachette.
- Ducher, Robert, Caractéristique des Styles, (1988), Flammarion, Paris (In French); ISBN 2-08-011539-1
- Goodwin, Godfrey (1971). A History of Ottoman Architecture. Thames & Hudson. ISBN 0-500-27429-0.
- Hopkins, Owen (2014). Les styles en architecture. Dunod. ISBN 978-2-10-070689-1.
- Kuban, Doğan (2010). Ottoman Architecture. Translated by Mill, Adair. Antique Collectors' Club. ISBN 9781851496044.
- Oudin, Bernard (1992), Dictionnaire des Architects (in French), Paris: Seghers, ISBN 2-232-10398-6
- Robbins Landon, H. C. and David Wyn Jones (1988) Haydn: His Life and Music. Thames and Hudson.
- Rüstem, Ünver (2019). Ottoman Baroque: The Architectural Refashioning of Eighteenth-Century Istanbul. Princeton University Press. ISBN 9780691181875.
- Sitwell, Sacheverell. Southern Baroque Revisited. London: Weidenfeld & Nicolson, 1967.
- Texier, Simon (2012). Paris- Panorama de l'architecture. Parigramme. ISBN 978-2-84096-667-8.
- Toman, Rolf (2015). L'art baroque architecture, sculpture, peinture (in French). Cologne-Paris: H.F. Ullmann. ISBN 978-3-8480-0856-8.
