= List of building types =

This is a list of building types. It is sorted by broad category: residential buildings, commercial buildings, industrial buildings, and infrastructural buildings.

== Residential ==
=== Single-family detached ===
Examples of single-family detached house types include:

- Bungalow
- Central-passage house (North America)
- Chattel house (Caribbean)
- Château (France)
- Cottage (various)
- Courtyard house (various)
- Konak (Asia)
- Log house (various)
- Mansion (various)
- Housebarn (various)
- Split level home (various)
- Upper Lusatian house (Europe)

=== Single-family attached (small multi-family) ===
- Duplex, semi-detached, double-decker, or two-family
- Triplex, triple-decker or three-family
- Quadplex, quadruple, or four-family
- Townhouse or terraced house

=== Large multi-family (apartments/flats/condos) ===
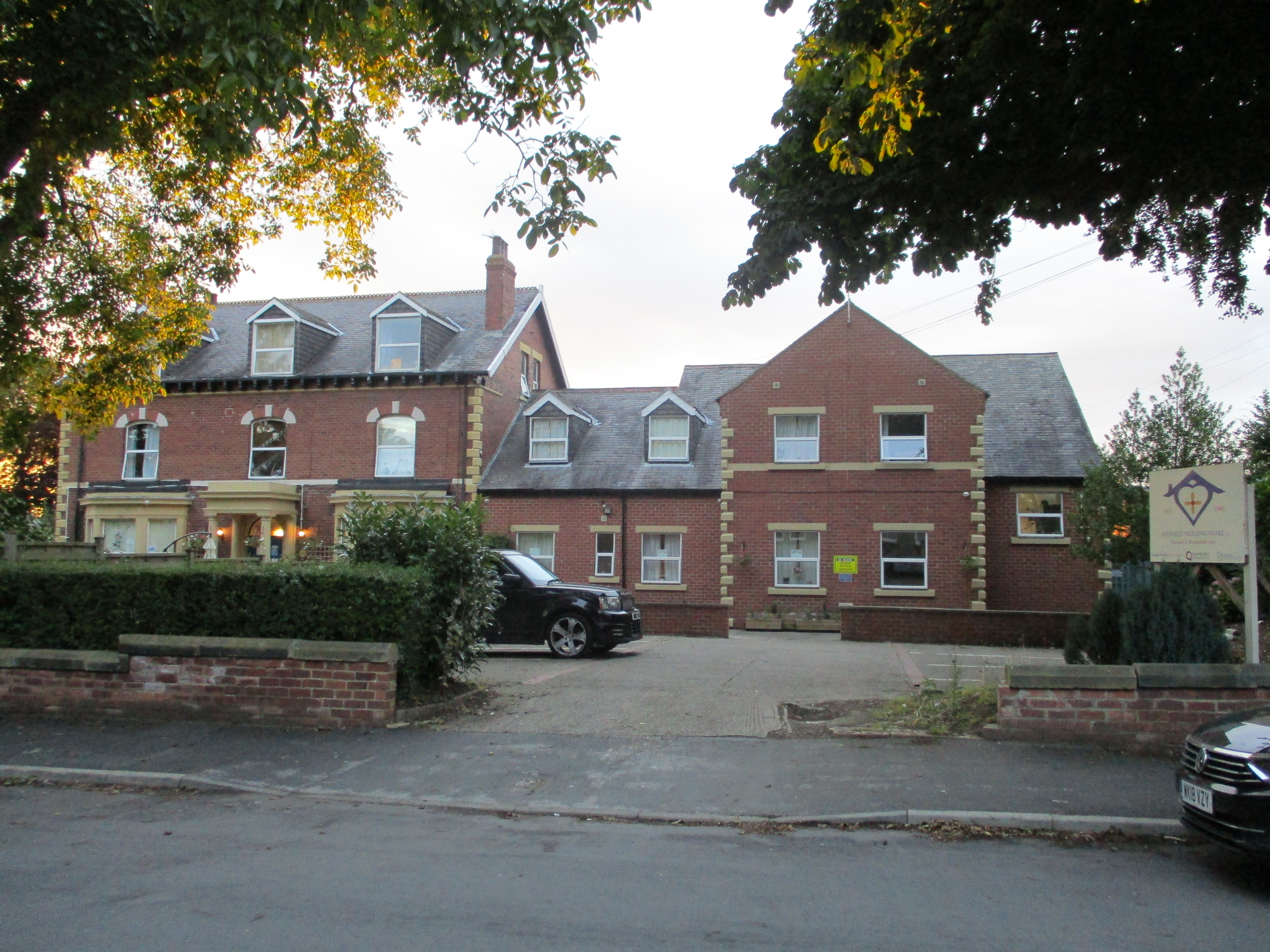
A nursing home in Wetherby, England, U.K.

- Garden or walk-up apartments: 1–5 stories, 50–400 units, no elevators
- Mid-rise apartments/condos: 5–9 stories, 30–110 units, with elevators
- High-rise apartments/condos: 9+ stories, 100+ units, professionally managed
- Special-purpose group housing
  - Retirement home
  - Nursing home
  - Dormitory

=== Public ===
- Official residence
- Palace
  - Archbishop's Palace
  - Bishop's palace
  - Electoral Palace
  - Episcopal Palace
  - Presidential palace
  - Residenz

== Commercial ==
Commercial buildings, generally, are buildings used by businesses to sell their products to consumers.

=== Office ===
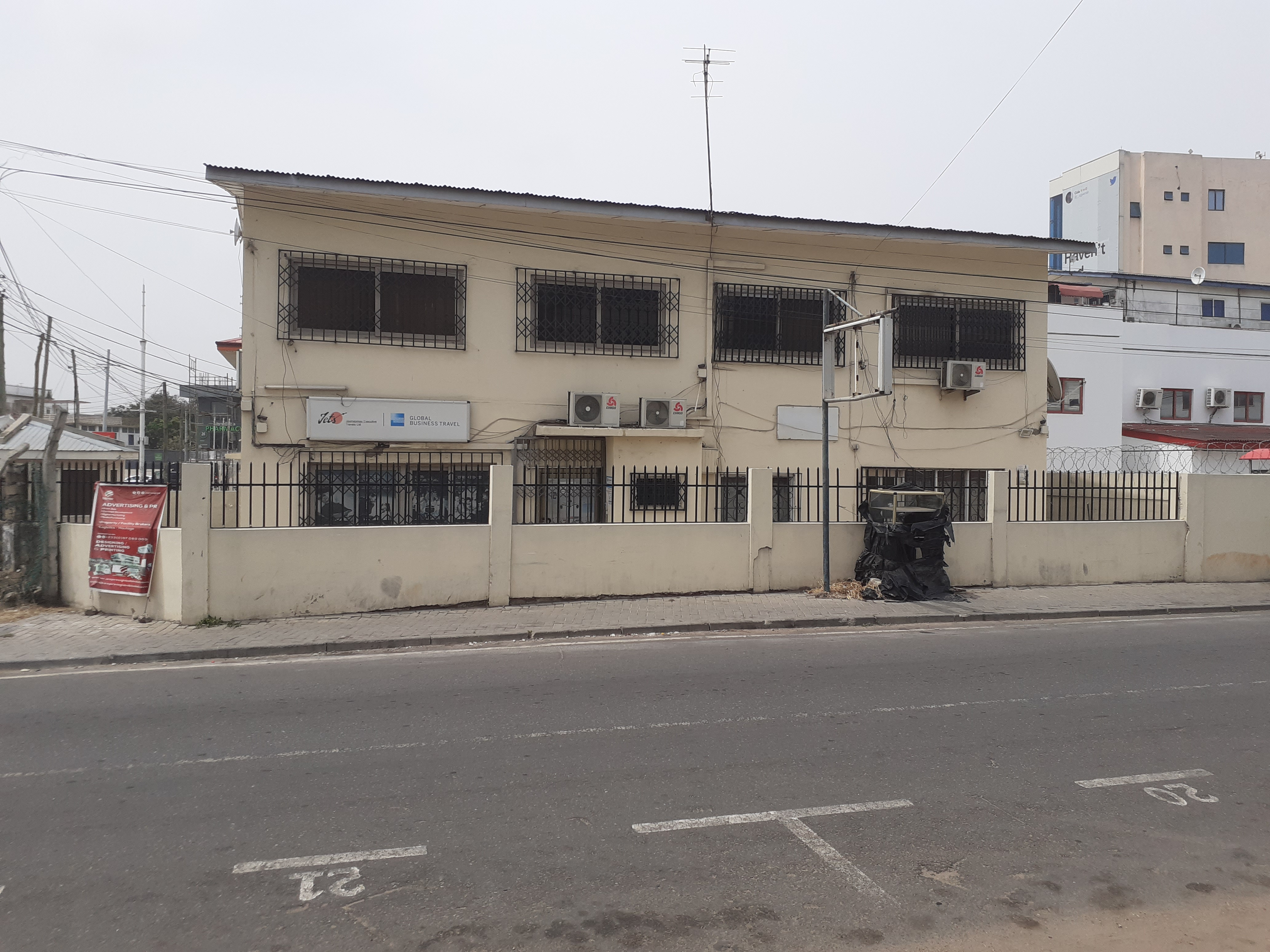
An office building in Accra, Ghana.

Office buildings are generally categorized by size and by quality (e.g., "a low-rise Class A building")

- Office buildings by size
  - Low-rise (less than 7 stories)
  - Mid-rise (7–25 stories)
  - High-rise (more than 25 stories), including skyscrapers (over 40 stories)
- Office buildings by quality
  - Trophy or 5-star building: A landmark property designed by a recognized architect
  - Class A or 4-star building: Rents in the top 30-40% of the local market; well-located; above-average upkeep and management; usually older than a trophy/5-star building
  - Class B or 3-star building: Rents between Class A and Class C; fair-to-good locations; average upkeep and management
  - Class C or 2-star building: Rents in the bottom 10-20% of the local market; less-desirable locations; below-average upkeep and management
  - 1-star building: Does not meet the needs of typical tenants; may be obsolete and/or in need of significant renovation

=== Retail ===
Retail buildings are categorized by their configuration and size

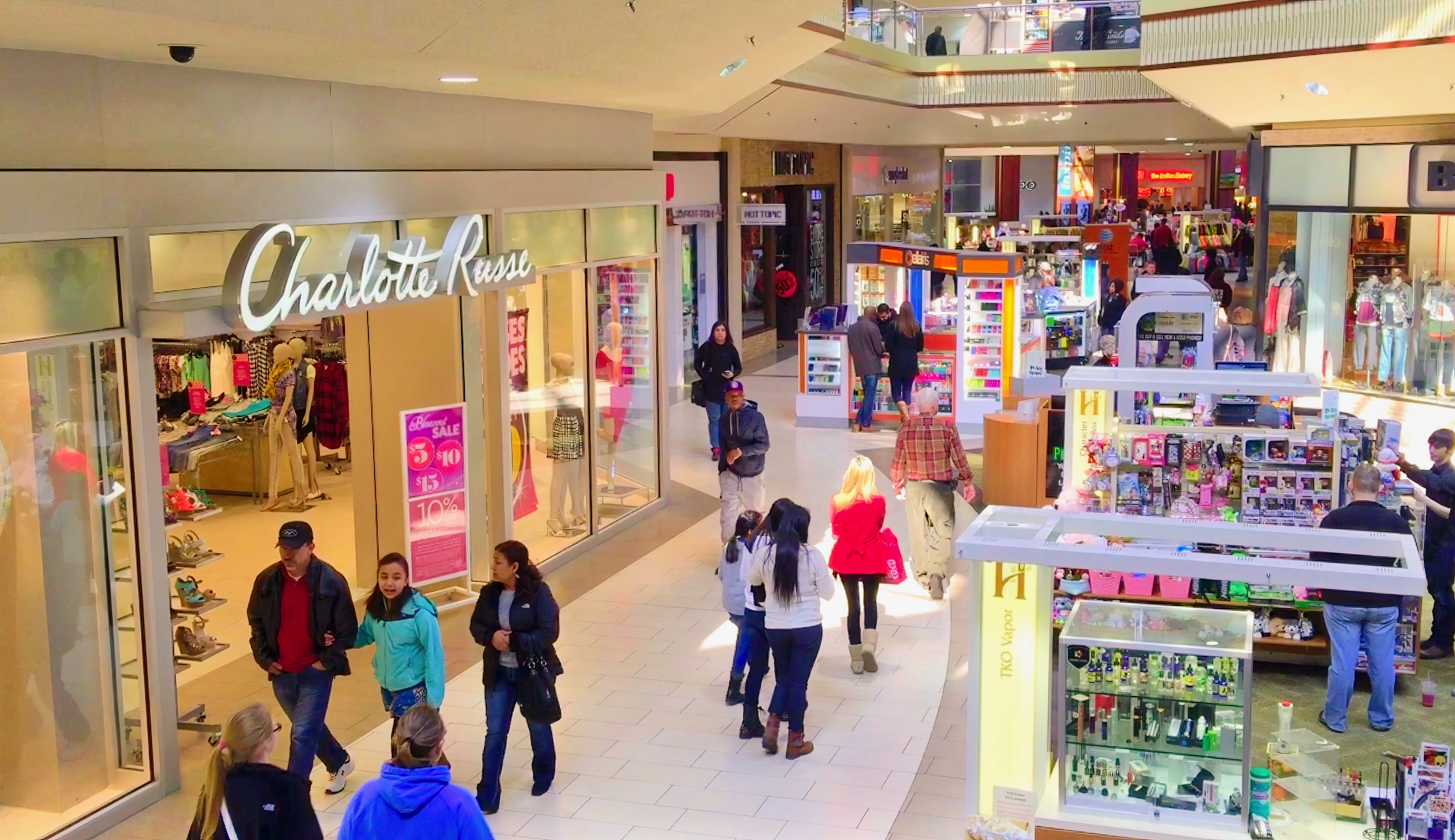
Interior view of a shopping mall in Chattanooga, Tennessee, U.S.

- Non-freestanding (also known as shopping centers or shopping malls)
  - Super-regional shopping center: enclosed space; 800,000+ sqft; 5+ anchor stores with other tenants that sell a very large variety of goods
  - Regional shopping center: enclosed space; 400,000–800,000 sqft; 1–5 anchor stores with other tenants that sell a large variety of goods
  - Community shopping center: open space; 125,000–400,000 sqft; provides general merchandise and commodities (e.g., supermarket, discount department store)
  - Neighborhood shopping center: open space; 3,000–125,000 sqft; provides commodities to nearby neighborhoods (e.g. drug store)
  - Strip or convenience shopping center: open space; less than 30,000 sqft; located along suburban transportation arteries on shallow land parcels; a strip may be configured in a straight line, or have an "L" or "U" shape
  - Lifestyle center: "Main Street" concept with pedestrian circulation in core and vehicular circulation along perimeter; upscale national chain specialty stores, dining or entertainment (e.g. The Grove, Los Angeles, CA; Americana at Brand, Glendale, CA)
- Freestanding: any stand-alone retail structure that is not part of a complex
  - Big box: freestanding category-dominant retailer; 50,000+ sqft (e.g. The Home Depot, Target, Walmart)
  - Power center: among the largest types of retail properties; 3+ big box anchor stores; multiple large buildings with parking lot in front and loading in back; smaller retailers usually clustered in a community shopping center configuration
  - Retail outlet: manufacturers' outlet stores; 50,000–400,000 sqft
  - Pop-up retail: a retail location designed to only be in a location temporarily (e.g., a retail store that only opens during a holiday season)

=== Hotels ===
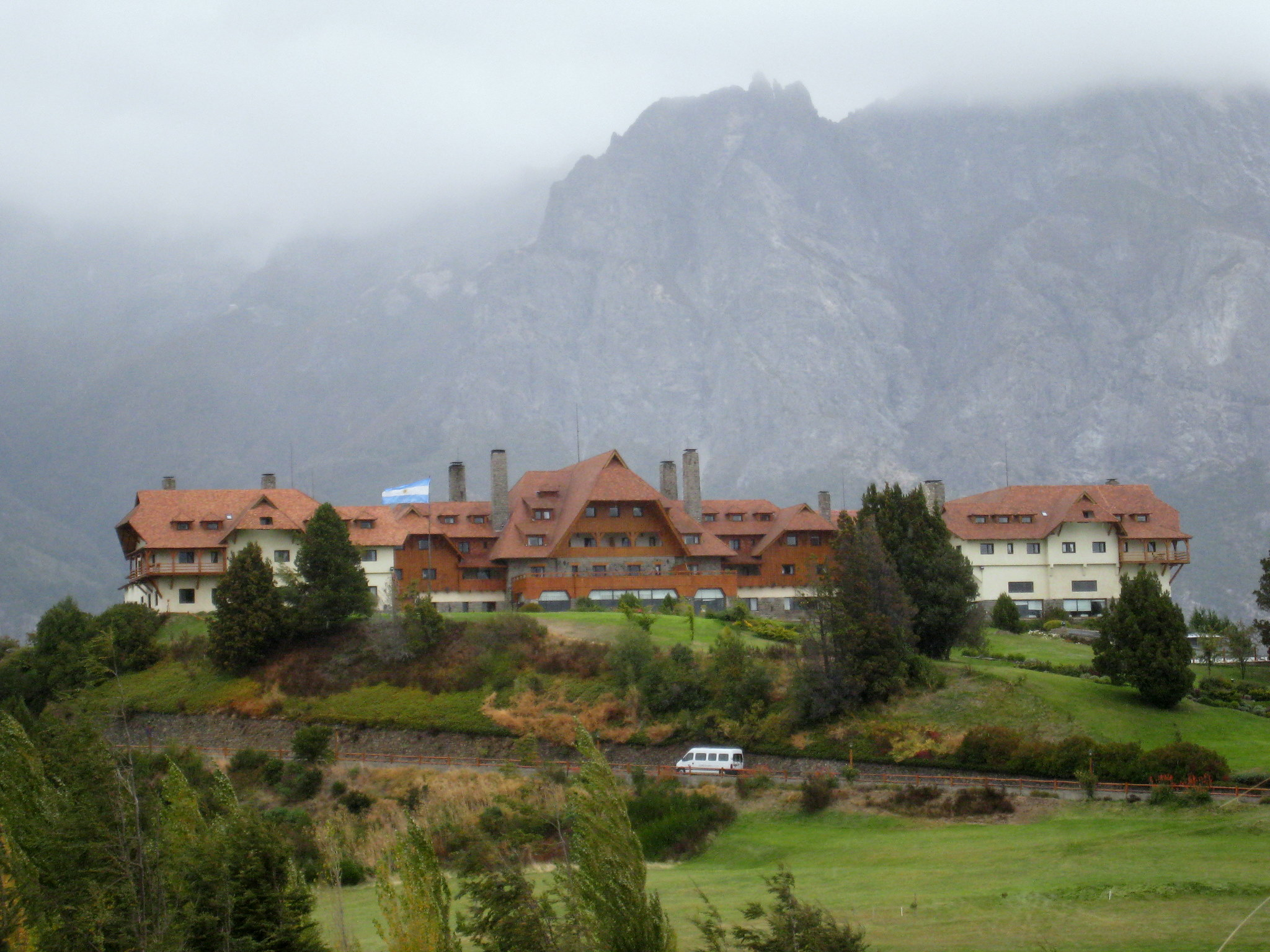
A hotel in Bariloche, Argentina

- Full service hotel
- Travelers' hotel
  - Motel
  - Choultry
  - Caravanserai
- Extended stay hotel
- Boutique hotel
- Casino
- Resort
- Bunkhouse

=== Special-purpose ===
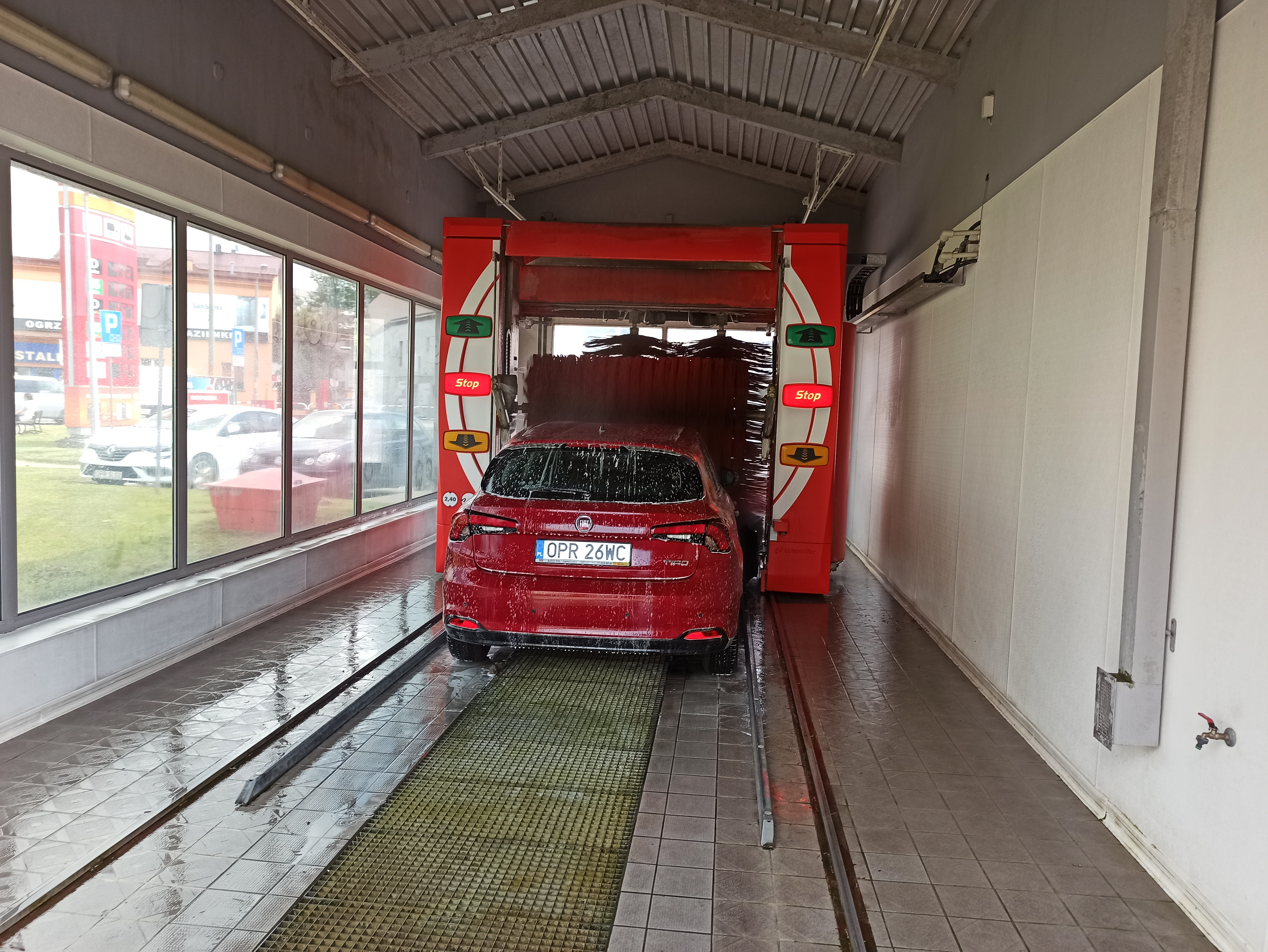
A car wash in Prudnik, Poland

- Theme or amusement park
- Aquarium
- Bar (establishment)
- Bowling alley
- Car wash
- Funeral home
- Marina
- Movie theater
- Self-storage
- Theater
- Zoo

== Industrial ==
Industrial buildings are primarily used for the production and storage/distribution of goods, among other uses.

- Factory
  - Physical plant
- Mill

=== Manufacturing ===
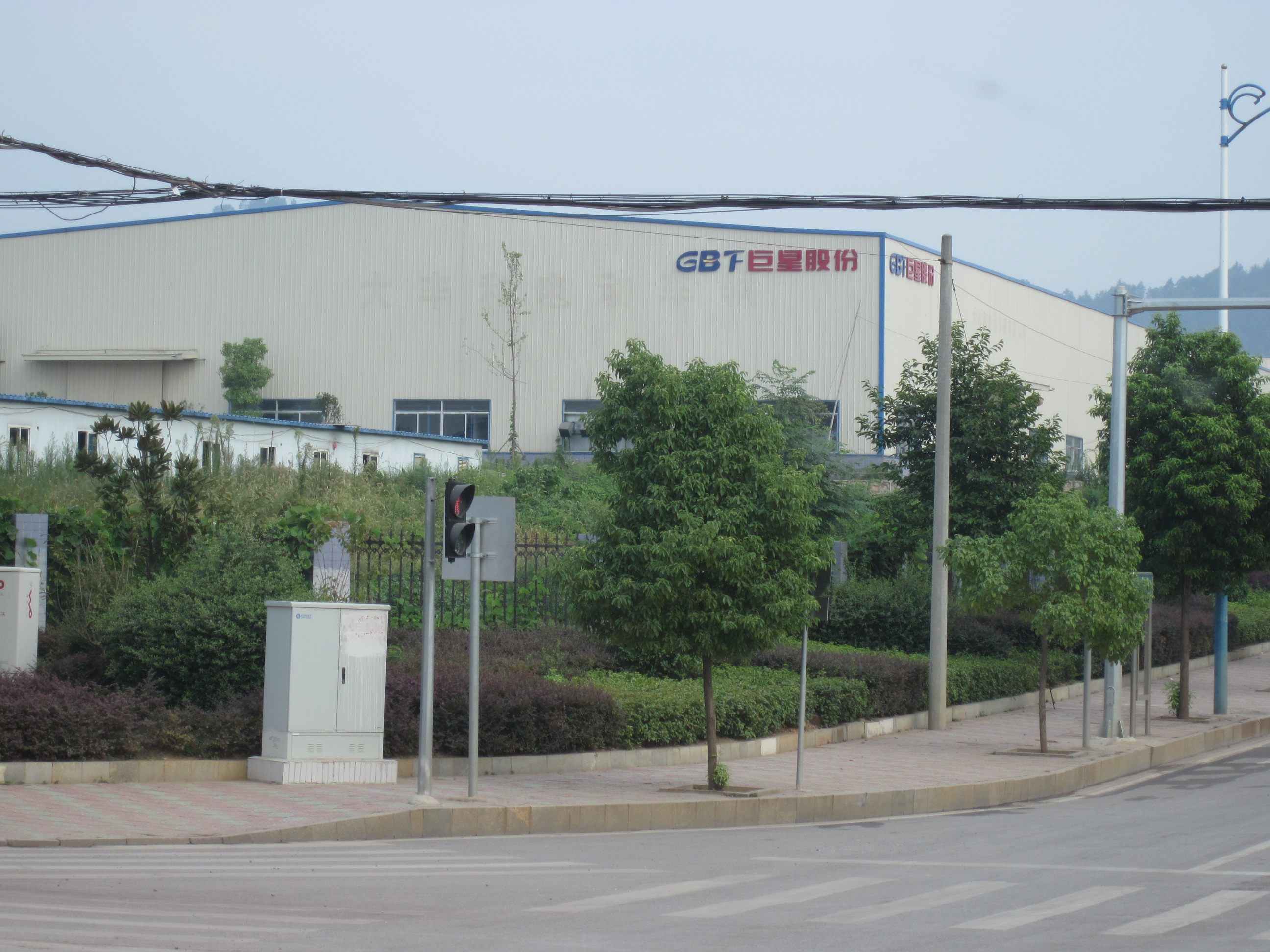
A heavy manufacturing plant in Loudi, Hunan province, China

- Light manufacturing
- Heavy manufacturing

=== Warehouse/distribution ===
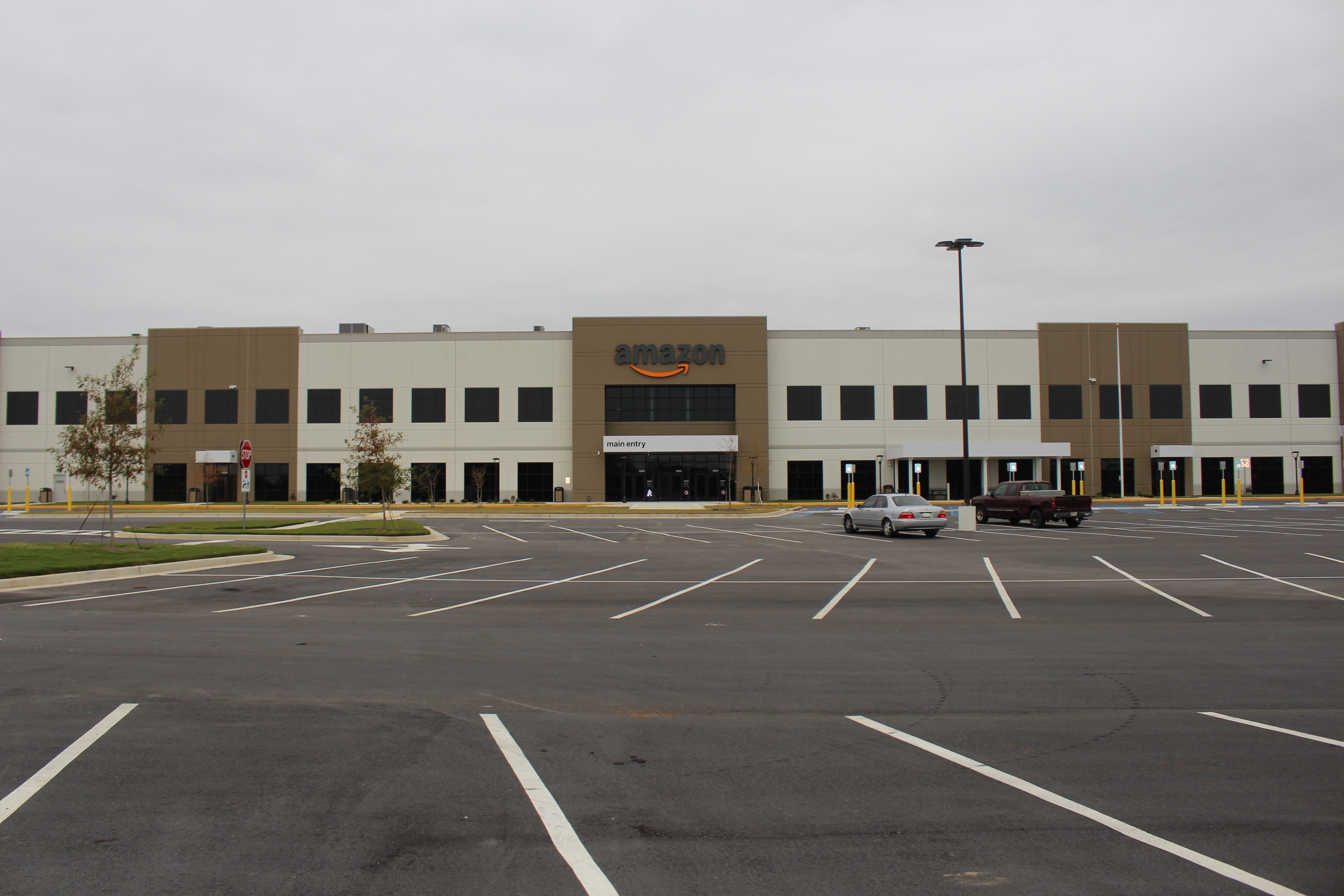
A fulfillment center in Macon, Georgia, U.S.

- Warehouses
  - Bulk
  - Ice house
  - Cold/cool/refrigerator/freezer storage
  - High-cube
  - Warehouse store
- Distribution/fulfillment centers
  - Container terminals

=== Flex space ===
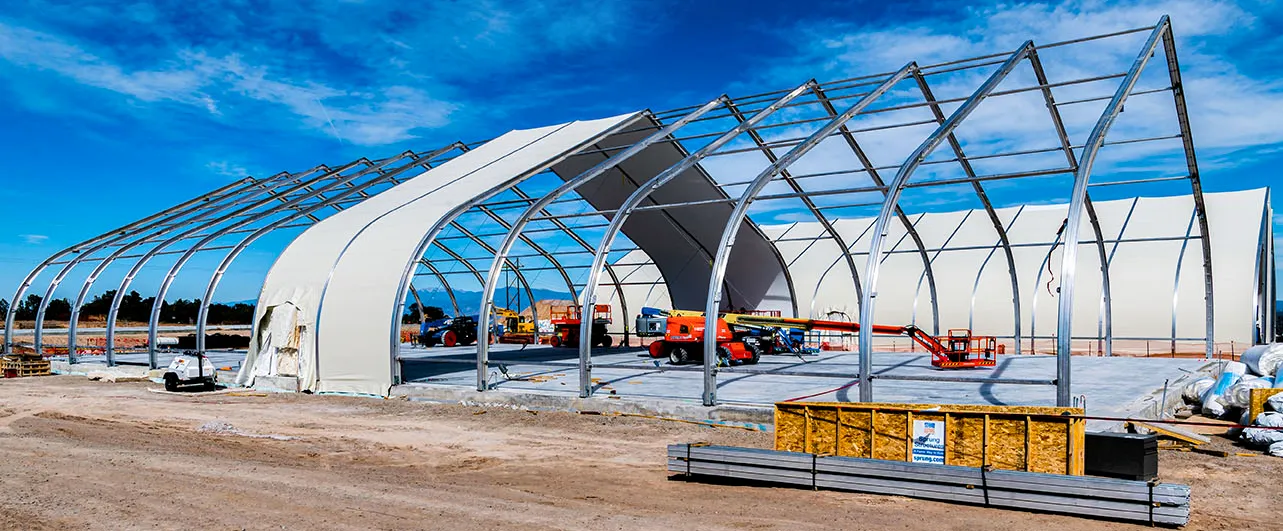
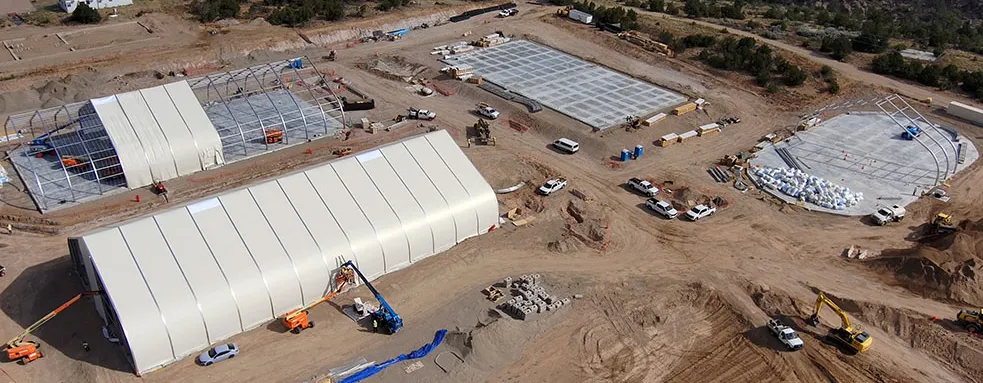
Tension fabric buildings
- Office building
- Laboratory
- Data center
- Call center
- Showroom
- Tension fabric building

== Infrastructure ==
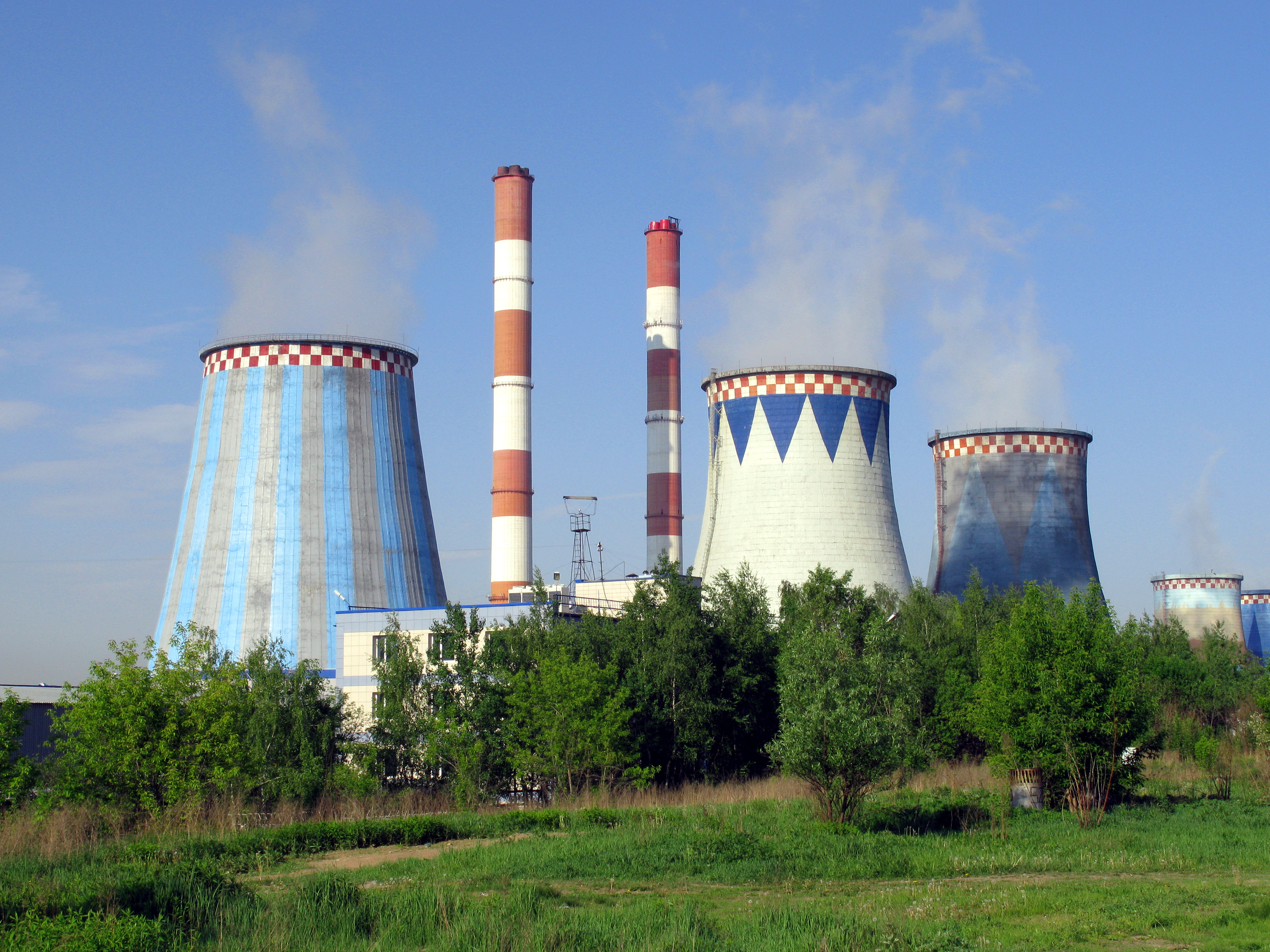
A power plant in Moscow, Russia

Infrastructure buildings house equipment and facilities related to public infrastructure.

- Composting
- Desalination plant
- Waste transfer
- Power generation
  - Power plant
  - Thermal power plant
  - Fossil-fuel power station
  - Nuclear power plant
  - Geothermal power
  - Biomass power plant
  - Renewable energy power station
- Electric power distribution
  - Substation
  - Converter hall
  - Rotary converter plant
- Transmitter building
- Dams
- Pump house
- Fake building

== Agricultural ==
- Abattoir
- Barn
- Chicken coop or chickenhouse
- Cow-shed
- Farmhouse
- Granary, Hórreo
- Greenhouse
- Hayloft
- Pigpen or sty
- Root cellar
- Shed
- Silo
- Slaughterhouse
- Stable
- Storm cellar
- Well house
- Crib
- Windmill
- Workshop

== Institutional ==
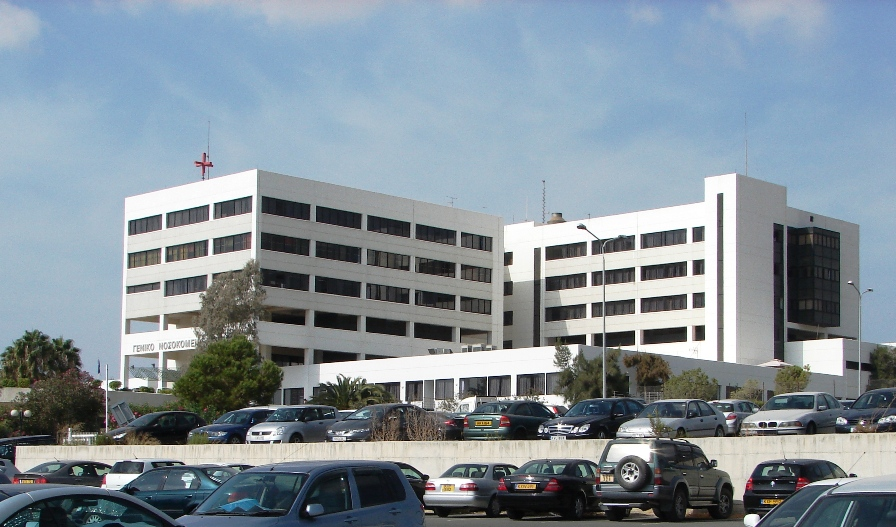
A hospital in Limassol District, Cyprus

- Medical
  - Hospital
  - Nursing homes
  - Mental hospital
  - Sanatorium
- Educational
  - Academy
  - Archive
  - College
  - Elementary schools
  - Middle school
  - Orphanage
  - Secondary School
  - School
  - University
  - Nursery school
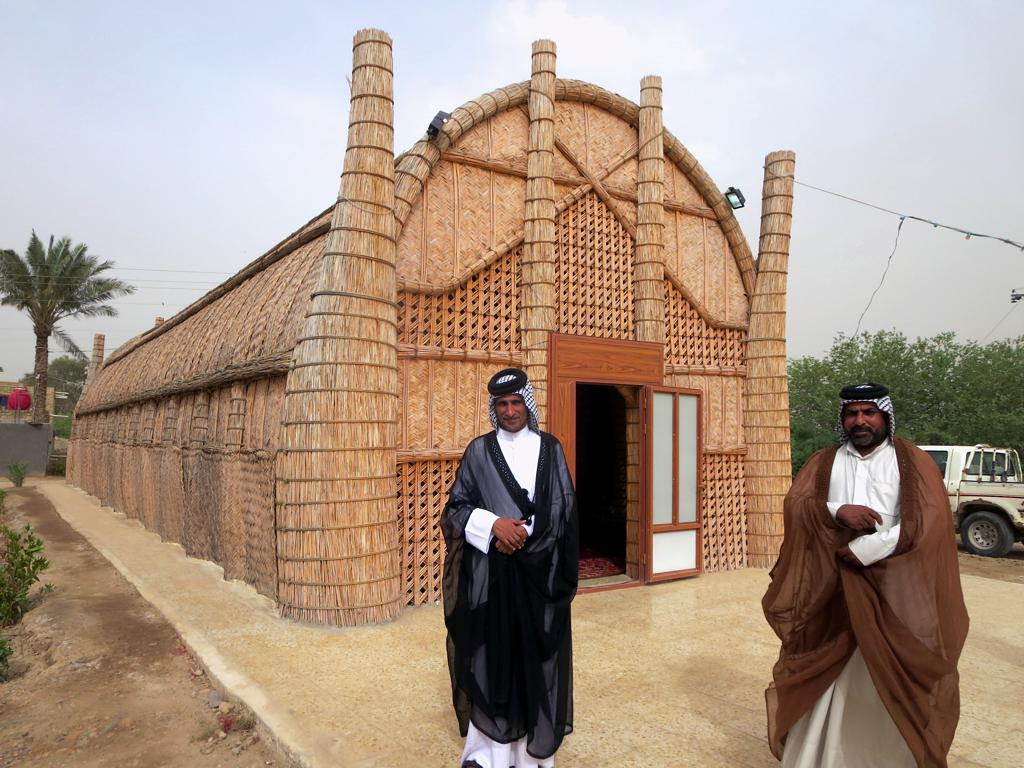
    A mudhif near Lagash, Iraq
- Civic
  - Arena (or stadium)
  - Library
  - Mudhif: a traditional reed house made by the Madan people of Iraq
  - Museum
  - Observatory
  - Community hall
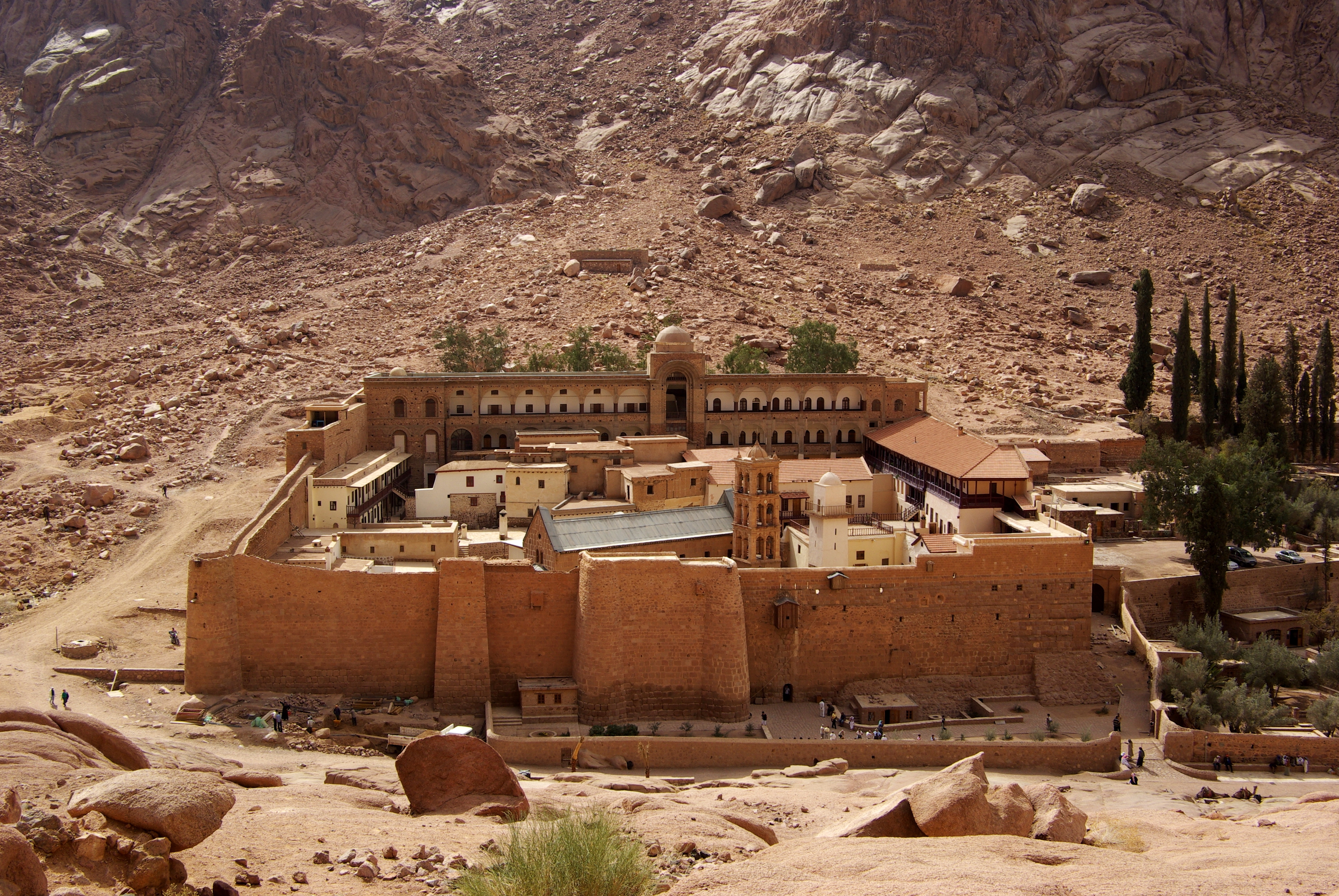
    A monastery in the Sinai Peninsula, Egypt
  - Research institute
    - Think tank
- Religious Facilities (Place of worship)
  - Church
    - Basilica
    - Cathedral
      - Duomo
    - Chapel
    - Oratory
    - Martyrium
  - Imambargah
  - Monastery
  - Mithraeum
  - Shrine
  - Synagogue
  - Temple
  - Pagoda
  - Gurdwara
  - Hindu temple
  - Mosque
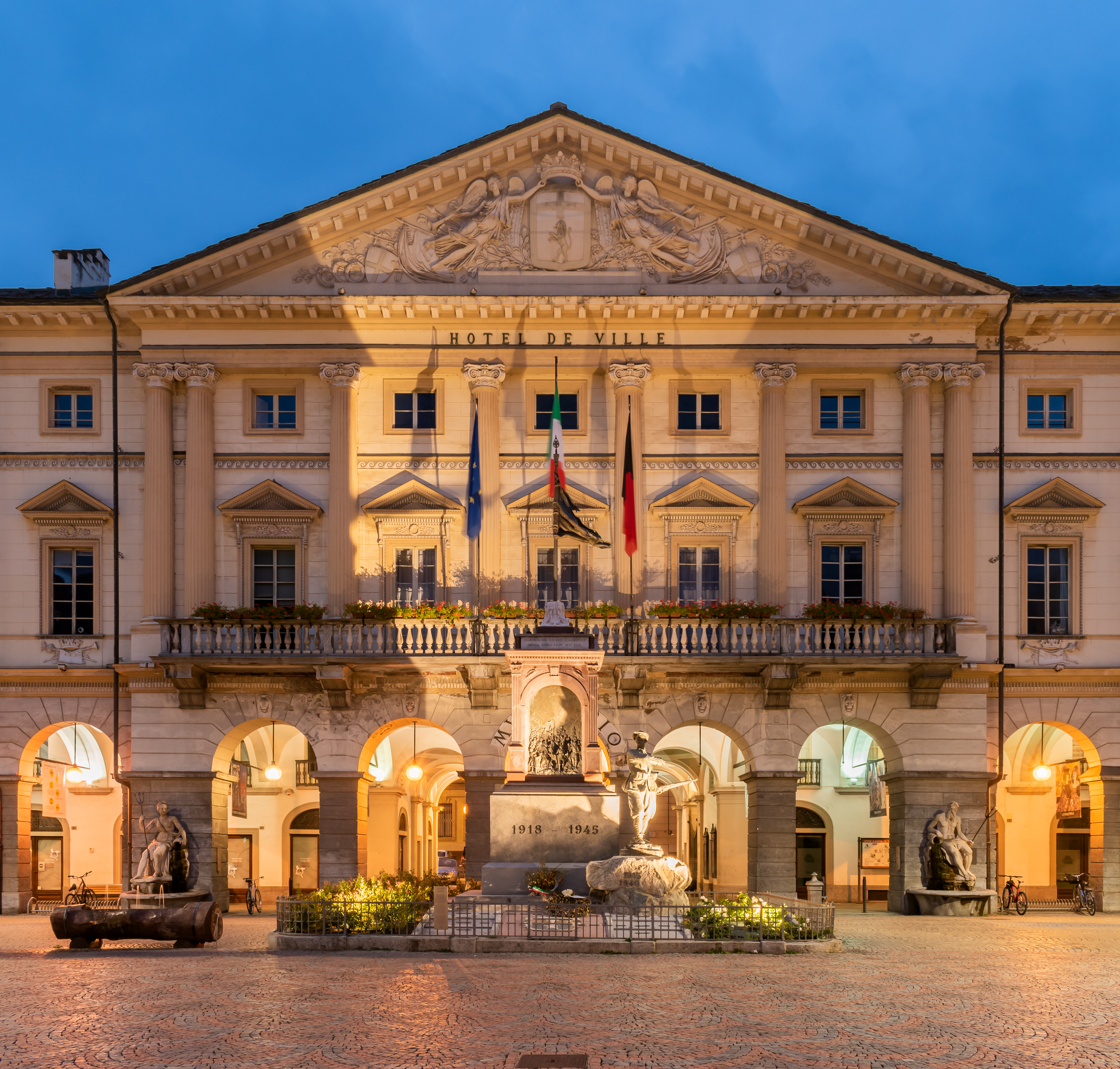
    Town hall of Aosta, Italy
- Government
  - Town hall
    - Guildhall
  - Consulate
  - Courthouse
  - Embassy
  - Fire station
  - Meeting house
  - Moot hall
  - Parliament house
  - Police station
  - Post office
  - Assembly
- Military
  - Arsenal
  - Barracks
  - Bunker
  - Blockhouse
  - Citadel
  - Missile launch facility
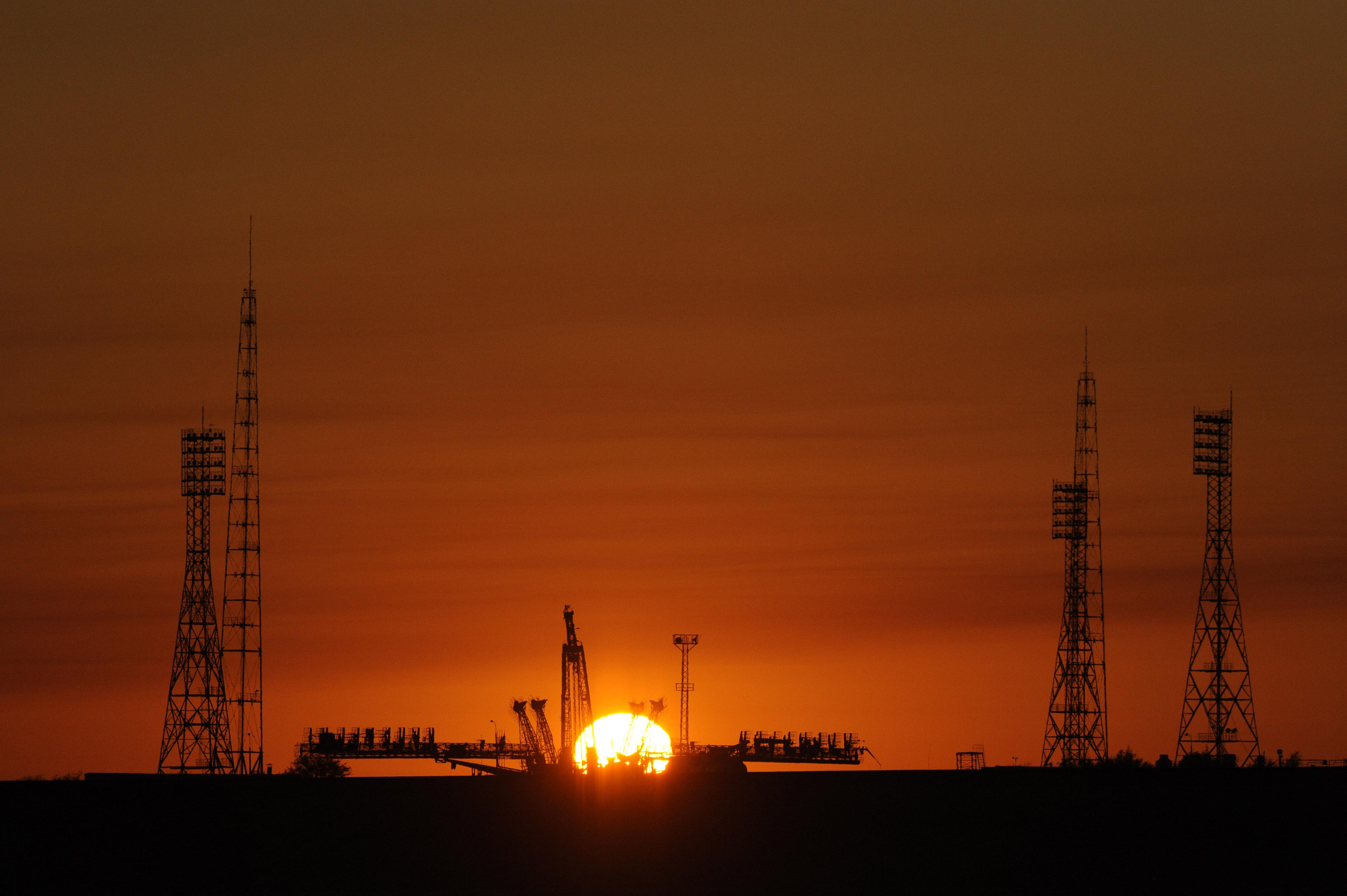
    A spacepad in Baikonur, Kazakhstan
- Transport
  - Airport
  - Bus station
  - Metro (subway, underground) station
  - Taxi station
  - Railway station (or, primarily in US, Railroad station)
    - Signal box
  - Lighthouse
  - Shipyard
  - Spaceport
  - Hovercraft
  - Passenger terminal
  - Boathouse
  - Parking garage
  - Hangar
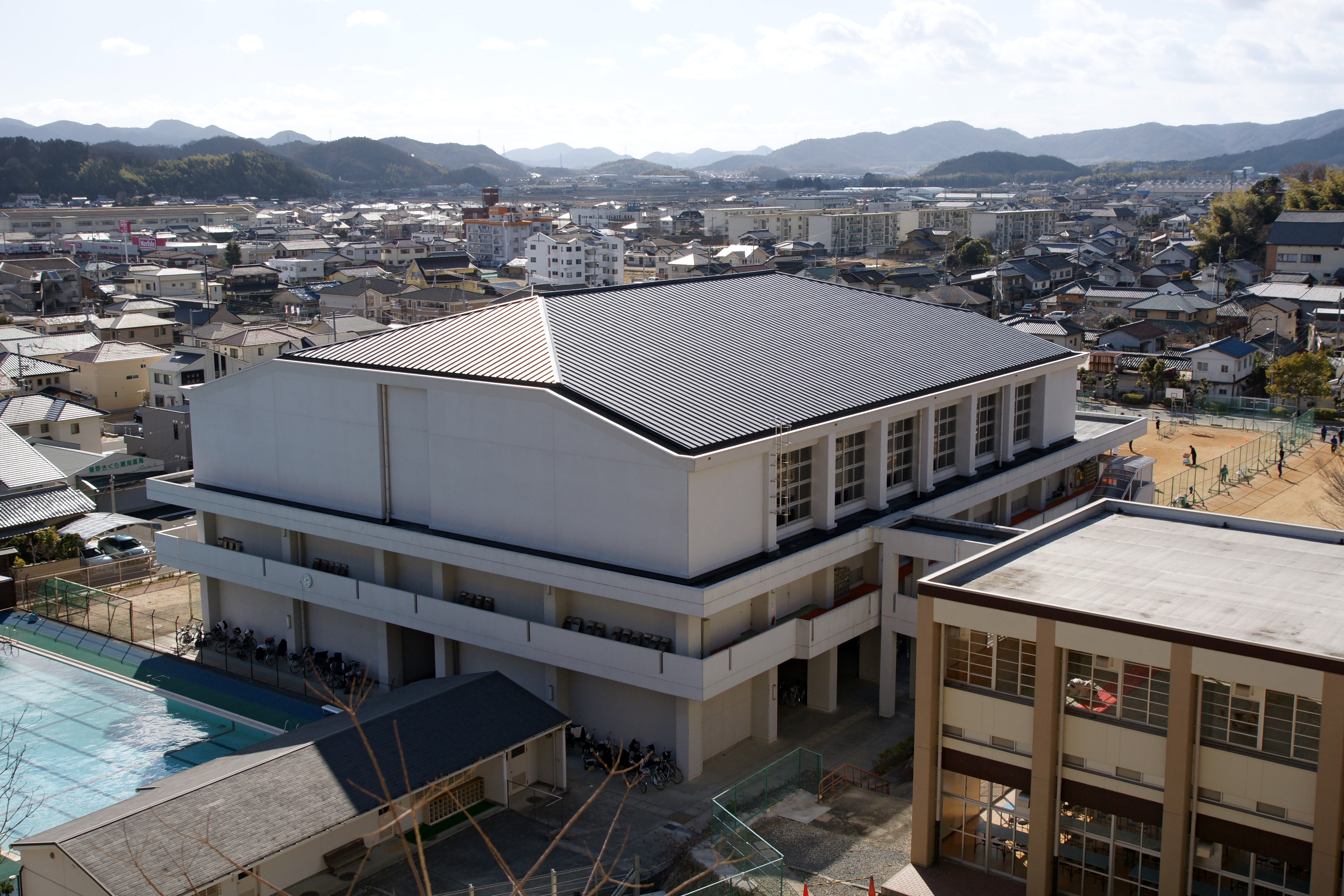
    A gym in Tatsuno, Hyōgo Prefecture, Japan
- Historical
  - Communal oven
- Other
  - Aul
  - Bathhouse
  - Film studio
  - Folly
  - Gym
  - Pavilion
  - Shelter

== Other ==
- Bakehouse
- Tent

== See also ==
- Outline of architecture
