= Episcopal Palace =

An Episcopal Palace is the official residence of a bishop. It may refer to:

- Episcopium, the office and associated residence of a bishop
- Episcopal Palace, Angra do Heroísmo, Portugal
- Episcopal Palace, Astorga, Spain
- Episcopal Palace, Braga, Portugal
- Episcopal Palace of Cordoba, Spain
- Episcopal Palace, Fiesole, Italy
- Episcopal Palace, Grosseto, Italy
- Episcopal palace, Oradea, Romania
- Episcopal Palace, Porto, Portugal
- Episcopal Palace, Siena, Italy
- Episcopal Palace, Strasbourg, France
- Episcopal Palace, Vienna, Austria
- Episcopal Summer Palace, Bratislava, Slovakia
- Krakow Episcopal Palace (Warsaw), Poland
- Wells episcopal palace, Somerset, England

== See also ==
- Bishop's Palace (disambiguation)
- Archbishop's Palace (disambiguation), including Archepiscopal Palace
- List of palaces
