= Bishop's Castle (disambiguation) =

Bishop's Castle may be:

- Bishop's Castle, town in Shropshire, England
  - Bishop's Castle Community College, a secondary school in the town
- Bishop's Castle (UK Parliament constituency)
- Bishop's Castle, Glasgow, former castle in Glasgow, Scotland
- Bishop Castle, Colorado, USA

== See also ==
- Bishop's Palace (disambiguation)
