= Prince-elector =

Members of the electoral college that elected the emperor of the Holy Roman Empire

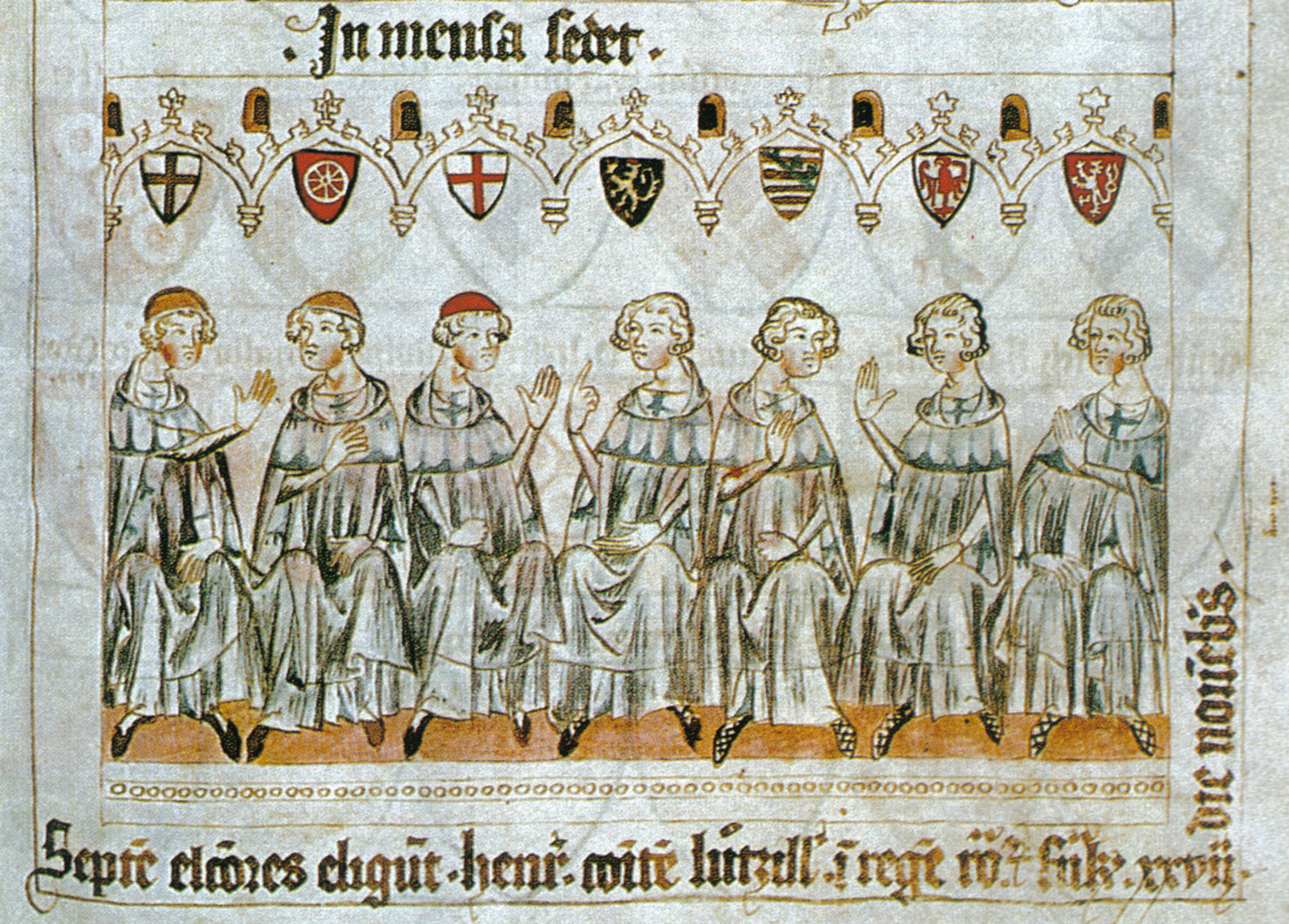
The imperial prince-electors Left to right: Archbishop of Cologne, Archbishop of Mainz, Archbishop of Trier, Count Palatine, Duke of Saxony, Margrave of Brandenburg and King of Bohemia (Codex Balduini Trevirorum, c. 1340)

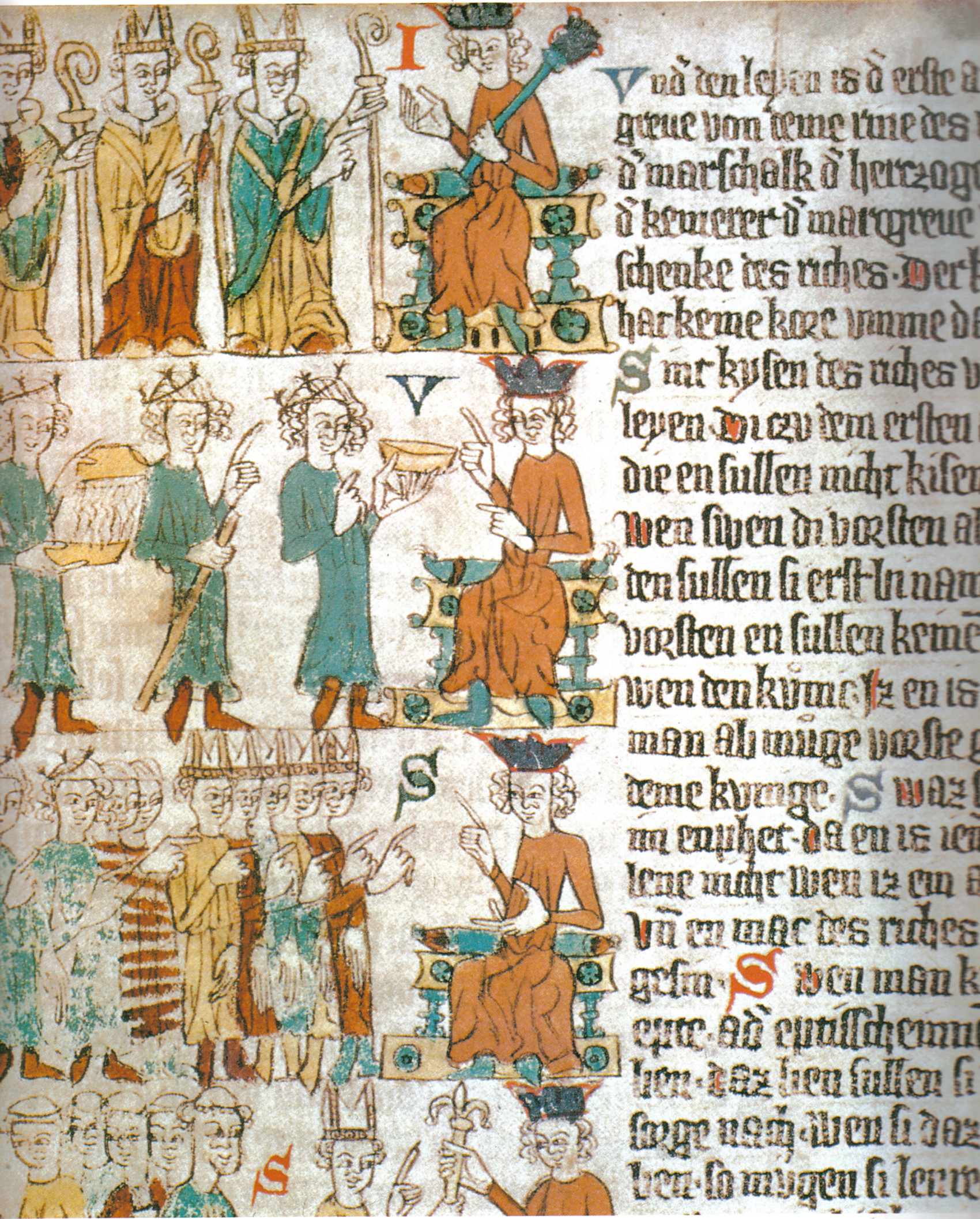
Choosing the king. Above: the three ecclesiastical princes choosing the king, pointing at him. Middle: the Count Palatine of the Rhine hands over a golden bowl, acting as a servant. Behind him, the Duke of Saxony with his marshal's staff and the Margrave of Brandenburg bringing a bowl of warm water, as a valet. Below, the new king in front of the great men of the empire (Heidelberg Sachsenspiegel, around 1300).

A Prince-Elector of the Holy Roman Empire (Latin: Sacri Romani Imperii Princeps Elector; German: Kurfürst [ˈkuːɐ̯ˌfʏʁst], pl. Kurfürsten [ˈkuːɐ̯ˌfʏʁstn̩], from the Middle High German kure "choice" and the German Fürst "prince") was a member of the Electoral College of the Holy Roman Empire, which elected the Holy Roman Emperor, initially according to formally unregulated customs, and since 1356 in accordance with provisions of the Golden Bull. The office was abolished in 1806, upon the Dissolution of the Holy Roman Empire.

From the 13th century onwards, a small group of prince-electors gained the privilege of electing the King of the Romans. The king would then later be crowned Emperor by the pope. Charles V (elected in 1519) was the last emperor to be crowned (1530); his successors assumed the title "Elected Emperor of the Romans" (German: erwählter Römischer Kaiser; Latin: electus Romanorum imperator) upon their coronation as kings.

The dignity of elector carried great prestige and was considered to be behind only the emperor, kings, and the highest dukes. The electors held exclusive privileges that were not shared with other princes of the Empire, and they continued to hold their original titles alongside that of elector.

The heir apparent to a secular prince-elector was known as an electoral prince (German: Kurprinz).

== Rights and privileges ==
Electors were rulers of Reichsstände (Imperial Estates), enjoying precedence over the other Imperial Princes. They were, until the 18th century, exclusively entitled to be addressed with the title Durchlaucht (Serene Highness). In 1742, the electors became entitled to the superlative Durchlauchtigste (Most Serene Highness), while other princes were promoted to Durchlaucht.

As rulers of Imperial Estates, the electors enjoyed all the privileges of princes, including the right to enter into alliances, to autonomy in relation to dynastic affairs, and to precedence over other subjects. The Golden Bull granted them the Privilegium de non appellando, which prevented their subjects from lodging an appeal to a higher Imperial court. Although this privilege, and some others, were automatically granted to Electors, they were not exclusive to them and many of the larger Imperial Estates were also to be individually granted some or all those rights and privileges.

== Imperial Diet ==
The electors, like the other princes ruling States of the Empire, were members of the Imperial Diet, which was divided into three collegia: the Council of Electors, the Council of Princes, and the Council of Cities. In addition to being members of the Council of Electors, most electors were also members of the Council of Princes by virtue of possessing territory or holding ecclesiastical position. The assent of both bodies was required for important decisions affecting the structure of the Empire, such as the creation of new electorates or States of the Empire.

Many electors ruled a number of States of the Empire or held several ecclesiastical titles, and therefore had multiple votes in the Council of Princes. In 1792, the Elector of Brandenburg had eight votes, the Elector of Bavaria six votes, the Elector of Hanover six votes, the King of Bohemia three votes, the Elector-Archbishop of Trier three votes, the Elector-Archbishop of Cologne two votes, and the Elector-Archbishop of Mainz one vote. Thus, of the hundred votes in the Council of Princes in 1792, twenty-nine belonged to electors, giving them considerable influence in the Council of Princes in addition to their positions as electors.

In addition to voting by colleges or councils, the Imperial Diet also voted in religious coalitions, as provided for in the Peace of Westphalia. The Archbishop of Mainz presided over the Catholic body, the corpus catholicorum, while the Elector of Saxony presided over the Protestant body, the corpus evangelicorum. The division into religious bodies was on the basis of the official religion of the state.

== Elections ==
The electors were originally summoned by the Archbishop of Mainz within one month of an Emperor's death, and met within three months of being summoned. On many occasions, however, there was no interregnum, as a new king had been elected during the lifetime of the previous Emperor. During any interregnum, imperial power was exercised by two imperial vicars under the terms of the Golden Bull. The Elector of Saxony was vicar in areas operating under Saxon law (Saxony, Westphalia, Hannover, and northern Germany), while the Elector Palatine was vicar in the remainder of the Empire (Franconia, Swabia, the Rhine, and southern Germany). The Elector of Bavaria sometimes replaced the Elector Palatine between 1623 and 1777, when the Elector Palatine inherited Bavaria.

Frankfurt regularly served as the site of the election from the 14th century on, but elections were also held at Cologne (1531), Regensburg (1575 and 1636), and Augsburg (1653 and 1690). An elector could appear in person or could appoint another elector as his proxy. More often, an electoral suite or embassy was sent to cast the vote; the credentials of such representatives were verified by the Archbishop of Mainz, who presided over the ceremony. The deliberations were held at the city hall, but voting occurred in the cathedral. In Frankfurt, a special electoral chapel, or Wahlkapelle, was used for elections. Under the Golden Bull, a majority of electors sufficed to elect a king, and each elector could cast only one vote. Electors were free to vote for whomsoever they pleased (including themselves), but dynastic considerations played a great part in the choice.

From the 16th century on, electors drafted a Wahlkapitulation, or electoral capitulation, which was presented to the king-elect. The capitulation may be described as a contract between the princes and the king, the latter conceding rights and powers to the electors and other princes. Once an individual swore to abide by the electoral capitulation, he assumed the office of King of the Romans.

In the 10th and 11th centuries, princes often acted merely to confirm hereditary succession in the Ottonian and Salian dynasties. But with the actual formation of the prince-elector class, elections became more open, starting with the election of Lothair III in 1125. The Staufen dynasty managed to get its sons formally elected in their fathers' lifetimes almost as a formality. After those lines ended in extinction, the electors began to elect kings from different families, so that the throne would not once again settle within a single dynasty. All kings elected from 1438 onwards were from among the Habsburg dynasty until 1740, when Austria was inherited by a woman, Maria Theresa, sparking the War of the Austrian Succession and the short-lived rule of a Bavarian Wittelsbach emperor. In 1745, Maria Theresa's husband, Francis I of Lorraine, was elected emperor. All of his successors were also from the Habsburg-Lorraine family.

=== High offices ===
Each elector held a "High Office of the Empire" (Reichserzamt) analogous to a modern cabinet office position and was a member of the ceremonial Imperial Household. The three spiritual electors became Archchancellors (German: Erzkanzler, Latin: Archicancellarius): the Archbishop of Mainz became Archchancellor of Germany, the Archbishop of Cologne became Archchancellor of Italy, and the Archbishop of Trier became Archchancellor of Burgundy. The secular electors were granted heraldic augmentations to their coats of arms reflecting their positions in the Household. These augmentations were displayed in three alternative ways:

- as an inescutcheon on their coat of arms (as in the case of the Arch-Steward, Treasurer, and Chamberlain);
- as dexter impalements (as in the case of the Arch-Marshal and Arch-Bannerbearer)
- integrated into the charge within the escutcheon (as in the case of the Arch-Cupbearer, where the Lion of Bohemia acquired a "simple crown" held in its dexter paw).

Holders of imperial offices and their heraldic augmentations
Imperial office (German, Latin)	Augmentation	Elector
Arch-Cupbearer (Erzmundschenk, Archipincerna)	A simple crown, Or (Note: Page from an armorial showing the arms of Emperor Frederick III, c. 1415–1493) (Note: Page from an armorial showing arms of Kaiser Maximilian I c. 1508–1519) (Note: German Kurrent script, in which the armorial sources are written)	King of Bohemia
Arch-Steward (Erztruchseß, Archidapifer)	Gules, an orb, Or	Elector Palatine (1356–1623); Elector of Bavaria (1623–1706); Elector Palatine (1706–1714); Elector of Bavaria (1714–1806)
Arch-Marshal (Erzmarschall, Archimarescallus)	Per fess sable and argent, two swords in saltire, gules	Elector of Saxony
Arch-Chamberlain (Erzkämmerer, Archicamerarius)	Azure, a scepter palewise, Or	Elector of Brandenburg
Arch-Treasurer (Erzschatzmeister, Archithesaurarius)	Gules, Crown of the Holy Roman Empire, or	Elector Palatine (1648–1706); Elector of Hanover (1710–1714); Elector Palatine (1714–1777); Elector of Hanover (1777–1806)
Arch-Bannerbearer (Erzbannerträger, Archivexillarius)	Azure, a lance party per fess, or, and gules bendwise flying to sinister chief a banner, or, with the Imperial Eagle	Elector of Hanover (1692–1710); Elector of Hanover (1714–1777); Elector of Württemberg (1803–1806)

Arms of Maximilian I, Duke of Bavaria and Prince-Elector, with inescutcheon of the Arch-Steward of the Holy Roman Empire

The Lesser coat of arms of the Elector of Hanover with inescutcheon of the Arch-Treasurer, borne as an inescutcheon on the royal arms of the United Kingdom by King George III

When the Duke of Bavaria replaced the Elector Palatine in 1623, he assumed the latter's office of Arch-Steward. When the Count Palatine was granted a new electorate, he assumed the position of Arch-Treasurer of the Empire. When the Duke of Bavaria was banned in 1706, the Elector Palatine returned to the office of Arch-Steward, and in 1710, the Elector of Hanover was promoted to the post of Arch-Treasurer. Matters were complicated by the Duke of Bavaria's restoration in 1714; the Elector of Bavaria resumed the office of Arch-Steward, while the Elector Palatine returned to the post of Arch-Treasurer, and the Elector of Hanover was given the new office of Archbannerbearer. The Electors of Hanover, however, continued to be styled Arch-Treasurers, though the Elector Palatine was the one who actually exercised the office until 1777, when he inherited Bavaria and the Arch-Stewardship. After 1777, no further changes were made to the Imperial Household; new offices were planned for the Electors admitted in 1803, but the Empire was abolished before they could be created. The Duke of Württemberg, however, started to adopt the trappings of the Arch-Bannerbearer.

The electors discharged the ceremonial duties associated with their offices only during coronations, where they bore the crown and regalia of the Empire. Otherwise, they were represented by holders of corresponding "Hereditary Offices of the Household". The Arch-Butler/Cupbearer was represented by the Hereditary Mundschenk (Note: Mundschenk, the historical German word that can be translated as either Butler or Cupbearer, as both words in its earliest forms are interchangeably the same role tasked with duties related to drinks.) (the Count of Althann), the Arch-Seneschal/Steward by the Hereditary Truchsess (Note: Truchseß, the historical German word that can be translated as either Seneschal or Steward, as both words in its earliest forms are interchangeably the same role tasked with duties related to food.) (the Count of Waldburg, who adopted the title into their name as "Truchsess von Waldburg"), the Arch-Chamberlain by the Hereditary Chamberlain (the Count of Hohenzollern), the Arch-Marshal by the Hereditary Marshal (the Count of Pappenheim), and the Arch-Treasurer by the Hereditary Treasurer (the Count of Sinzendorf). After 1803, the Duke of Württemberg as Arch-Bannerbearer assigned the count of Zeppelin-Aschhausen as Hereditary Bannerbearer.

== History ==
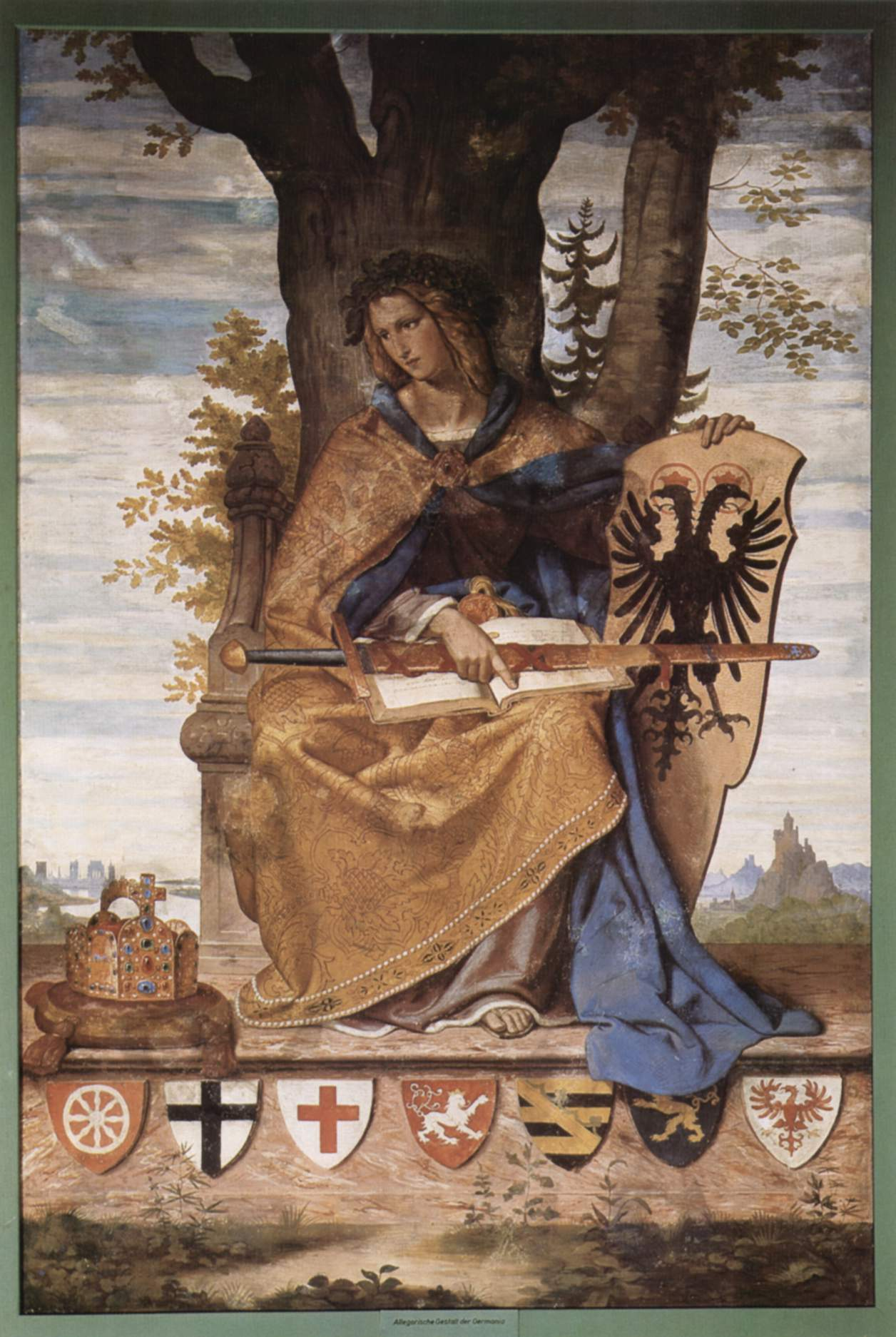
Coats of arms representing the seven original electors with the figure of Germania. Original colours were vivid. Germania's gown was gold, not beige, and the blue-grey was purple. Also, the browns were painted as vivid red and the muted grey in Saxony's arms was a brilliant green.

The German practice of electing monarchs began when ancient Germanic tribes formed ad hoc coalitions and elected the leaders thereof. Elections were irregularly held by the Franks, whose successor states include France and the Holy Roman Empire. The French monarchy eventually became hereditary, but the Holy Roman Emperors remained elective. While all free men originally exercised the right to vote in such elections, suffrage eventually came to be limited to the leading men of the realm. In the election of Lothar III in 1125, a small number of eminent nobles chose the monarch and then submitted him to the remaining magnates for their approbation.

Soon, the right to choose the monarch was settled on an exclusive group of princes, and the procedure of seeking the approval of the remaining nobles was abandoned. The college of electors was mentioned in 1152 and again in 1198. The composition of electors at that time is unclear, but appears to have included bishops and the dukes of the stem duchies.

=== 1257 to Thirty Years' War ===
The electoral college is known to have existed by 1152, but its composition is unknown. A letter written by Pope Urban IV in 1265 suggests that by "immemorial custom", seven princes had the right to elect the King and future Emperor. The pope wrote that the seven electors were those who had just voted in the election of 1257, which resulted in the election of two kings.

- Three ecclesiastical Electors:
  - The Archbishop of Mainz
  - The Archbishop of Trier
  - The Archbishop of Cologne
- Four secular Electors:
  - The King of Bohemia
  - The Count Palatine of the Rhine
  - The Duke of Saxony
  - The Margrave of Brandenburg

The three Archbishops oversaw the most venerable and powerful sees in Germany. After 1214, the Palatinate and Bavaria were held by the same individual, but in 1253, they were divided between two members of the House of Wittelsbach. The other electors refused to allow two princes from the same dynasty to have electoral rights, so a heated rivalry arose between the Count Palatine and the Duke of Bavaria over who should hold the Wittelsbach seat.

Meanwhile, the King of Bohemia, who held the ancient imperial office of Arch-Cupbearer, asserted his right to participate in elections. Sometimes he was challenged on the grounds that his kingdom was not German, though usually he was recognized, instead of Bavaria, which, after all, was just a younger line of Wittelsbachs.

The Declaration of Rhense issued in 1338 had the effect that election by the majority of the electors automatically conferred the royal title and rule over the empire, without papal confirmation. The Golden Bull of 1356 finally resolved the disputes among the electors. Under it, the Archbishops of Mainz, Trier, and Cologne, as well as the King of Bohemia, the Count Palatine of the Rhine, the Duke of Saxony, and the Margrave of Brandenburg held the right to elect the King.

The college's composition remained unchanged until the 17th century, although the office of Prince-elector from Saxony was transferred from the senior (Ernestine) to the junior (Albertine) branch of the Wettin family in 1547, in the aftermath of the Schmalkaldic War.

=== Thirty Years' War to Napoleon ===
In 1623, the Elector Palatine, Frederick V, came under the imperial ban after participating in the Bohemian Revolt (a part of the Thirty Years' War). The Elector Palatine's seat was conferred on the Duke of Bavaria, the head of a junior branch of his family. Originally, the Duke held the electoral dignity personally, but it was later made hereditary along with the duchy. When the Thirty Years' War concluded with the Peace of Westphalia in 1648, a new electoral post was created for the Count Palatine of the Rhine. Since the Elector of Bavaria retained his seat, the number of electors increased to eight; the two Wittelsbach lines were now sufficiently estranged so as not to pose a combined potential threat.

In 1685, the religious composition of the College of Electors was disrupted when a Catholic branch of the Wittelsbach family inherited the Palatinate. A new Protestant electoral post was created in 1692 for the Duke of Brunswick-Lüneburg, who became known as the Elector of Hanover (the Imperial Diet officially confirmed the creation in 1708). The Elector of Saxony converted to Catholicism in 1697 so that he could become King of Poland, but no additional Protestant electors were created. Although the Elector of Saxony was personally Catholic, that electoral post remained officially Protestant, and the Elector even remained the leader of the Protestant body in the Reichstag.

In 1706, the Elector of Bavaria and Archbishop of Cologne were outlawed during the War of the Spanish Succession, but both were restored in 1714 after the Peace of Baden. In 1777, the number of electors was reduced to eight when the Elector Palatine inherited Bavaria.

In 1788, the ruling family of Savoy pushed to receive an electoral title. Their ambition was backed by Brandenburg-Prussia. Nonetheless, the French Revolution and subsequent Coalition Wars soon rendered this a moot point.

Many changes to the composition of the college were necessitated by Napoleon's aggression during the early 19th century. The Treaty of Lunéville (1801), which ceded territory on the Rhine's left bank to France, led to the abolition of the archbishoprics of Trier and Cologne, and the transfer of the remaining spiritual Elector from Mainz to Regensburg. In 1803, new electoral posts were created for the Duke of Württemberg, the Margrave of Baden, the Landgrave of Hesse-Kassel, and the Duke of Salzburg, bringing the total number of electors to ten. When Austria annexed Salzburg under the Treaty of Pressburg (1805), the Duke of Salzburg moved to the Grand Duchy of Würzburg and retained his electoral office. One last push to replace Hanover with the Principality of Brunswick-Wolfenbüttel was made by Prussia during the re-negotiations of the Treaty of Schönbrunn (1805). None of the new electors, however, had an opportunity to cast votes, as the Holy Roman Empire was abolished in 1806, and the new electoral posts were never confirmed by the Emperor.

=== After the Empire ===
After the abolition of the Holy Roman Empire in August 1806, the Electors continued to reign over their territories, many of them taking higher or alternative titles. The Electors of Bavaria, Württemberg, and Saxony styled themselves Kings, while the Electors of Baden, Regensburg, and Würzburg became Grand Dukes. The Elector of Hesse-Kassel, however, retained the meaningless title "Elector of Hesse", thus distinguishing himself from other Hessian princes (the Grand Duke of Hesse(-Darmstadt) and the Landgrave of Hesse-Homburg). Napoleon soon exiled him and Kassel was annexed to the Kingdom of Westphalia, a new creation. The King of Great Britain remained at war with Napoleon and continued to style himself Elector of Hanover, while the Hanoverian government continued to operate in London.

The Congress of Vienna accepted the Electors of Bavaria, Württemberg, and Saxony as Kings, along with the newly created Grand Duke of Baden. The Elector of Hanover finally joined his fellow Electors by declaring himself the King of Hanover. The restored Elector of Hesse tried to be recognized as the King of the Chatti. The European powers refused to acknowledge this title at the Congress of Aix-la-Chapelle (1818), however, and instead listed him with the Grand Dukes as a "Royal Highness". Believing the title of Prince-Elector to be superior in dignity to that of Grand Duke, the Elector of Hesse-Kassel chose to remain an Elector, even though there was no longer a Holy Roman Emperor to elect. Hesse-Kassel remained the only "Electorate" in Germany until 1866, when the country backed the losing side in the Austro-Prussian War and was absorbed into Prussia.

== Marks of office ==
=== Electoral arms ===
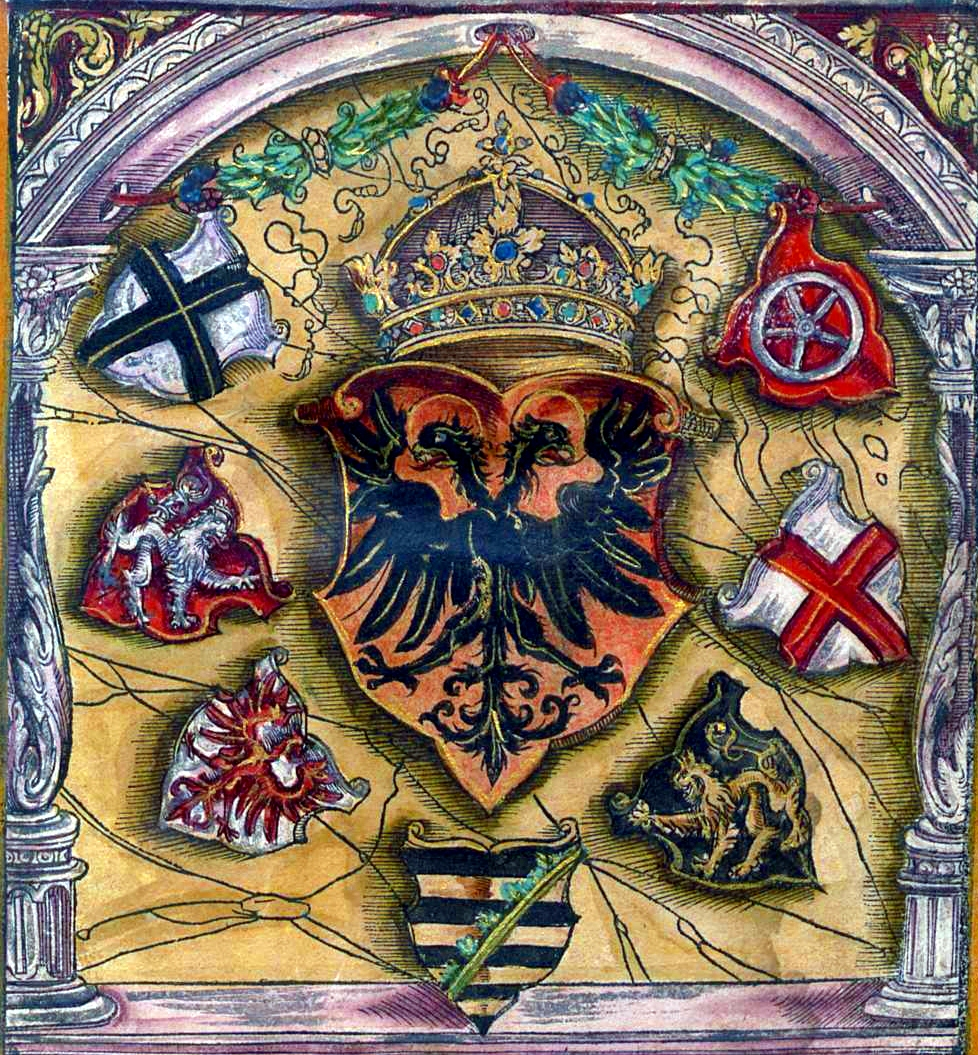
Coats of arms of prince electors surround the Holy Roman Emperor's; from flags book of Jacob Köbel (163#+1545). Left to right: Cologne, Bohemia, Brandenburg, Saxony, the Palatinate, Trier, Mainz.

Below are the State arms of each Imperial Elector. Emblems of Imperial High Offices are shown on the appropriate arms.

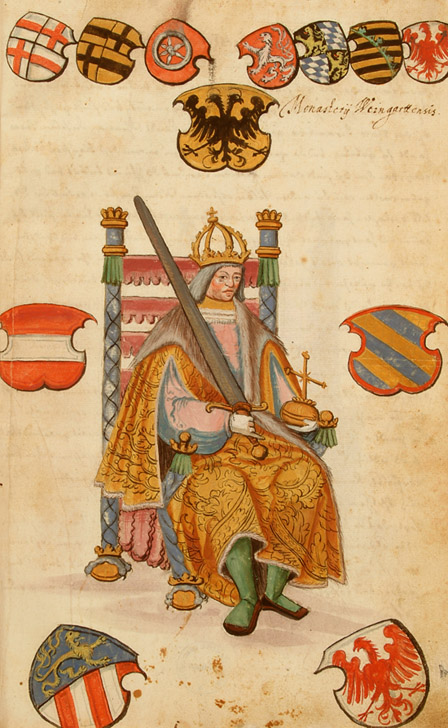
The emperor Maximilian surrounded by shields of princes-electors

Three Electors Spiritual (Archbishops): all three were annexed by various powers through German Mediatisation of 1803.

Mainz

Trier

Cologne

Four Electors Secular:

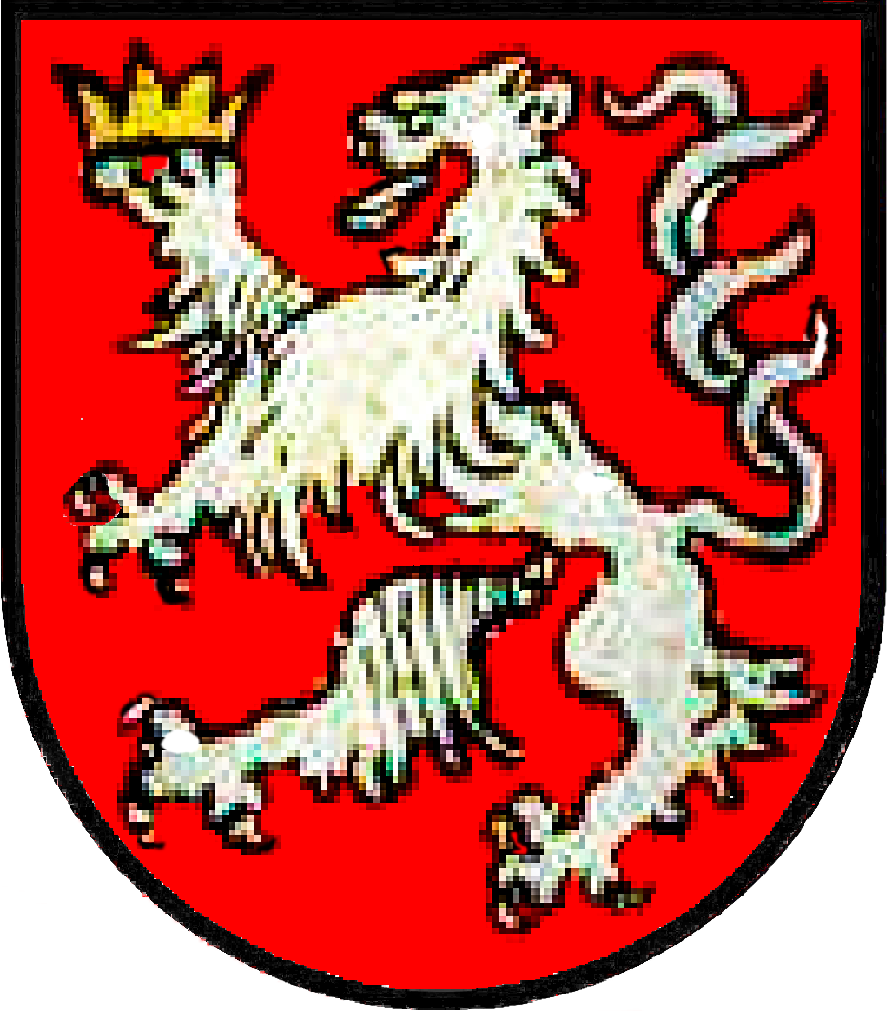
Kingdom of Bohemia. The white lion bears in his right paw a simple crown, the device of the office of Arch Cupbearer. Restored directly from Medieval, hand-drawn armorials.

The Palatinate was an electorate until 1777, when the Elector acceded to Bavaria. The office of Arch-Treasurer transferred to Hanover.

Saxony

Brandenburg

Electors added in the 17th century:

Bavaria was granted electoral dignity by Ferdinand II in 1623, removing the dignity from the Count Palatine of the Rhine.

Hanover (Brunswick-Lüneburg), made an elector by Leopold I in 1692 as a reward for aid given in the War of the Grand Alliance. Later, the ceremonial office of Chief Treasurer was transferred here from the Palatinate.

==== Napoleonic additions ====
As Napoleon waged war on Europe, between 1803 and 1806, the following changes to the Constitution of the Holy Roman Empire were attempted until the Empire's collapse. The arch-chancellor of Germany and archbishop elector of Mainz continued to be an elector, but as the prince of Regensburg, which took over Mainz's arch-episcopal status. The prince of Württemberg received the formerly defunct office of Arch-Bannerbearer, while the other new electors were not given augments or high office in the imperial household, though new offices were planned.

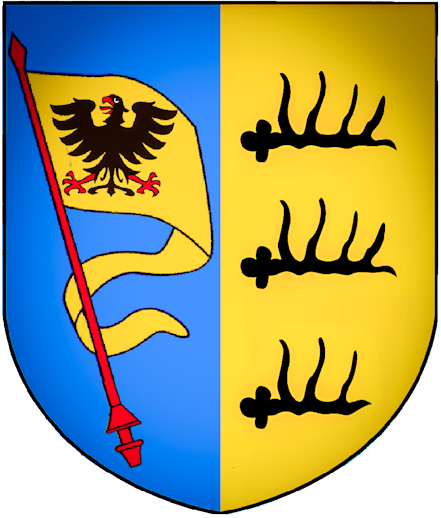
In 1777, the number of Electors dropped from nine to eight, until 1803, when Württemberg was raised to an electorate by the Imperial diet, while the prince himself was elevated from Standard-Bearer (Bannerherr) to Arch-Standardbearer.

Hesse-Cassel was added in 1803.

Principality of Regensburg, ruled by the former prince-archbishop of Mainz, was added in 1803, after the annexation of Mainz by the French.

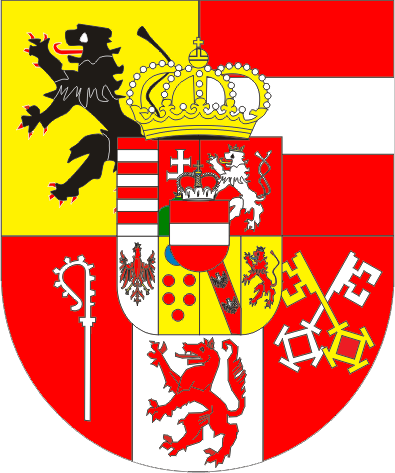
Grand Duchy of Salzburg was added in 1803. After it was mediatized to Austria in 1805, its electoral vote was transferred to Würzburg. Salzburg and Würzburg were ruled by the same person, Ferdinand III.

Duchy of Würzburg was added in 1805.

Margraviate of Baden was added in 1803.

== Timeline of electors ==
	Ecclesiastical elector	Ecclesiastical elector	Ecclesiastical elector	Elector of the Saxons (Note: based on the original stem duchies of the Holy Roman Empire)	Elector of the Swabians	Elector of the Bavarians	Elector of the Franconians	Eighth elector	Ninth elector	Tenth elector
Pre-1059	Prior history of ecclesiastical electors unclear	Prior history of ecclesiastical electors unclear	Prior history of ecclesiastical electors unclear	Duchy of Saxony	Duchy of Swabia	Duchy of Bavaria	Duchy of Franconia	None	None	None
1059–1189	Prior history of ecclesiastical electors unclear	Prior history of ecclesiastical electors unclear	Prior history of ecclesiastical electors unclear	Duchy of Saxony	Duchy of Swabia	Duchy of Bavaria	County Palatine of the Rhine – The Palatinate	None	None	None
1189–1214	Prior history of ecclesiastical electors unclear	Prior history of ecclesiastical electors unclear	Archbishopric of Trier	Duchy of Saxony	Duchy of Swabia	Duchy of Bavaria	County Palatine of the Rhine – The Palatinate	None	None	None
1214–1238	Prior history of ecclesiastical electors unclear	Prior history of ecclesiastical electors unclear	Archbishopric of Trier	Duchy of Saxony	Duchy of Swabia	Kingdom of Bohemia	County Palatine of the Rhine – The Palatinate	None	None	None
1238–1251	Prior history of ecclesiastical electors unclear	Archbishopric of Cologne	Archbishopric of Trier	Duchy of Saxony	Duchy of Swabia	Kingdom of Bohemia	County Palatine of the Rhine – The Palatinate	None	None	None
1251–1257/68	Archbishopric of Mainz	Archbishopric of Cologne	Archbishopric of Trier	Duchy of Saxony	Duchy of Swabia	Kingdom of Bohemia	County Palatine of the Rhine – The Palatinate	None	None	None
1257/68–1296	Archbishopric of Mainz	Archbishopric of Cologne	Archbishopric of Trier	Duchy of Saxony	Margraviate of Brandenburg	Kingdom of Bohemia	County Palatine of the Rhine – The Palatinate	None	None	None
1296–1621	Archbishopric of Mainz	Archbishopric of Cologne	Archbishopric of Trier	Duchy of Saxe-Wittenberg – Electorate of Saxony	Margraviate of Brandenburg	Kingdom of Bohemia	County Palatine of the Rhine – The Palatinate	None	None	None
1621–1623	Archbishopric of Mainz	Archbishopric of Cologne	Archbishopric of Trier	Duchy of Saxe-Wittenberg – Electorate of Saxony	Margraviate of Brandenburg	Kingdom of Bohemia	Imperial ban due to Thirty Years' War	None	None	None
1621–1648	Archbishopric of Mainz	Archbishopric of Cologne	Archbishopric of Trier	Duchy of Saxe-Wittenberg – Electorate of Saxony	Margraviate of Brandenburg	Kingdom of Bohemia	Duchy of Bavaria – Electorate of Bavaria	None	None	None
1648–1692	Archbishopric of Mainz	Archbishopric of Cologne	Archbishopric of Trier	Duchy of Saxe-Wittenberg – Electorate of Saxony	Margraviate of Brandenburg	Kingdom of Bohemia	Duchy of Bavaria – Electorate of Bavaria	County Palatine of the Rhine – The Palatinate	None	None
1692–1706	Archbishopric of Mainz	Archbishopric of Cologne	Archbishopric of Trier	Duchy of Saxe-Wittenberg – Electorate of Saxony	Margraviate of Brandenburg	Kingdom of Bohemia	Duchy of Bavaria – Electorate of Bavaria	County Palatine of the Rhine – The Palatinate	Duchy of Brunswick-Lüneburg – Electorate of Hanover	None
1706–1714	Archbishopric of Mainz	Imperial ban due to War of the Spanish Succession	Archbishopric of Trier	Duchy of Saxe-Wittenberg – Electorate of Saxony	Margraviate of Brandenburg	Kingdom of Bohemia	Imperial ban due to War of the Spanish Succession	County Palatine of the Rhine – The Palatinate	Duchy of Brunswick-Lüneburg – Electorate of Hanover	None
1714–1777	Archbishopric of Mainz	Archbishopric of Cologne	Archbishopric of Trier	Duchy of Saxe-Wittenberg – Electorate of Saxony	Margraviate of Brandenburg	Kingdom of Bohemia	Electorate of Bavaria	County Palatine of the Rhine – The Palatinate	Duchy of Brunswick-Lüneburg – Electorate of Hanover	None
1777–1801	Archbishopric of Mainz	Archbishopric of Cologne	Archbishopric of Trier	Duchy of Saxe-Wittenberg – Electorate of Saxony	Margraviate of Brandenburg	Kingdom of Bohemia	Electorate of Bavaria	None (Merged into Duchy of Bavaria)	Duchy of Brunswick-Lüneburg – Electorate of Hanover	None
Treaty of Lunéville
1801–1803	Archbishopric of Regensburg	None	None	Electorate of Saxony	Margraviate of Brandenburg	Kingdom of Bohemia	Electorate of Bavaria	None	Electorate of Hanover	None
1803–1805	Archbishopric of Regensburg	Landgraviate of Hesse-Kassel – Electorate of Hesse	Margraviate of Baden – Electorate of Baden	Electorate of Saxony	Margraviate of Brandenburg	Kingdom of Bohemia	Electorate of Bavaria	Duchy of Württemberg – Electorate of Württemberg	Electorate of Hanover	Electorate of Salzburg
1805–1806	Archbishopric of Regensburg	Landgraviate of Hesse-Kassel – Electorate of Hesse	Margraviate of Baden – Electorate of Baden	Electorate of Saxony	Margraviate of Brandenburg	Kingdom of Bohemia	Electorate of Bavaria	Duchy of Württemberg – Electorate of Württemberg	Electorate of Hanover	Electorate of Würzburg
Dissolution of the Holy Roman Empire
Congress of Vienna
Successor states	Fully subsumed into Kingdom of Bavaria	Electorate of Hesse	Grand Duchy of Baden	Kingdom of Saxony	Fully subsumed into Kingdom of Prussia	Crown Land of the Austrian Empire	Kingdom of Bavaria	Kingdom of Württemberg	Kingdom of Hanover	Fully subsumed into Kingdom of Bavaria

== See also ==
- Elective monarchy
- Electoral Palace (disambiguation)
- Electress
- Imperial election
