= Coat of arms of Great Britain =

Coat of arms of the monarchy of Great Britain and Great Britain from 1707 to 1800

The Royal Arms of Great Britain from 1714 to 1800, with crest, supporters and motto. The version used in Scotland is shown on the right.

The coat of arms of Great Britain was the coat of arms used by the monarchs (kings and queens) of the Kingdom of Great Britain, which existed from 1707 to 1801. The British kingdom came into being on 1 May 1707, with the political union of the Kingdom of Scotland and the Kingdom of England, which included the nation of Wales, which, at the time, was considered English territory. The Kingdom of Ireland remained separate, but was represented in the British Royal Arms by the harp of Ireland.

On 1 January 1801, the coat of arms was superseded by the coat of arms of the United Kingdom of Great Britain and Ireland, a new kingdom created by the Acts of Union of 1800, which united the kingdoms of Great Britain and Ireland.

== Coats of arms ==
Arms	Dates	Details
	1707–1714	When the Acts of Union 1707 created the Kingdom of Great Britain (1707–1800), the Royal Arms of England and Scotland were impaled and moved to the first and fourth quarters, with the royal arms of France in the second quarter and the harp of Ireland in the third.
	1714–1800	Following the death of Queen Anne, George I, previously Elector of Hanover inherited the throne under the provisions of the Act of Settlement 1701, and as a result the fourth quarter of the arms was changed to represent the new king's titles in Hanover: this quarter marshals Brunswick, Lüneburg and Westphalia, surmounted by the Imperial Crown of the Holy Roman Empire for the Holy Roman office of Archtreasurer.
