= Archbishop's Palace =

Various residences for archbishops are locally known as the Archbishop's Palace, including the following:

- Archbishop's Palace, Perth, Western Australia
- Metropolitan Palace, Lviv, Austria, also known as Archbishop's Palace
- Archbishop's Palace of Salvador, Brazil
- Archbishop's Palace, Zagreb, Croatia
- Archbishop's Palace, Nicosia, Cyprus
- Archbishop's Palace, Prague, Czech Republic, residence of Cardinal Friedrich Prince zu Schwarzenberg
- Kromeriz Archbishop's Palace, Czech Republic
- Archbishop's Palace, Charing, Kent, England
- Archbishop's Palace, Maidstone, Kent, England
- Old Palace, Canterbury, Kent England, also known as Archbishop's Palace
- Otford Palace, also known as Archbishop's Palace, Otford, Kent, England
- Archbishop's Palace, in Worthing, Sussex, England
- Archbishop's Palace, York, England
- Archbishop's Palace, Bishopthorpe, York, England
- Palais Rohan, Bordeaux, France, formerly the Archbishop's Palace
- Archbishop's Palace of Paris, France
- Archiepiscopal Palace, Rouen, France
- Archbishop's Palace, Nicosia, Greece
- Archbishop's Palace (Naples), Italy
- Archbishop's Palace, Vilnius, Lithuania
- Archbishop's Palace, Mdina, Malta
- Archbishop's Palace, Valletta, Malta
- Archbishop's Palace, Armagh, Northern Ireland
- Archbishop's Palace, Trondheim, Norway
- Archbishop's Palace of Lima, Peru
- Palacio Arzobispal, Manila, Philippines
- Archbishop's Palace, Braga, Portugal
- Archbishop's Palace, Constanța, Romania
- Summer Archbishop's Palace, Bratislava, Slovakia
- Archbishop's Palace of Alcalá de Henares, Spain
- Archbishop's Palace, Seville, Spain
- Archbishop's Palace of Toledo, Spain
- Archbishop's Palace, Uppsala, Sweden

== See also ==
- Bishop's Palace (disambiguation)
- Episcopal Palace (disambiguation)
