= Electorate of Württemberg =

State of the Holy Roman Empire (1803–1806)

Electorate of Württemberg Kurfürstentum Württemberg (German)
- 1803–1806
- Coat of arms (1803–1806)

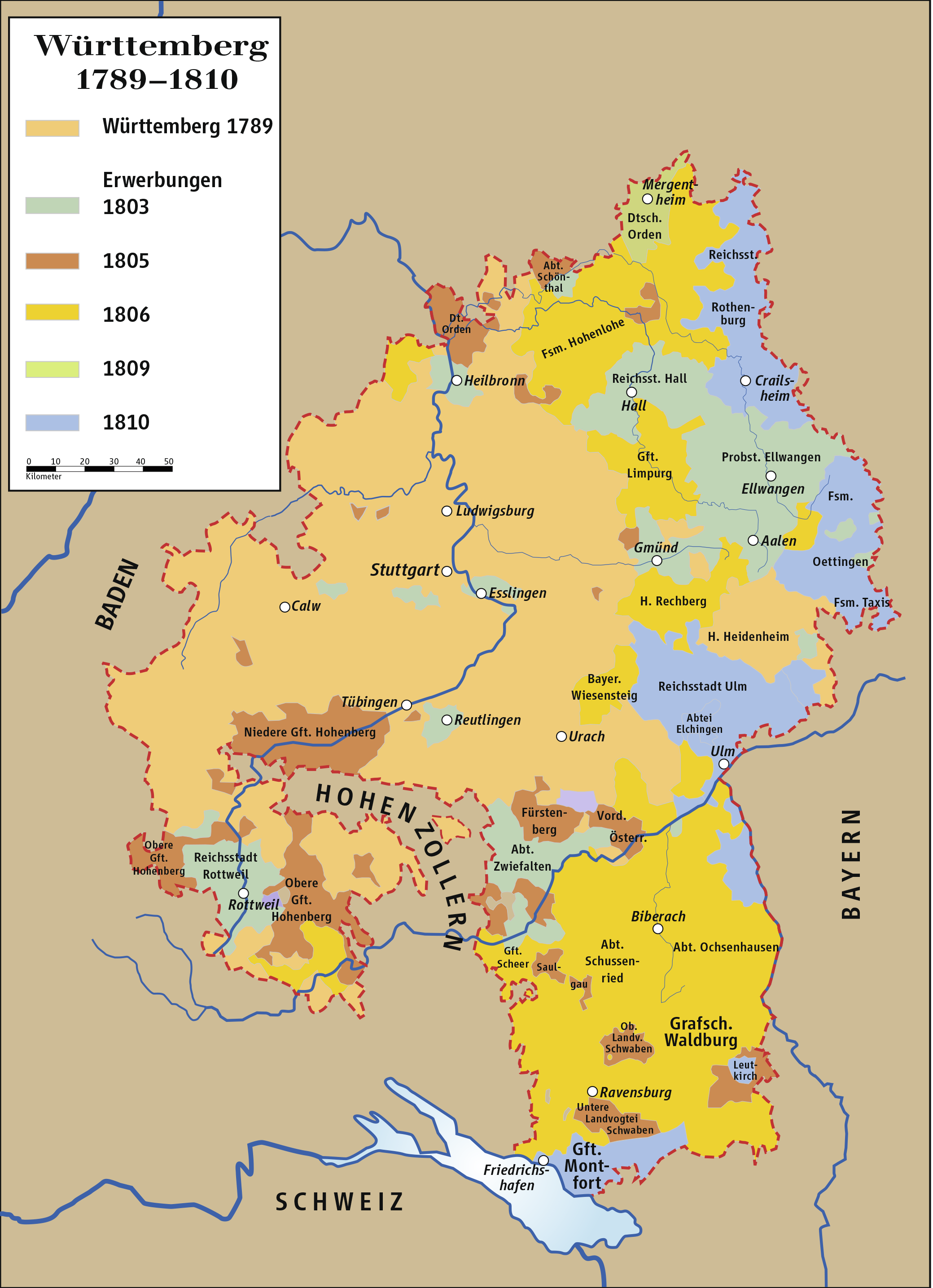
- Territorial development of Württemberg from 1789 to 1810. The original duchy is shown in pale orange, territory gained in 1803 is pale green, and that gained in 1805 is shown in brown. Other territory shown was gained after Württemberg was raised to a kingdom
- Status: Electorate
- Capital: Stuttgart
- Common languages: Swabian German
- Religion: Roman Catholic, Lutheran Protestant
- Demonym: Württemberger
- Elector of Württemberg
  - 1803–1806: Friedrich I, Elector of Württemberg
- Historical era: Modern Ages
  - Raised to Prince-elector: 1803
  - Raised to Kingdom of Württemberg: 1806
| Preceded by | Succeeded by |
| Duchy of Württemberg | Kingdom of Württemberg |
- Today part of: Germany

The Electorate of Württemberg was a short-lived state of the Holy Roman Empire on the right bank of the Rhine. In 1803, the Imperial diet raised the Duchy of Württemberg to an Electorate, the highest form of a princedom in the Holy Roman Empire. However, soon afterward, on 1 January 1806, the last Elector assumed the title of King of Württemberg. Later, the last Emperor, Francis II, abolished de facto the empire on 6 August 1806.

== History ==
Charles Eugene, Duke of Württemberg left no legitimate heirs and was succeeded by his two brothers, first Louis Eugene (died 1795), who was childless, and Frederick II Eugene (died 1797). Frederick II Eugene served in the army of Frederick the Great, to whom he was related by marriage, and then managed his family's estates around Montbéliard. He educated his children in the Protestant faith as francophones, and all members of the subsequent Württemberg royal family were descended from him. Thus, when his son became duke in 1797 as Frederick III, Protestantism returned to the ducal household, and the royal house adhered to this faith thereafter.

During the short reign of Frederick II Eugene, the French Republic invaded Württemberg and compelled the duke to withdraw his troops from the Imperial army and pay reparations. Though he ruled for only two years, Frederick II Eugene effectively managed to retain the independence of the duchy. Through his children's marriages, he made remarkable connections across Europe, including to the Russian, Austrian and British royal families.

His son, Duke Frederick III (1754–1816), was a prince who modelled himself on Frederick the Great. He took part in the War of the Second Coalition against France in defiance of the wishes of his people and, when the French again invaded and devastated the country, he retired to Erlangen, where he remained until after the conclusion of the Treaty of Lunéville on 9 February 1801.

Following the German mediatisation with France, signed in March 1802, he ceded his possessions on the left bank of the Rhine, receiving in return nine free imperial cities, among them Reutlingen and Heilbronn and other territories, amounting altogether to about 850 square miles and containing about 124,000 inhabitants. He also accepted from Napoleon in 1803 the title of elector. Subsequently, the duchy was elevated to an electorate, the Electorate of Württemberg (1803–1805). The new districts were not incorporated in the duchy, but remained separate. They were known as "New Württemberg" and were ruled without a diet. Other areas were acquired in 1803–1806 as part of the German Mediatisation process.

In 1805 Württemberg took up arms on the side of the First French Empire, and in the Peace of Pressburg in December 1805 the elector was rewarded with various parts of Further Austria in the Swabian Circle and with other lands in the area. On 1 January 1806, Duke Frederick III was given the title of King of Württemberg, whereupon he became King Frederick I of Württemberg. King Frederick I abrogated the constitution and united Old and New Württemberg. Subsequently, he placed church property under state control. He also joined the Confederation of the Rhine and received further territory.
