= Episcopal Palace, Siena =

Coordinates: 43.317677°N 11.328383°E

The Palazzo Arcivescovile or Archbishop's Palace of Siena is the official residence of the archbishop and the offices of the Archdiocese of Siena-Colle di Val d'Elsa-Montalcino. The neo-Gothic architecture building is located adjacent to the Cathedral of Siena.

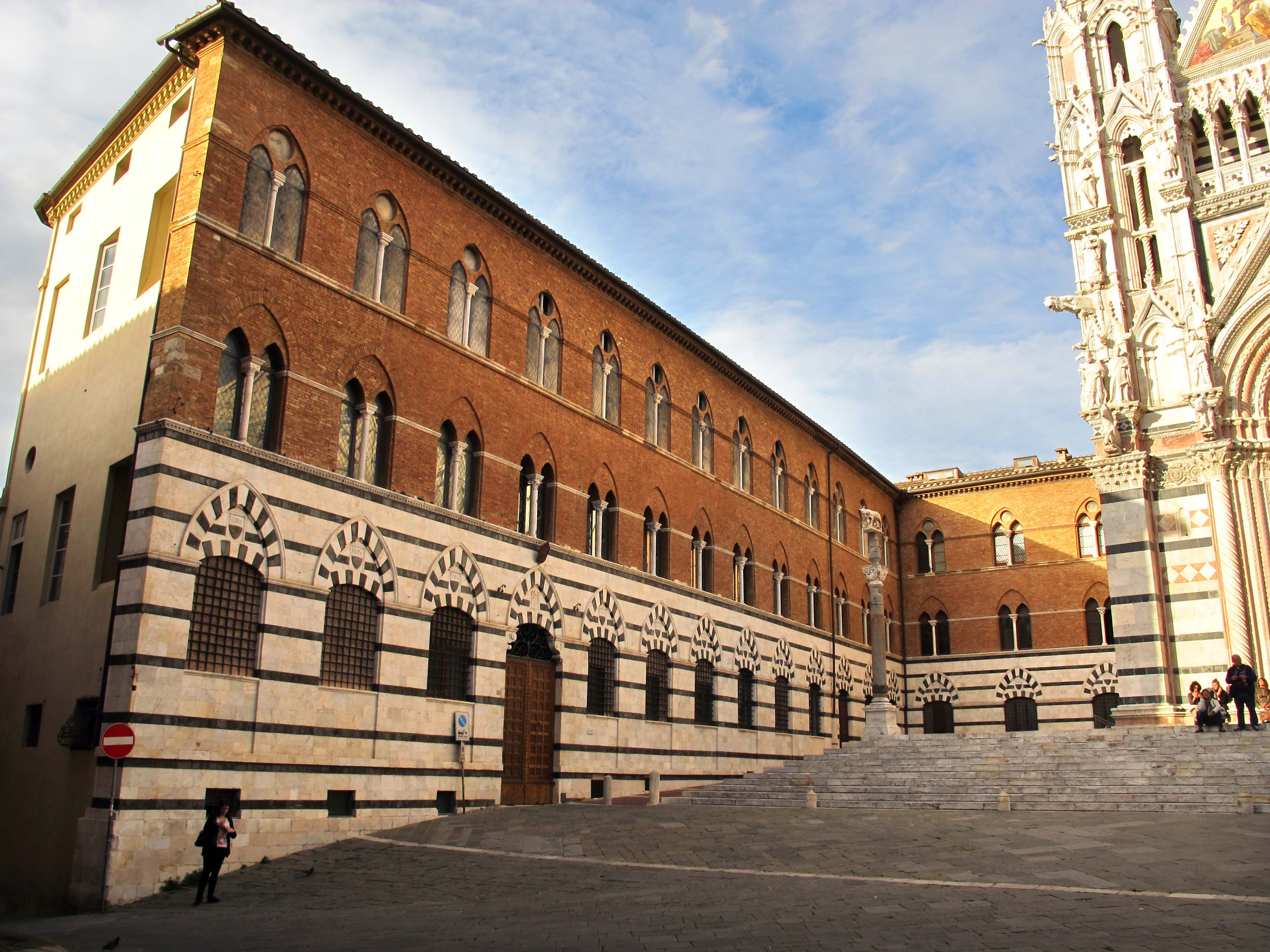
Palazzo Arcivescovile

== History ==
Before 1660, this building to the Northeast flank of the Cathedral entrance housed the canons and the rector or the cathedral, while the bishop lived in a palace at the southwest flank of the church. This building was joined via a loggia to the cathedral.

The site was reconfigured in the mid-17th century, during the reign of the Pope Alexander VII (1655-1667), when the bishop's palaze was razed, and this palace was enlarged and refurbished. Construction persisted for nearly a century. The loggia linking the former palace to the cathedral was built into an adjoining wing. The plans called for the entire three stories, already built on a slope, to be faced with white and black marble, as was completed for the first story (1718-1724) and for the Cathedral. The windows on the second and third floors have characteristic Gothic mullions. The facade windows do not correspond to those on the far side of the building. The portal leads to an atrium with dual ascending staircases. The upstairs rooms have portraits of Sienese bishops and popes.

== Bibliography ==
- Toscana. Guida d'Italia (Guida rossa), Touring Club Italiano, Milano 2003.
