= Archbishop's Palace of Toledo =

Coordinates: 39.8573°N 4.0249°W

The Palacio Arzobispal de Toledo or Archbishop's Palace of Toledo is a palace located in front of the Cathedral and next to the City Hall in the city of Toledo, region of Castile-La Mancha, Spain.

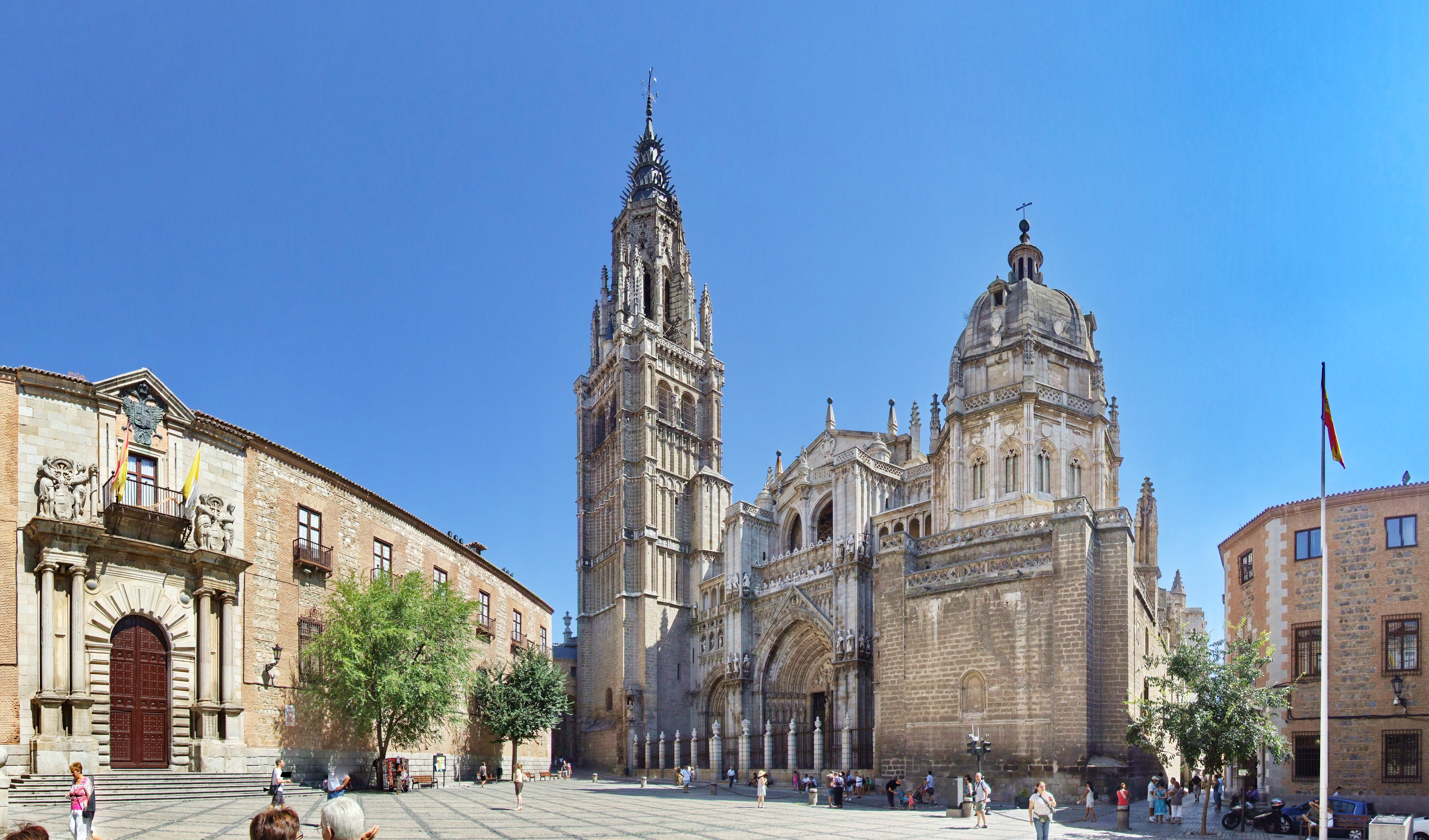
Palace with adjacent cathedral

It was built on land donated to the church by Jose Manuel Thotocopuli, son of El Greco. The palace was constructed over centuries. Cardinal Tavera charged Alonso de Covarrubias with building an arch connecting to the cathedral as well as the main facade. In the 17th century a partial attempt was made to give uniformity to the facade.

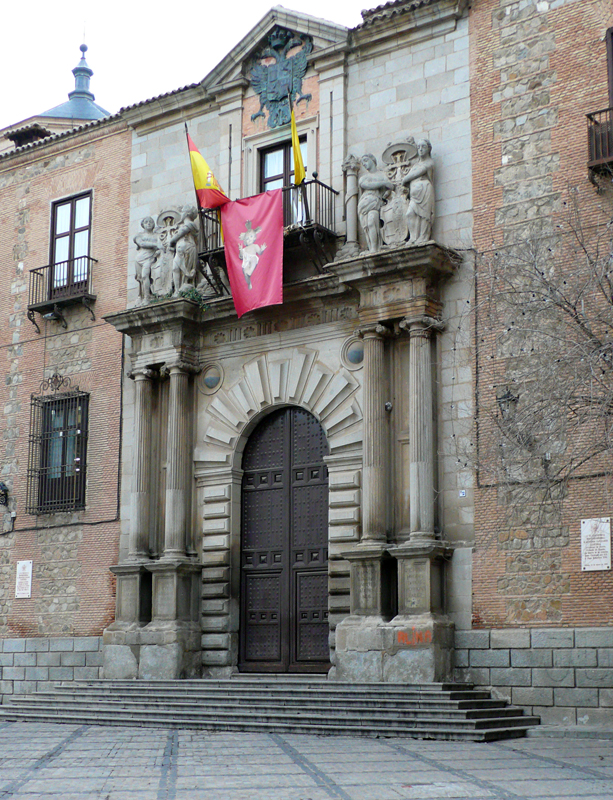
Main portal

Of interest are the portals, including the main one facing to the Plaza del Ayuntamiento. The flanking wings have composite brick and stone, but the center is smooth stone with a triangular tympanum. The small iron upper balcony is flanked with nymphs holding a cardinal's coat of arms. The tympanum is decorated with the Habsburg double eagle, decorated in Mannerist style with coupled columns.

The interior chapel was built in the Baroque style.
