= Arch-Treasurer =

Ceremonial title of the Holy Roman Empire

Arms of the office of Arch-Treasurer of the Holy Roman Empire, showing the imperial crown

Arms of the electorate of Brunswick-Lüneburg, with the Arch-Treasurer's crown at centre.

An Arch-Treasurer (German: Erzschatzmeister, Latin: Archithesaurarius) is a chief treasurer, specifically the great treasurer of the Holy Roman Empire. The title of Arch-Treasurer was only ceremonially significant, as it was only used in the coronation of Emperors.

== History ==
During the 30 Years' War, Frederick V, Elector Palatine, lost his electorate and title of Arch-Steward in February 1623 to Maximilian I, Elector of Bavaria. The electorate and Arch-Stewardship was given to Bavaria by the emperor Ferdinand II. After the war, a new electoral position was given to Frederick's son, Charles, and the office of Arch-Treasurer was created for him in 1652.

In 1706, the Bavarian elector was banned, so the palatine elector returned to the office of Arch-Steward while the office of Arch-Treasurer was transferred to the Elector of Hanover in 1710. The Bavarian elector was reinstated in 1714, so the Bavarian, Palatine and Hanoverian electors' offices changed to Arch-Steward, Arch-Treasurer and Arch-Bannerbearer, respectively, but the House of Hanover kept using the shield of the Arch-treasurership anyway (see Royal coat of arms of Great Britain).

The Hanoverian elector returned to the Arch-Treasurer office in 1777, when the Palatine branch of the House of Wittelsbach inherited Bavaria and the Arch-Steward office. They retained their offices until the end of the empire in 1806.
