= Baroque Palace of Oradea =

Baroque style palace in Oradea / Nagyvárad

Coordinates: 47.068°N 21.93122°E

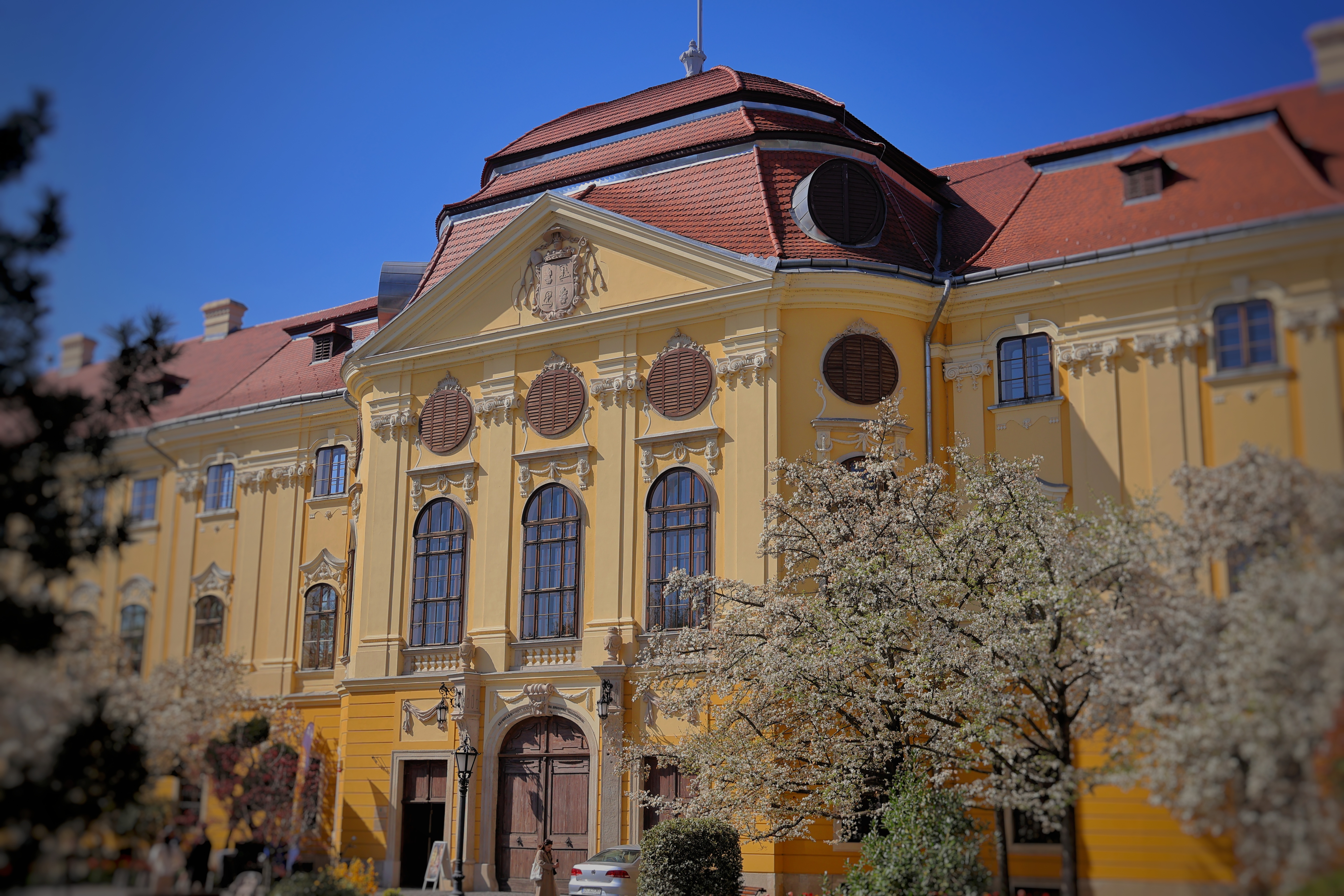
The Baroque Palace of Oradea

The Baroque Palace of Oradea (Romanian: Palatul Baroc din Oradea; Hungarian: Nagyváradi barokk palota), also known as the Roman Catholic Episcopal Palace of Oradea (Romanian: Palatul Episcopiei Romano-Catolice din Oradea; Hungarian: Nagyváradi római katolikus püspöki palota), of the city of Oradea in Bihor County, Romania, is a building that dates to Baroque times.

== History ==
It was founded in 1762 by the Baron Bishop Adam Patačić, as bishopric palace of the Roman Catholic Diocese of Magnovaradimum. Viennese architect Franz Anton Hillebrandt, designer of many Austrian palaces and one of 18th century Europe's best, designed the palace and planned the city's posh side as Baroque quarter, while engineer A.J. Neumann was in charge of the massive palace's construction, complete with its 365 exterior windows resembling the days of the year and 120 large, extravagant rooms distributed on three floor plans.

Construction on the building lasted from 1762 to 1777.

The architecture of the palace is of late Austrian Baroque style, a more sober and practical type compared to the highly ornamented French Baroque, for example. The building was meant to resemble on a smaller scale the famous Royal Belvedere (palace) of Vienna, which likely was one of the reasons along with other religious conflicts that made Empress Maria Theresa of Austria repudiate the founder, Adam Patachich, a Croatian nobleman and the bishop of Oradea between 1759 and 1776; he was then sent to another diocese, in Kalocsa, Hungary.

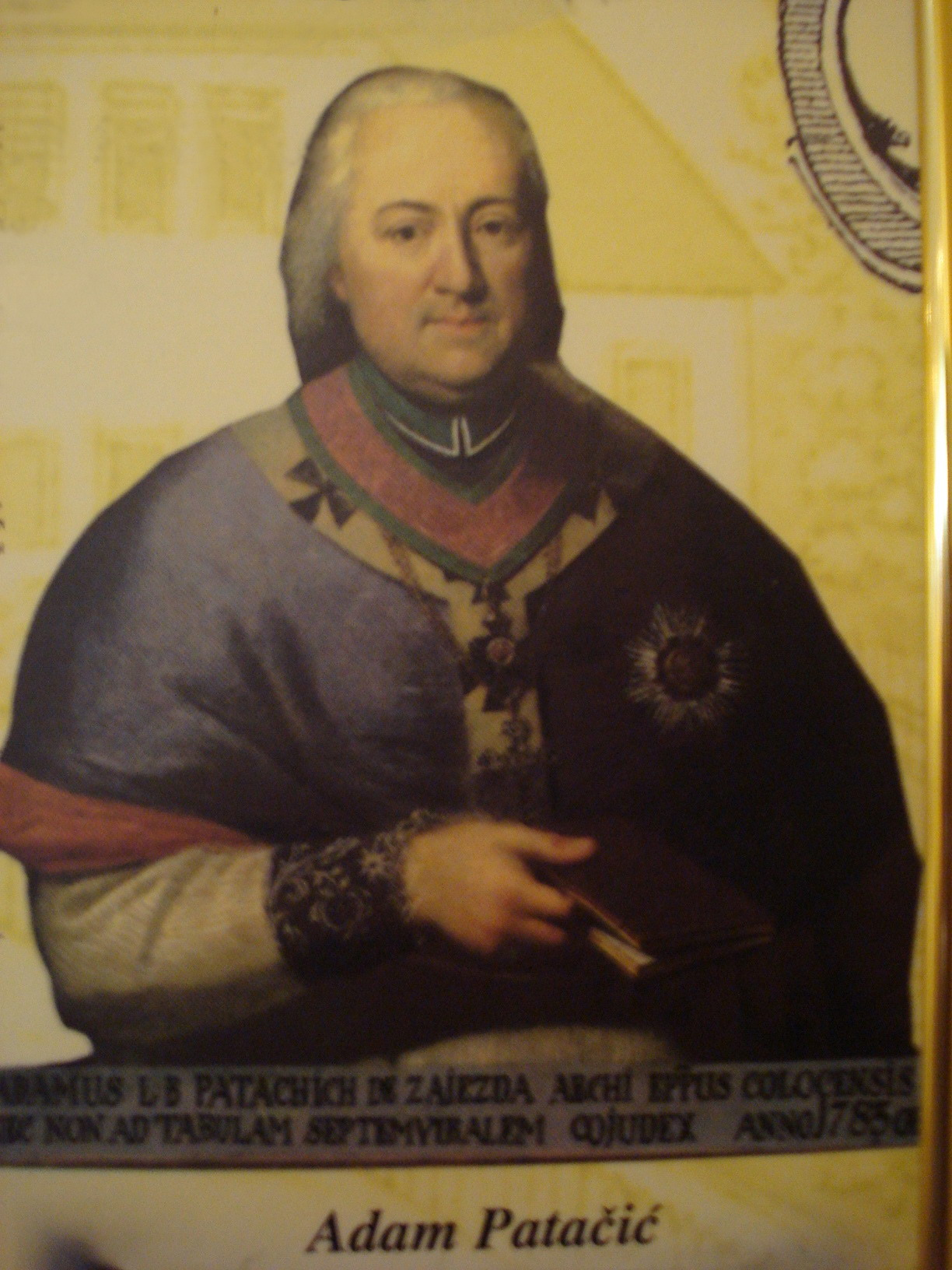
Adam Patachich (Croatian: Patačić), the founder of the palace

Nevertheless, the baron was a charismatic, highly educated humanist and an illuminated patron of arts, who is mostly remembered for the fine music and musicians he surrounded himself with. This is where Michael Haydn, famous composer and Joseph Haydn's brother, worked as a Kapellmeister in the bishop's orchestra. The bishop also employed at the court other famous European composers and violinists like Wenzel Pichl and Carl Ditters von Dittersdorf, who between 1765 and 1769 served as a Musikdirektor.

Finally, in 1771, the Holy Roman Empress (jure uxori), Maria Theresa of Austria, together her son, future Joseph II, Holy Roman Emperor, arrived here to visit and make peace with project she did not initially fancy. In 1773 the palace unfortunately burned down entirely in a mysterious fire, but was reconstructed immediately by the next appointed bishop, after its original plans.

In the year 1855, a new side and entrance were added, faithful in tone to the initial building, with grand double stairways. Later, after Romania gained possession of Transylvania, it remained under the church's patronage but during the socialist regime it was seized as state property.

On January 17, 1971, the Baroque Palace became a county museum hosting many large archeological, historical, natural history, ethnographic and art collections under the name of "Muzeul Ţării Crişurilor" ("Museum of the Three Rivers Land"). The museum has approximately 450,000 pieces divided under four main collections: History and Archeology, Ethnography, Art and Natural History. Famous for its world-class Neolithic and Bronze Age collection, the museum also boasts treasures from Ancient Egypt and Greece. The ethnography section has probably the largest of western Transylvanian folk exhibits anywhere, including a large selection of traditional costumes, peasant house appliances, pottery and painted Easter eggs.

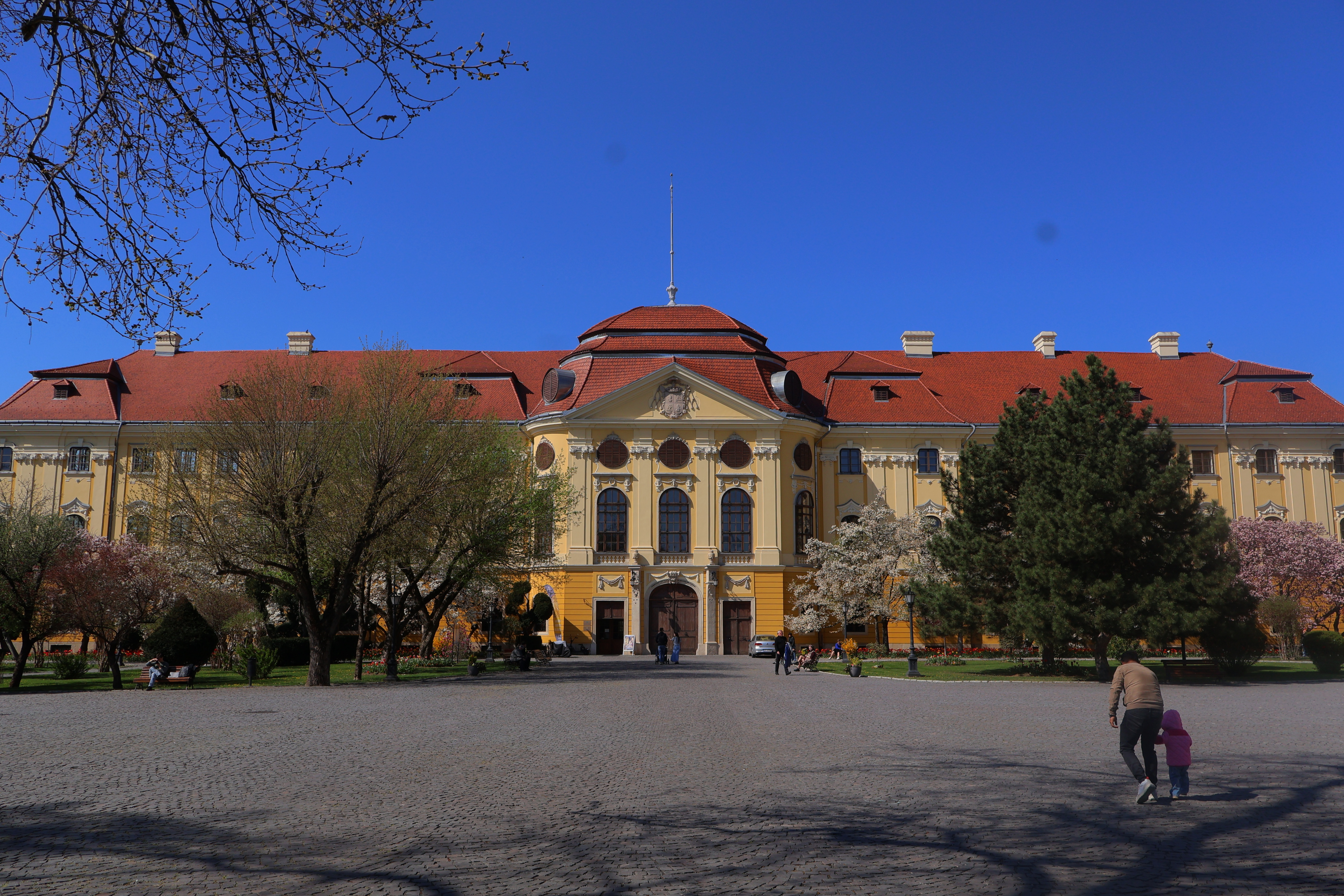

The highlights of the Natural History section are the prehistoric animals including cave bears, giant elk, different mammoth types or dinosaurs (like Iguanodons, Valdosaurus or Camptosaurus). The interior courtyard is dotted by a long row of Romanian monarch busts added during the museum years.

The front courtyard is an artistic park with large old bronze and marble statues of historical figures and also home to a famous Baroque parish church erected in 1752 even before the palace, a work of the Italian architect Giovanni Battista Ricca modeled after the mother church of the Jesuits, Church of the Gesu in Rome. The basilica contains the relics of King Saint Ladislaus, born in the year 1040, a splint of his skull being kept here in a gold box. In 1992, Pope John Paul II through the Holy See's decree, raised the church to a holy basilica rank.

In 2003, like many other edifices, The Baroque Palace of Oradea was restored to the Roman Catholic Diocese of Oradea Mare by the Government of Romania, but the building is still being used as a museum until further negotiations are made.

== See also ==
- List of castles in Romania
- Tourism in Romania
