= Bishop's Palace =

A bishop's palace is a type official residence of any bishop, such as those listed in the Category:Episcopal palaces.

Specific residences called Bishop's Palace include:

== Poland ==
- Palace of the Kraków Bishops in Kielce, Poland
- Bishop's Palace, Kraków, Poland

== United Kingdom ==
=== England ===
- Bishop's Palace, Auckland, County Durham
- Bishop's Waltham Palace, Hampshire
- Bishop's Palace, Bromley, Kent
- Old Bishop's Palace, Chester, Cheshire
- Lambeth Palace, London
- Bishop's Palace, Lichfield, Staffordshire
- Lincoln Medieval Bishop's Palace, Lincolnshire
- Sonning Bishop's Palace, Berkshire
- Bishop's Palace, Wells, Somerset
- Bishopthorpe Palace, North Yorkshire
- The Old Palace, Worcester, Worcestershire
- Bishop's Court, Devon

=== Scotland ===
- Bishop's Palace, Kirkwall, Orkney

=== Wales ===
- Lamphey Bishop's Palace, Pembrokeshire
- Bishop's Palace, Llandaff, Cardiff
- Mathern Palace, Monmouthshire
- St Davids Bishops Palace, Pembrokeshire

== Other places ==
- Prince-Bishops' Palace (Liège), Belgium
- Kroměříž Bishop's Palace, Czech Republic
- Bishop's Palace, Castres, France
- Würzburg Residence, of the Prince-Bishop of Würzburg, Germany
- Bishop's Palace, Birgu, Malta
- Bishop's Palace, Mdina, Malta
- Bishop's Palace, Valletta, Malta
- Bishop's Palace of Astorga, Spain
- Old Bishop's Palace in Oslo, Norway
- Bishop's Palace, Galveston, Texas, United States

== See also ==
- Archbishop's Palace (disambiguation)
- Episcopal Palace (disambiguation)
- Electoral Palace (disambiguation)
