= Passenger terminal =

Passenger terminal may refer to:

- A train station terminus at the end of a railway line
- Airport terminal, a building at an airport where passengers board and disembark from aircraft
- A bus station
- Passenger terminal (maritime), a building in a port or on a dock where passengers board and disembark from passenger ships such as cruise ships and ferries

== See also ==
- Landing (water transport)
