= Electoral Palace =

Electoral Palace or Elector's Palace may refer to any of the palaces of one of the German Holy Roman Empire's Prince-electors:

- Electoral Palace, Amberg, of the Elector of the Palatinate at Amberg
- Electoral Palace, Bonn, of the Archbishops and Electors of Cologne at Bonn
- Electoral Palace, Koblenz, of the last Archbishop and Elector of Trier at Koblenz
- Electoral Palace, Mainz, of the Archbishops and Electors of Mainz
- Heidelberg Castle, the ruined Electoral Palace of the Electors Palatine of the Rhine at Heidelberg
- Mannheim Palace, the main residence of the Electors Palatine of the Rhine at Mannheim
- Schloss Johannisburg, an Electoral Palace of the Archbishops and Electors of Mainz at Aschaffenburg

== See also ==
- Bishop's Palace (disambiguation)
- List of castles in Germany
