= Episcopium =

Palace of a bishop

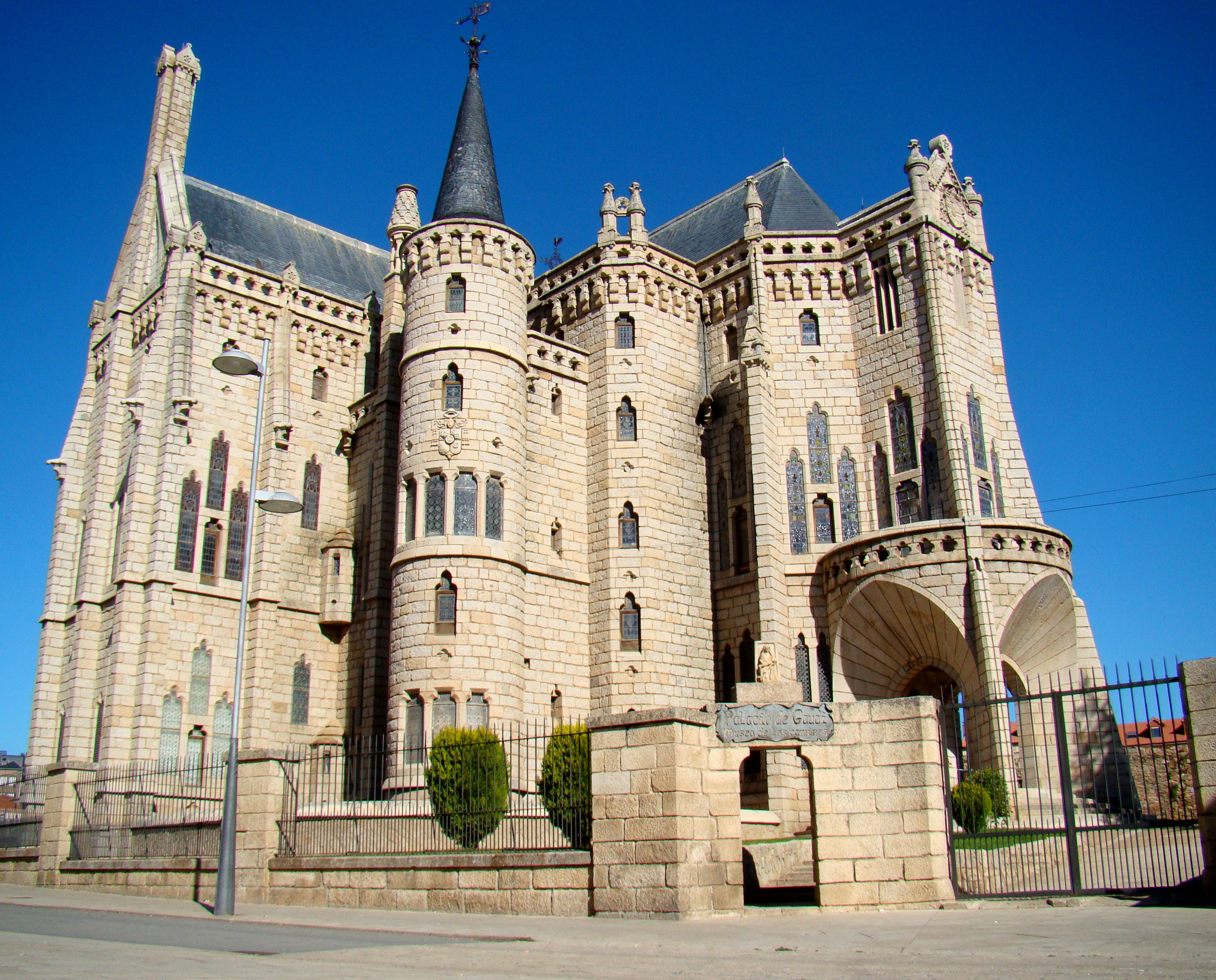
Palacio Episcopal in Astorga, Spain

An episcopium (Latin for an episcopal palace) is an ecclesiastical figure and their administration. The episcopium emphasizes "an essential unity between his [the bishop's] person, power and place." In medieval Italy episcopia were frequently part of a complex connected to the baptistery and cathedral.

In Rome, the Basilica of St. John Lateran housed the Lateran Palace. This was the principal episcopium of medieval Rome, although Pope John VII (705–707) built an episcopium upon the Palatine Hill.
