= Jan Chryzostom Piłsudski =

Lithuania landowner and Chamberlain

Jan Chrzostom Piłsudski
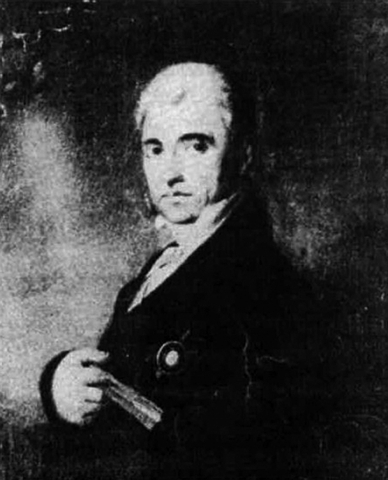

Chamberlain of the Duchy of Samogitia, Marshal of the Nobility for the District of Telšiai, member of The Great Sejm and Sub-prefect of Telšiai District

Personal details
- Born: 1760 Pajūralis, Lithuania
- Died: April 18, 1837 (aged 76–77) Čiobiškis Manor, Lithuania

Jan Chryzostom Piłsudski (1760–1837) (Piłsudski coat of arms), was a Lithuania nobleman and landowner, Chamberlain of the Duchy of Samogitia, Marshal of the Nobility for the District of Telšiai, member of The Great Sejm, sub-prefect of the Provisional Government of Lithuania for the area of Telšiai and ancestor of Romanas Chodakauskas, Sofija Smetonienė, Tadas Chodakauskas and Jadvyga Tūbelienė.

== Biography ==
Jan Chryzostom Piłsudski was born in Pajūralis Manor 1760.

His father was Franciszek Piłsudski (1713–1791), Podczaszy (Deputy Cup Bearer), member of Parliament in 1758 and receiver of the Order of Saint Stanislaus (1779) and the Great Cross of Divine Providence. In 1764, he supported the election of Stanisław August Poniatowski as a member of the nobility from the Duchy of Samogitia. Franciszek Piłsudski was a member of the nobility from the Duchy of Samogitia to the Czaplica Sejm in 1766.

Franciszek bought Šilalė Estate (from his brother), Aukštieji Gelgaudiškiai (the holding bordering to the east of Gelgaudiškis Manor), Putvinskiai Manor (24 km north-east of Šilalė) and several other estates, thus greatly expanding the family's holdings. By 1790 Franciszek Piłsudski ruled Šilalė, Viešvėnai (50 km north of Šilalė), and Laukuva (16 km north of Šilalė). He owned four districts, seven manor houses, forty-one villages and two minor noblemen.

In 1769–1779 he had the Šilalė church built (which has since been replaced).

When Franciszek died in 1791, his son Jan inherited Pajūralis Estate, Šilalė Estate and others.

Jan was Chamberlain of the Duchy of Samogitia (probably under Michał Giełgud (1795–1808)), Marshal of the Nobility for the District of Telšiai, member of The Great Sejm and receiver of the Order of St Stanislas.

In 1812, Jan Piłsudski was appointed Sub-prefect of the Provisional Government of Lithuania for the area of Telšiai by Napoléon Bonaparte. The appointment lasted less than a year as Napoléon and his Grande Armée were driven out of Russia and Lithuania before the end of 1812.

Jan died on April 18, 1837, at Čiobiškis Manor.

== Marriages and family ==
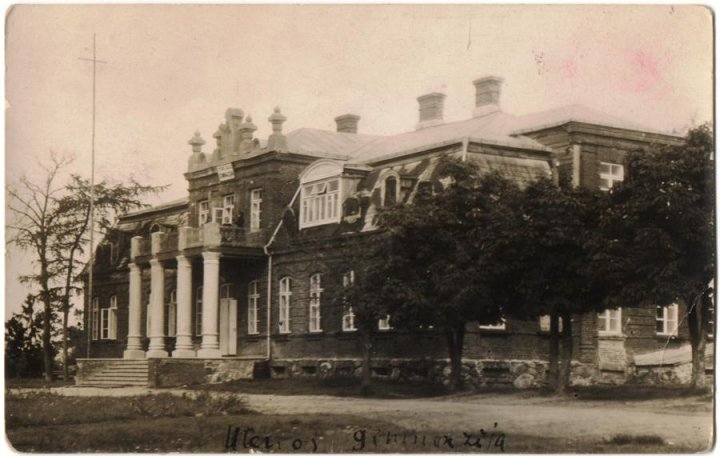
Utena Manor

Jan married Helena Strutyńska (born c. 1760) from Utena Manor. Jan and Helena had two sons: Franciszek Piłsudski (born c. 1790) and Ildefons Reginald Jan Nepomuk Piłsudski (1792–1811).

Helena died and Jan married Helena’s sister Bogumila Strutyńska (c. 1772 – 1832), who was taken from the Antalieptės Monastery of the Holy Cross (established by the Strutyński family in 1734) to marry him.

Jan and Bogumila had three children: Katarzyna Kociełłowa (née Piłsudska) (born c. 1793), Stanisław Piłsudski (1795–1862) and Marcjancella Piłsudski (later Chodakowski) (born c. 1797), all born in Utena Manor. Jan and Bogumila later divorced.

Jan married Antonina Bortkiewicz in 1822. There were no children with this subsequent marriage.

Jan's daughter, Marcjancella (born c. 1797), married the lancer Antoni Chodakowski (1784–1831). When they and their two sons, Kazimierz (1814–1905; father of Antoni Chodakowski and grandfather of Romanas Chodakauskas, Sofija Smetonienė, Tadas Chodakauskas and Jadvyga Tūbelienė) and Aleksander (c. 1815 – 1871) returned from France c. 1817 after the Battle of Waterloo, the family moved into Čiobiškis with Jan. They stayed in Čiobiškis while Marcjancella had three more children: Teofilia (born 1819), Antonin (born 1821) and Carol (born 1823).

== Manors ==
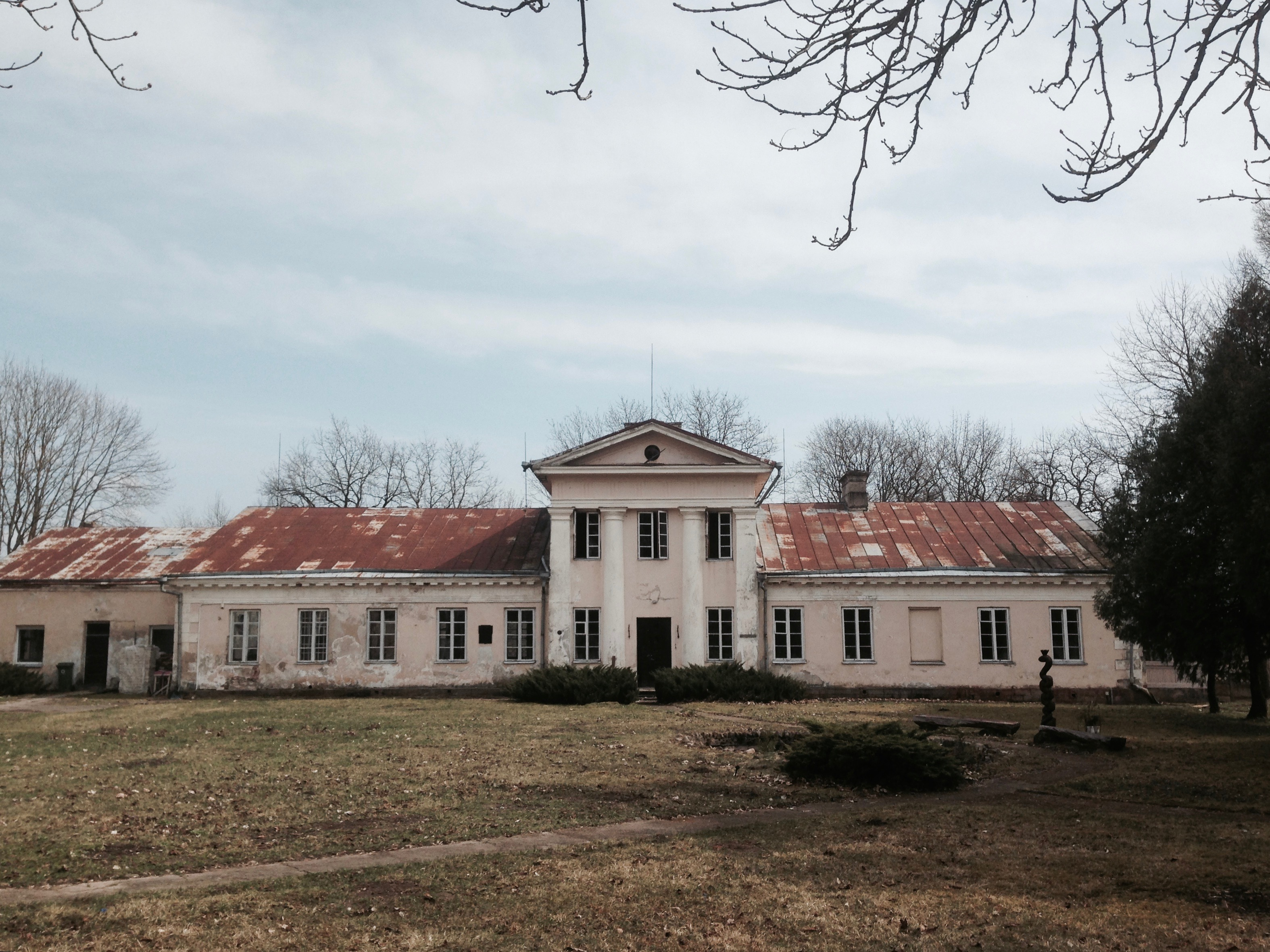
Čiobiškis Manor

Jan Chryzostom Piłsudski owned Pajūralis, Šilalė, Čiobiškis Aukštieji Gelgaudiškiai, Laukuva and other manors.

When Jan left the Šilalė area he sold Aukštieji Gelgaudiškiai and Laukuva.

On April 26, 1815, Jan Chrysostom Piłsudski bought Čiobiškis Manor from Gansecki and Schwykowski for 110,000 rubles. He had the Church of St. John the Baptist in Čiobiškis built.

Both Šilalė and Čiobiškis were inherited not by Jan’s son Stanisław, but by his grandson Stefan Piłsudski (1823–1864).

When Stefan died, Šilalė Estate went to Stefan’s daughter Stefanija Piłsudska (c. 1849 – 1920), who sold it in 1889. In total Šilalė Estate was in the Piłsudski family for 177 years. Čiobiškis was probably passed down to Stefan’s son, Konstantin Aleksander Piłsudski (1862–1903).

Jan left Pajūralis Manor to his son Stanisław (1795–1862). As far as is known, nothing was left to Marcjancella or the other Piłsudski children.
