= Piłsudski (disambiguation) =

Józef Piłsudski (1867–1935) was a Polish politician, military leader, marshal and Chief of State.

Pilsudski or Piłsudski may also refer to:

- Piłsudski (surname)
- Piłsudski family, family of nobility
- MS Piłsudski, Polish passenger ship
- SS Josef Pilsudski, Polish passenger ship
- ORP Komendant Piłsudski, Polish gunboat
- Pilsudski (horse), thoroughbred racehorse
- Piłsudski coat of arms
- Piłsudski's Mound, mound located in Kraków, Poland
- Piłsudski Square, square located in Warsaw, Poland
- Piłsudski (film), 2019 polish film

== See also ==
- Piłsudskiite (Piłsudczyk), supporter of Józef Piłsudski
