= Piłsudski (surname) =

Piłsudski (feminine: Piłsudska, plural: Piłsudscy) is a Polish surname. Notable people with the surname include:

- Adam Piłsudski (1869–1935), Polish politician
- Aleksandra Piłsudska (1882–1963), Polish socialist and independence activist
- Bronisław Piłsudski (1866–1918) Polish ethnographer
- Jadwiga Piłsudska (1920–2014), Polish pilot
- Jan Piłsudski (1876–1950), Polish politician, lawyer
- Józef Piłsudski (1867–1935), Polish politician, military leader, marshal and Chief of State
- Maria Piłsudska (1865–1921), Polish socialist and independence activist
- Wanda Piłsudska (1918–2001), Polish psychiatrist
