= Ferdynand Ignacy Piłsudski =

Lithuanian nobleman (c. 1670 - c. 1719)

- Pan
- Known for: Colonel and Commander in the Samogitian division of the Grand Duchy of Lithuania
- Born: c. 1670; Pajūralis, Lithuania
- Died: c. 1719 (aged 48–49); Šilalė
- Noble family: Piłsudski
- Spouse: Ludwika Urszula Billewicz

Ferdynand Ignacy Piłsudski (c. 1670 – c. 1719) Piłsudski coat of arms, was a Lithuanian nobleman, a colonel and commander of the Samogitian Division in the army of the Grand Duchy of Lithuania.

== Biography ==
Ferdynand Ignacy Piłsudski was born in Pajūralis Manor in c. 1670 to Jan Kazimierz Piłsudski and Ewa Piłsudska (née Prejkint).

The family was Polonized Lithuanian nobility that over time became part of the Polish nobility (szlachta); it has been called either a Polish noble family or a Polish-Lithuanian noble family.

Ferdynand was the brother of:

1. Konstancja Piłsudska (m. Jerzy Górski)
2. Dominik Piłsudski (m. N.N. Stęgwiłł)
3. Norbert Piłsudski (m. N.N. Grotus)
4. Roch Mikołaj Piłsudski (b.c1680) - Stolnik of Vawkavysk. Roch's marriage to Magłorzata Pancerzyńska - whose brother, Karol Piotr Pancerzyński (died 1729), was Bishop of Vilnius - raised the wealth and prestige of the Piłsudski family.
5. Mikołaj Piłsudski
6. Reinhold Michał Piłsudski (m. Teresa Kisarzewska)
7. Joanna Petruszewiczowa
8. Emerencjanna Jucewiczowa
9. Eufrozyna Anreppa
10. Anna Katarzyna Piłsudska

Ferdynand Piłsudski became a Colonel and Commander of the Samogitian Division in the Grand Ducal Lithuanian Army.

In the Warsaw Confederation (1704) Ferdinand was a supporter of Stanisław Leszczyński and opponent of Augustus II of Saxony.

Ferdinand died c. 1719 in Šilalė, Lithuania.

== Marriage and children ==
Ferdynand Ignacy Piłsudski married Ludwika Urszula Billewicz, and they had five children:

1. Franciszek Piłsudski (1713-1791)
2. Jan Piłsudski
3. Ludwik Piłsudski (m. Marianna Kołłątaj)
4. Aleksander Piłsudski
5. Antoni Piłsudski

== Manors ==
Ferdynand inherited Pajūralis Manor and bought Šilalė Manor from Jurgis Valavičius in 1712. Another part of Šilalė estate was given to Ferdinand by his sister, Emerencjanna. In addition, Ferdinand owned a number of estates in the Ländai and Telšiai districts.

Šilalė Manor was inherited by Ferdynand's son Ludwik Piłsudski. He in turn sold the estate to his brother, Franciszek Piłsudski.
