= Gelgaudiškis =

- Town
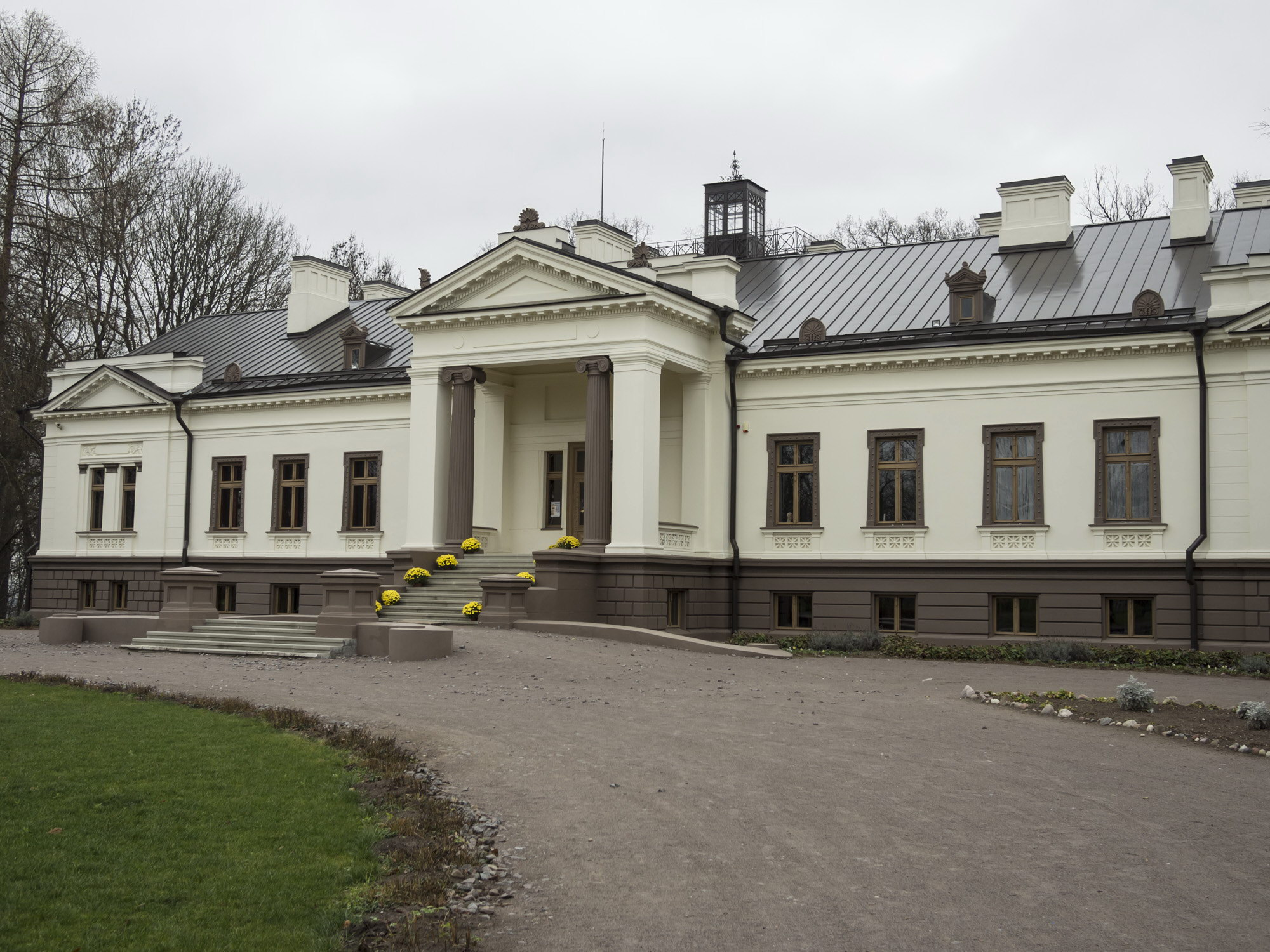
- Gelgaudiškis Manor

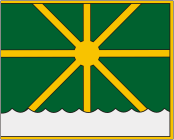
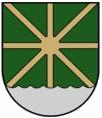
- Flag Coat of arms

- Location of Gelgaudiškis
- Coordinates: 55°5′0″N 22°59′0″E
- Country: Lithuania
- Ethnographic region: Sudovia
- County: Marijampolė County
- Municipality: Šakiai district municipality
- Eldership: Gelgaudiškis eldership
- Capital of: Gelgaudiškis eldership
- First mentioned: 15th century
- Granted city rights: 1958

Area
  - Total: 3.37 km^{2} (1.30 sq mi)
- Elevation: 51 m (167 ft)

Population (2021)
  - Total: 1,557
  - Density: 462/km^{2} (1,200/sq mi)
- Time zone: UTC+2 (EET)
  - Summer (DST): UTC+3 (EEST)
- Postal code: LT-71085
- Area code: (+370) 345
- Website: gelgaudiskis.lt

Gelgaudiškis is a town in the Šakiai district municipality, Lithuania. It is located 15 km (9.3 mi) north of Šakiai. The town is just south of Neman River.

== Name ==
Gelgaudiškis is the Lithuanian name of the town. Versions of the name in other languages include Polish: Giełgudyszki, Russian: Гельгудишки Gel'gudishki, Belarusian: Гельгудiшкi Gel'hudishki, Yiddish: געלגודישק Gelgudishk.

== History ==
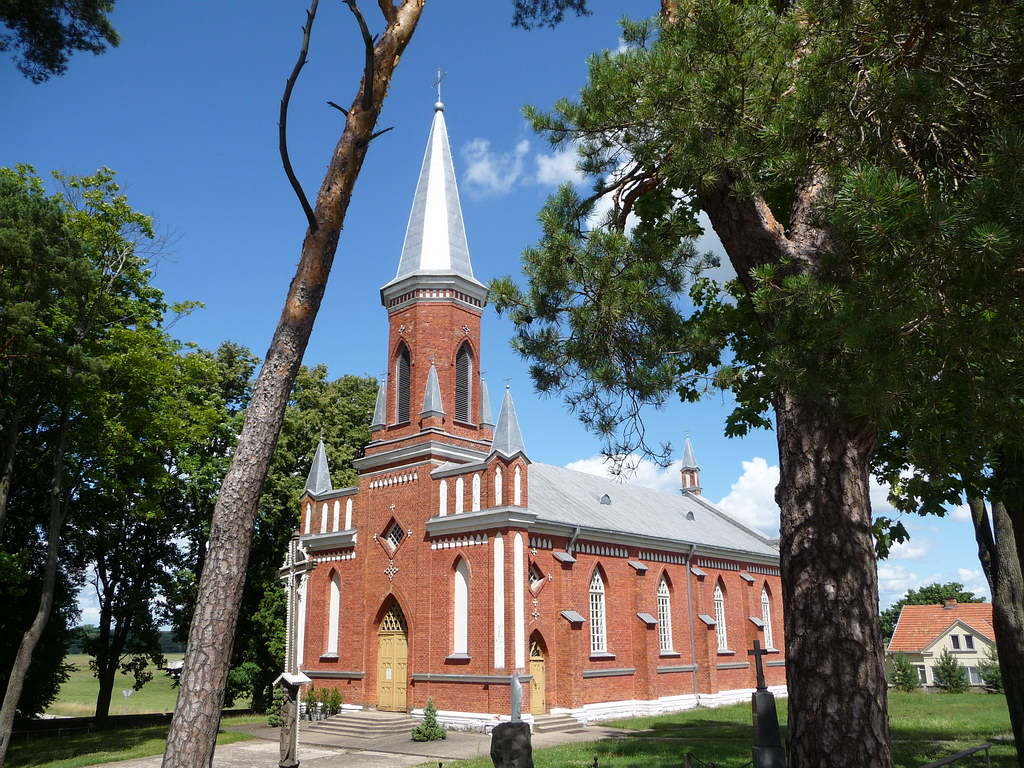
Church of the Exaltation of the Holy Cross

Before the end of the 14th century the area of Gelgaudiškis settlement and manor, positioned on the upper bank of Neman, belonged to the Grand Dukes of the Grand Duchy of Lithuania. In 1504, King and Grand Duke Aleksander Jagiellon gave it away as a gift to his royal secretary Sapieżyc, progenitor to the szlachta family of Sapieha. Afterwards, the grange belonged to families of Massalski, Dembiński, Oziembłowski, Giełgud, Czartoryski, the Prussian barons Von Keudell, and finally Komar family (till the beginning of World War I).

The classicist palace was built in the first half of the 19th century by the family of von Keudell. In the interwar period, the establishment was nationalized and housed an orphanage and later a school. After the fire of 1979 the palace was rebuilt and since remains unoccupied. It is surrounded by a garden and forested park with an area of 112 ha leading to Neman (Lithuanian: Nemunas) River.

The town and nearby castle is mentioned in John Gielgud: The Authorized Biography, (by Sheridan Morley), as being the actor's ancestral home and from where his family name originated.

During World War I, it was occupied by Germany. During World War II, it was occupied by the Soviet Union from 1940, by Nazi Germany from 1941, and then once again by the Soviet Union from 1944.

== River port ==
A small cargo pier was established on Nemunas in 1973 to export produce from the gravel quarry. Today it used for water tourism and recreation as the territory falls within Panemunai Regional Park. A memorundam of developing it further for industrial cargo was signed with the Port of Klaipėda authority in March 2026.
