= Griškabūdis Eldership =

Eldership of Lithuania

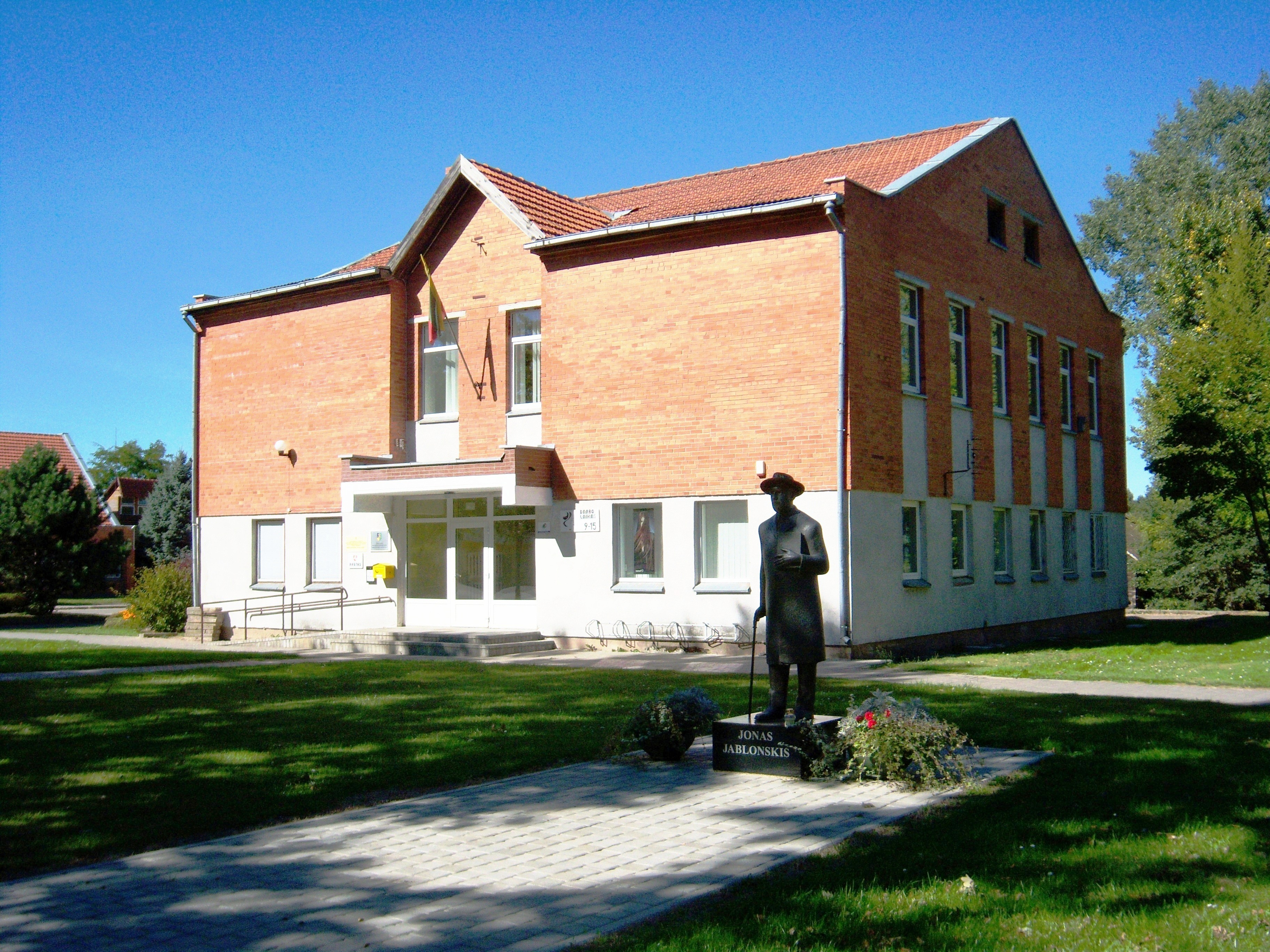
Griškabūdis eldership

The Griškabūdis Eldership (Lithuanian: Griškabūdžio seniūnija) is an eldership of Lithuania, located in the Šakiai District Municipality. In 2021 its population was 2030.
