= Gelgaudiškis Eldership =

Eldership of Lithuania

The Gelgaudiškis Eldership (Lithuanian: Gelgaudiškio seniūnija) is an eldership of Lithuania, located in the Šakiai District Municipality. In 2021 its population was 2417.
