= Bronisław Piłsudski =

Polish ethnologist

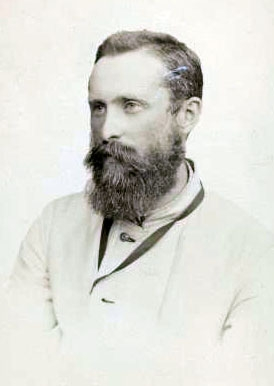
- Born: Bronisław Piotr Piłsudski; 2 November 1866; Zalavas, Vilna Governorate, Russian Empire
- Died: 17 May 1918 (aged 51); Paris, Third French Republic
- Education: Saint Petersburg State University Faculty of Law
- Occupation: Anthropologist
- Known for: Research on the Ainu, Oroks and Nivkhs on Sakhalin Island
- Spouse: Chufsanma
- Children: Sukezo and Kiyo

Piłsudski coat of arms

Bronisław Piotr Piłsudski (Polish: [brɔˈɲiswaf piwˈsut͡skʲi]; 2 November 1866 – 17 May 1918) was a Polish ethnologist who researched the Ainu people after he was exiled by Tsar Alexander III of Russia to the Far East.

Piłsudski considered himself Polish, Lithuanian, and Samogitian. Thus some sources identify him as Polish, others as Lithuanian.

In addition to the Ainu, he conducted research on the Orok and Nivkh indigenous peoples of Sakhalin Island. He pioneered Ainu language research in the late 19th century, laying the groundwork for future studies.

Piłsudski pioneered research into Lithuanian cross crafting.

== Early life ==
Piłsudski was born on November 2, 1866, in the Vilna Governorate of the Russian Empire in present-day Lithuania. He was one of four brothers, including Józef, Adam, and Jan. Józef later served as the Chief of State and First Marshal of Poland. Bronisław and Józef Piłsudski moved to Vilnius in 1874, where they continued self-education for three years. After their mother's death in 1886, they left together for Saint Petersburg. Bronisław Piłsudski passed an examination at a local university.

== Exile and study of Ainu ==
For his involvement with a socialist in a plot to assassinate Alexander III of Russia in 1887 together with Vladimir Lenin's brother Aleksandr Ulyanov, Bronisław was initially sentenced to death, later commuted to fifteen years of hard labor on Sakhalin island (Ulyanov was hanged). He used his time there to conduct research. While on Sakhalin in 1891, he met ethnographer Lev Sternberg. Piłsudski was then sent to the island's southern part. The rest of his prison sentence was changed to ten years of internal exile because he had settled without permission from the Russian authorities.

=== Research into the Ainu ===
Three years later, Piłsudski was given a grant by the Imperial Russian Academy of Sciences to study the Ainu. That year he settled in an Ainu village, fell in love with an Ainu woman, Chufsanma, officially married her and had a son and daughter, Sukezo and Kiyo, with her. His wife was a niece of Chief Bafunkei of the village of Ai in Sakhalin. In 1903 he recorded the Ainu language. He created a dictionary containing 10,000 words of the Ainu language, as well as two more lexicons containing 6,000 words of Nivkh and 2,000 of Orok respectively. He also made film and photographic documentation. Piłsudski also wrote down the myths, culture, music and customs of the Ainu. He built an elementary school in the village where he taught the Russian language and mathematics to the local children. The schools were open only in winter, the slack season of the farm. He joined Wacław Sieroszewski's expedition, whose goal was the Japanese island of Hokkaido. He returned from it in the same year. He traveled extensively around the island. He traveled a total of 4,655 versts (4,966 km).

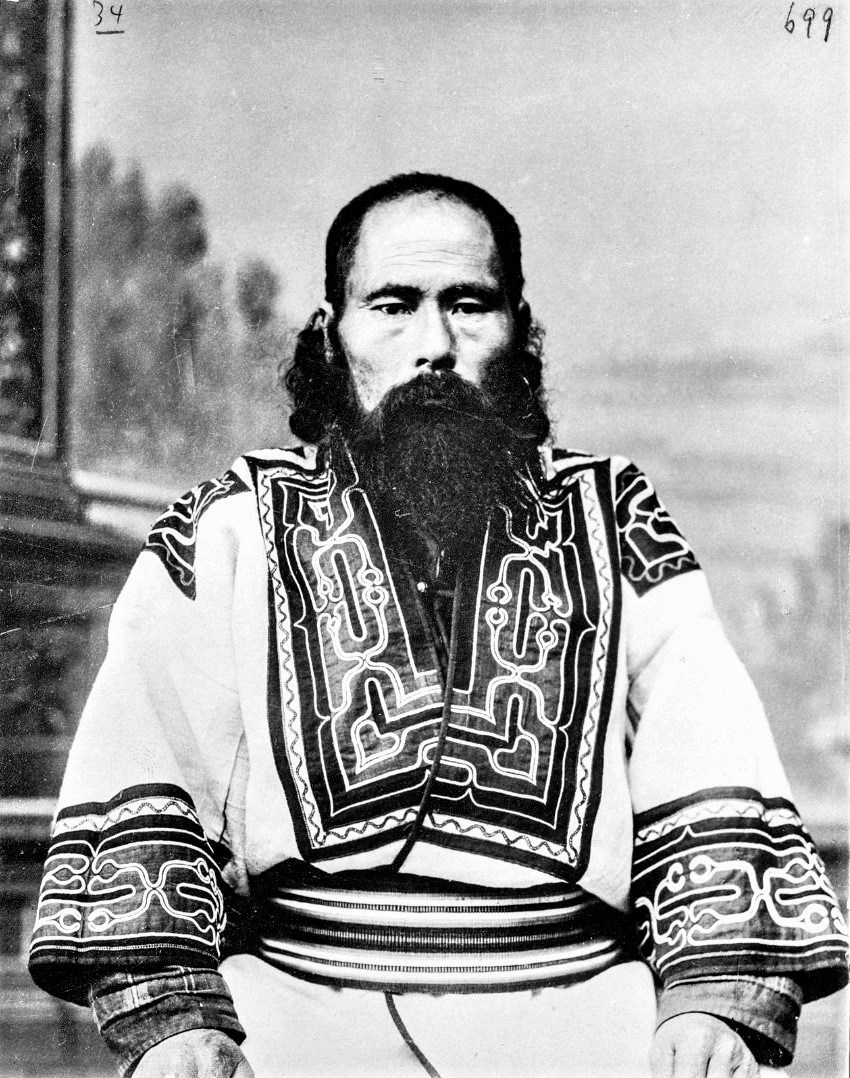
A Sakhalin mixed-blood Ainu-Russian man photographed by Piłsudski ca. 1905

In 1904 the Russo-Japanese War broke out. Due to the rumor that if one spoke Russian he would be conscripted into the Russian Army, the locals began refusing to learn Russian. Also, Ainus were prepared to cooperate with the Japanese after they landed on Sakhalin. A local told Piłsudski that he would not send his son to the school. Chief Bafunkei told Piłsudski to return to Poland while the war continued. Piłsudski reluctantly agreed with him.

Piłsudski moved to Japan by himself, where he was befriended by Ōkuma Shigenobu, Futabatei Shimei, Torii Ryūzō, Katayama Sen, and others, and helped an organization of anti-imperial Russian refugees. Among them, Futabatei Shimei became Piłsudski's very close friend. He described Bronisław as:

an 'odd ball' who was so kind-hearted and innocent like a child that he would always insist in a very excited tone that he needed to do something to help Ainus and that it was his destiny to do that despite the fact that he was always a 'complete broke' then".

In the same year, Piłsudski arrived in Kraków, Austria-Hungary, after traveling from Japan via the United States.

== World War I and death ==
When there was upheaval preceding World War I, Piłsudski escaped to Switzerland. In 1917 he left for Paris, where he worked at the Paris office of the Polish National Committee, which had been founded by Roman Dmowski, the political archrival of Bronisław's younger brother Józef.

On 17 May 1918 Piłsudski drowned in the Seine River near the Pont Neuf. On 21 May 1918, his body was found near the Pont Mirabeau. His death was thought a suicide.

Piłsudski's descendants currently live in Japan, one of whom was Kazuyoshi Kimura, the last remaining male member of the House of Piłsudski, who died on 14 December 2022 at the age of 70. Kimura's story is told in the 2010 documentary Orzeł i Chryzantema. Ostatni z rodu.

== Notable work ==
The Collected Works of Bronisław Piłsudski, translated and edited by Alfred F. Majewicz with the assistance of Elżbieta Majewicz.

- Volume 1: The Aborigines of Sakhalin
- Volume 2: Materials for the Study of the Ainu Language and Folklore (Cracow 1912)
- Volume 3: Materials for the Study of the Ainu Language and Folklore II
- Volume 4: Materials for the Study of Tungusic Languages and Folklore
- Toward a Restoration of Bronisław Piłsudski’s Scholarly Bequeathal: Materials for International Symposium on Bronisław Piłsudski’s Phonographic Records and the Ainu Culture. University of Hokkaido, Sapporo, Japan. September 16–20, 1985

== See also ==
- Polish Museum, Rapperswil

== Sources ==
- "Piłsudski, Bronisław," Encyklopedia Powszechna PWN (PWN Universal Encyclopedia), Warsaw, Państwowe Wydawnictwo Naukowe, vol. 3, 1975, p. 521.
- "Piłsudski, Bronisław," Encyklopedia Polski (Encyclopedia of Poland), Kraków, Wydawnictwo Ryszard Kluszczyński, 1996, ISBN 83-86328-60-6, p. 505.
