= Lekėčiai Eldership =

Eldership of Lithuania

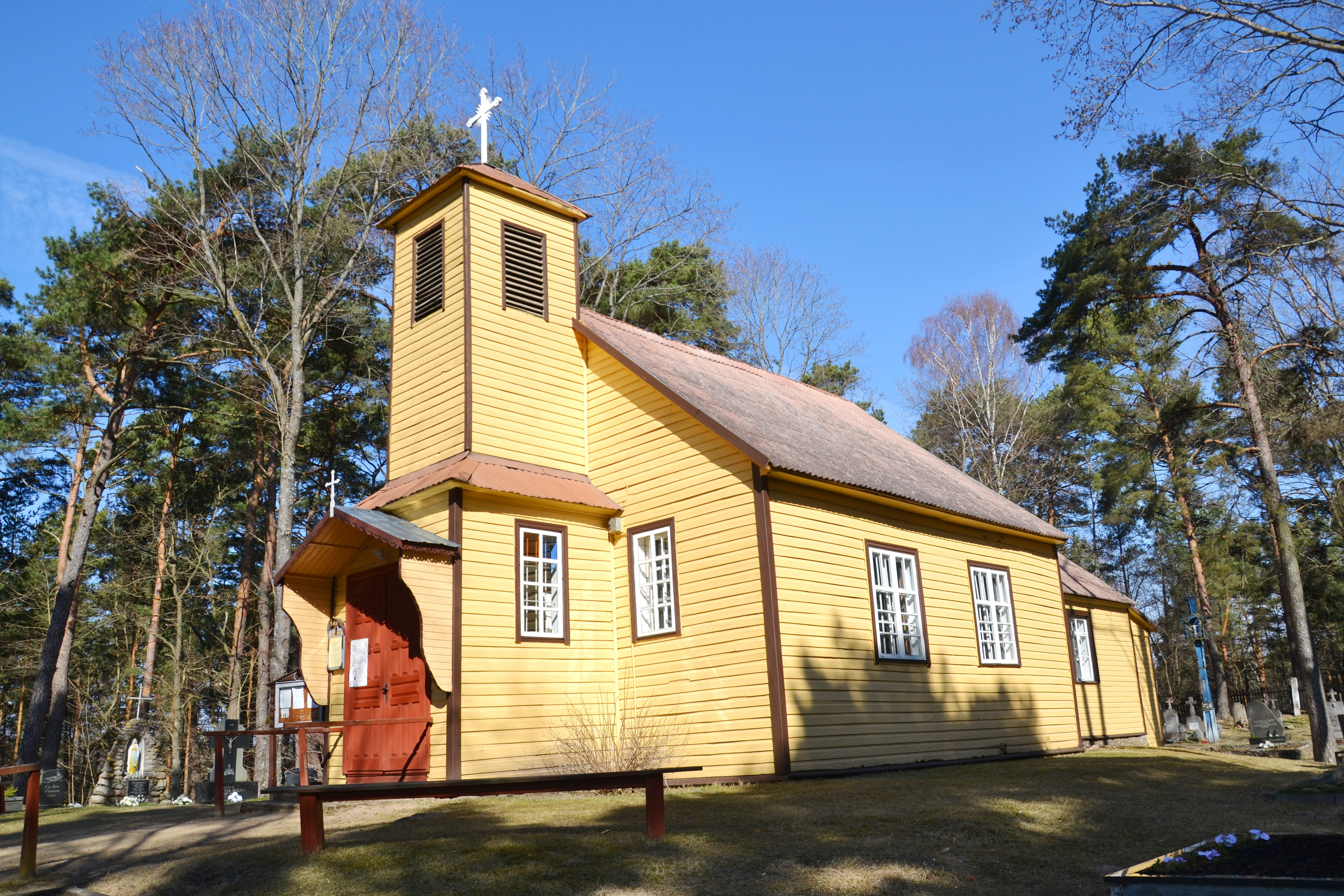
Kretkampis Roman Catholic Church, Šakiai district, Lithuania

The Lekėčiai Eldership (Lithuanian: Lekėčių seniūnija) is an eldership of Lithuania, located in the Šakiai District Municipality. In 2021 its population was 1316.
