= Kiduliai Eldership =

Administrative area of Lithuania

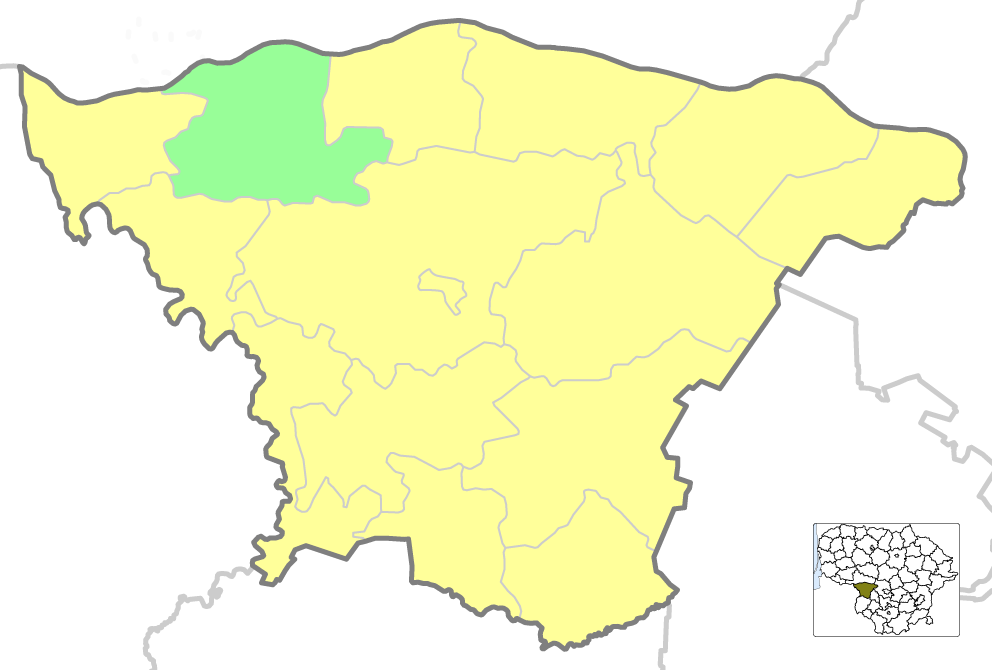
Location of Kiduliai Eldership in Šakiai District Municipality

The Kiduliai Eldership (Lithuanian: Kidulių seniūnija) is an eldership of Lithuania, located in the Šakiai District Municipality. In 2021, the population was 1809.
