= Dembiński =

Dembiński or Dembinski is a surname, and may refer to:

- Bolesław Dembiński (1833–1914), Polish composer and organist
- Henryk Dembiński (1791–1864), Polish engineer and general
- Henryk Dembiński (politician) (1908–1941), Polish political activist and journalist
- Jacek Dembiński (born 1969), Polish footballer
- Paul Dembinski (born 1955), Polish-Swiss economist
- Ryszard Dembiński (1924–2008), Polish army officer
- Stefan Dembiński (1887–1972), Polish general
- Walenty Dembiński (died 1585), statesman in the Kingdom of Poland
