= Sudargas Eldership =

Eldership of Lithuania

The Sudargas Eldership (Lithuanian: Sudargo seniūnija) is an eldership of Lithuania, located in the Šakiai District Municipality. In 2021 its population was 719.
