= Čiobiškis Manor =

Coordinates: 54°57′8″N 24°39′21″E

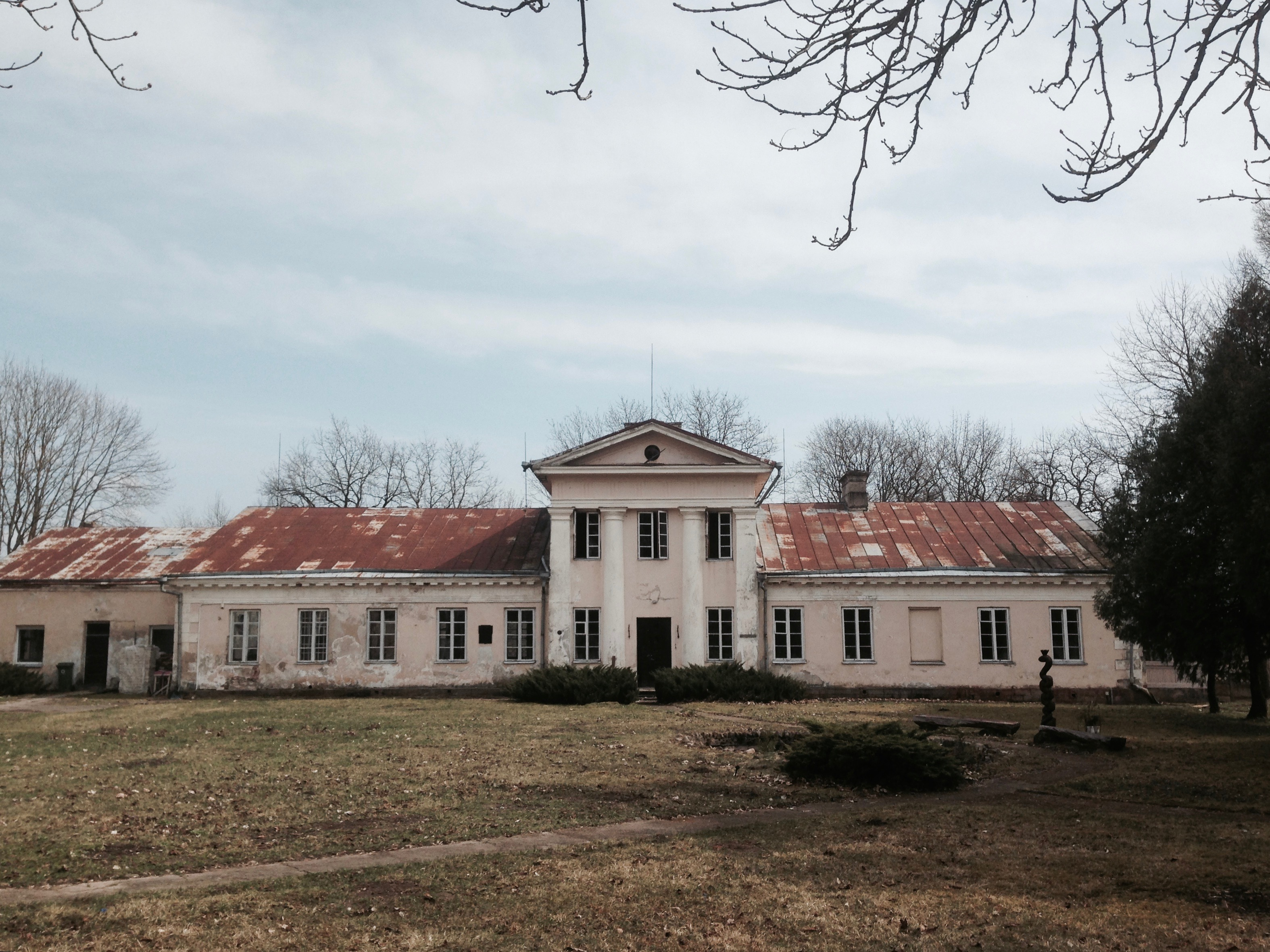
- Interactive map of Čiobiškis Manor

General information
- Architectural style: Classical
- Location: Vilties g. 1, Čiobiškis, Lithuania
- Completed: 1794

Design and construction
- Architect: Laurynas Gucevičius

Čiobiškis Manor (Polish: dwór Czabiszki) is a former residential manor on the confluence of Musė and Neris rivers, the southern part of Čiobiškis, in Lithuania. The manor complex consists of the manor, farm labourers' building and stable. It is presently (2020) undergoing reconstruction.

== History ==
=== The Radziwiłł Family ===
Čiobiškis Manor was first mentioned in 1529, when the area belonged to the Radziwiłł family.

=== The Švikovski Family ===
In the 18th century, it was owned by the Švikovski family.

They built Čiobiškis Manor, designed by Laurynas Gucevičius, in 1794 at the confluence of the Musės and Neris rivers.

The manor used to have a chapel but the landlords Švikovski built a church in a different place. At the end of the 18th century, the church burnt down.

=== The Piłsudski Family ===
==== Jan Chryzostom Piłsudski (c1768-1837) ====
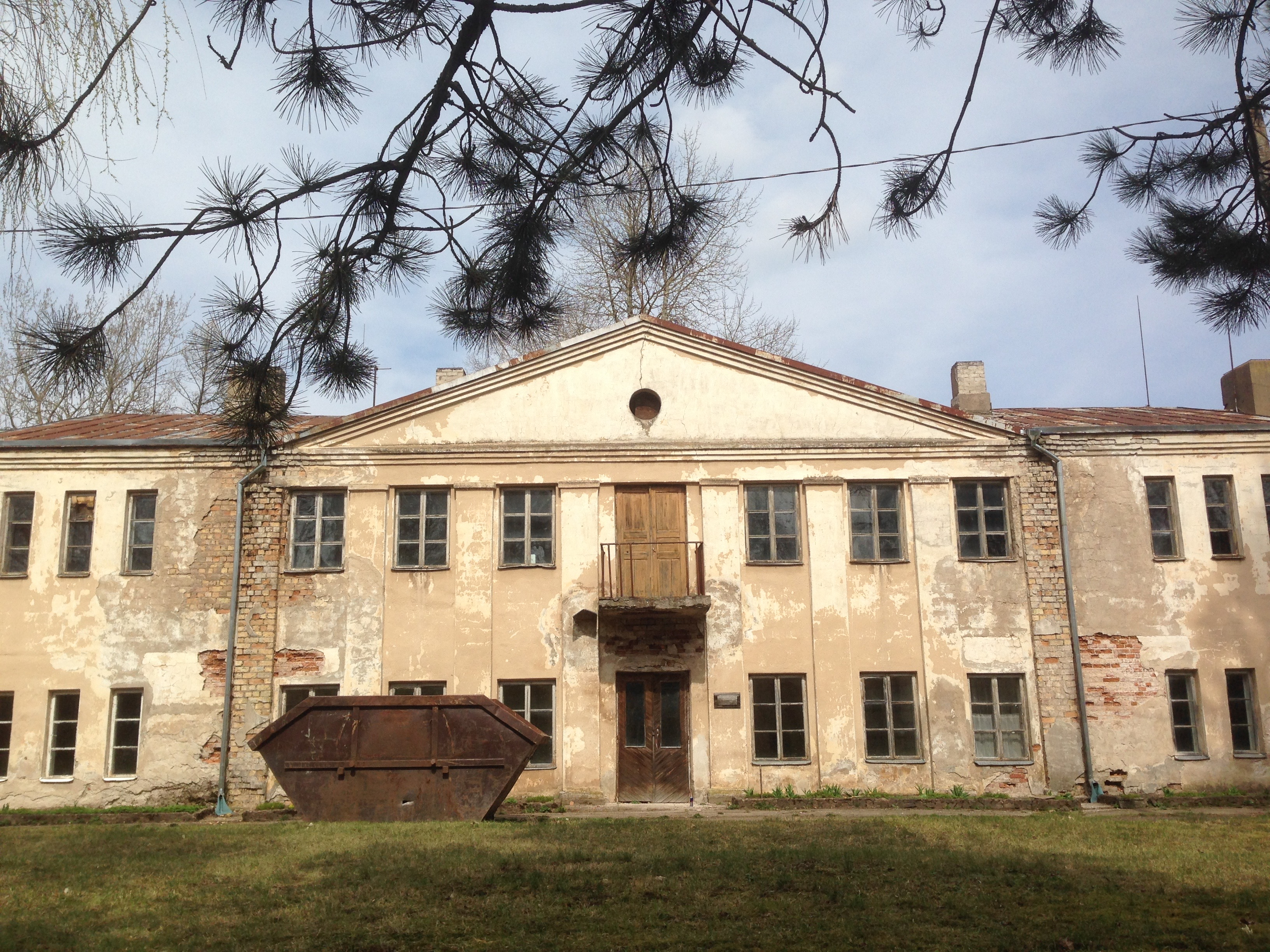
Čiobiškis Manor Servants' Quarters (2018)

Čiobiškis Manor was then purchased by Jan Chryzostom Piłsudski (c1768-1837) in 1794.

Before selling the manor to Piłsudski, Švikovski obliged the new owner to build a new church.

Piłsudski had Čiobiškis Church built in 1810–1816. It too is thought to have been designed by Laurynas Gucevičius though that can't be proven.

After Napoleon's defeat at Waterloo, Jan's son-in-law, Antoni Chodakowski (1784–1831), a Lieutenant in Napoleon's Polish Lancer Regiment, returned to Lithuania with his wife, Marcjancella Chodakowska (née Piłsudska) (1797-d.) and two sons. The family moved into Čiobiškis with Jan Piłsudski.

==== Stefan Aleksander Piłsudski (1823-1864) ====
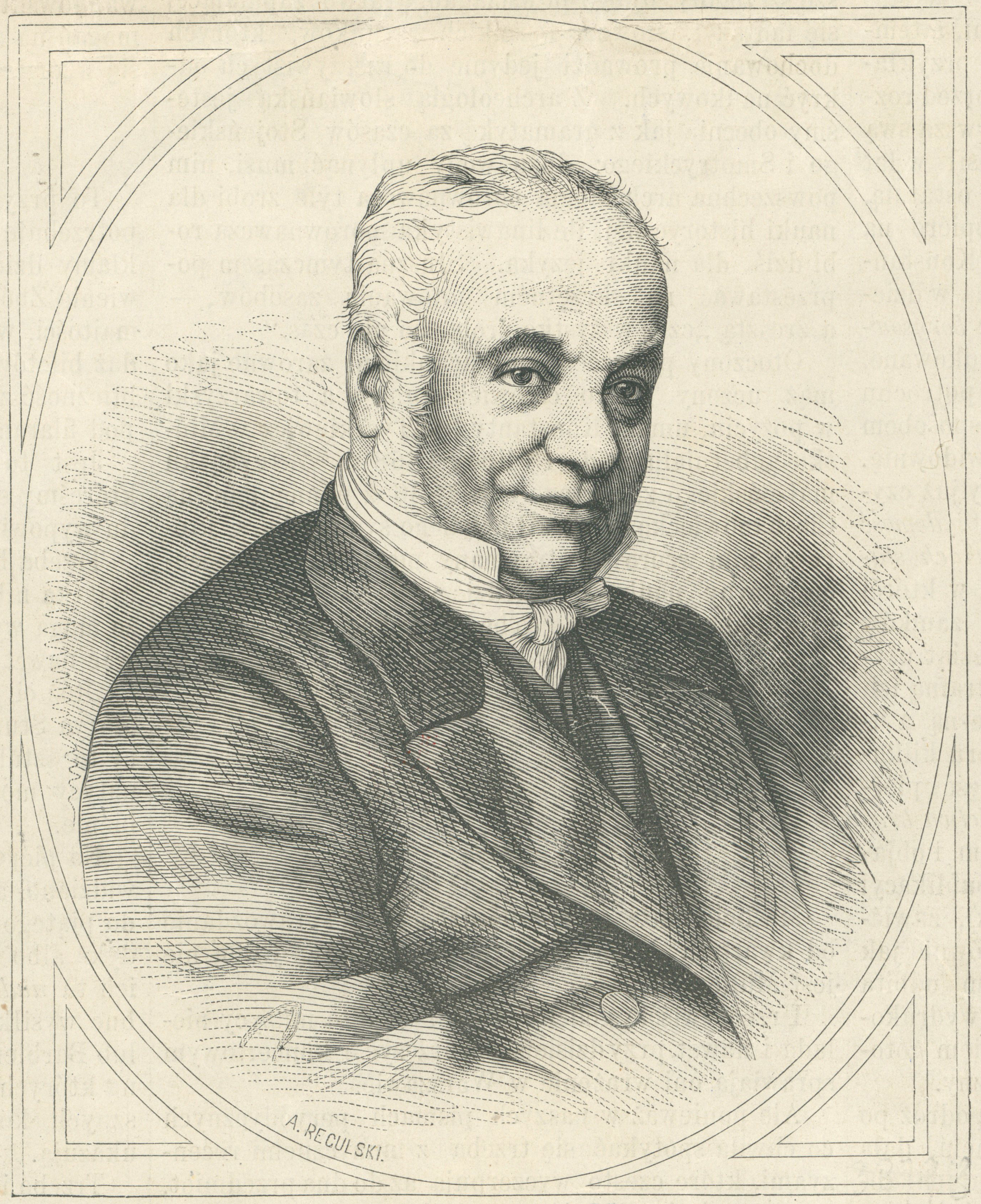
Konstanty Tyszkiewicz (1868)

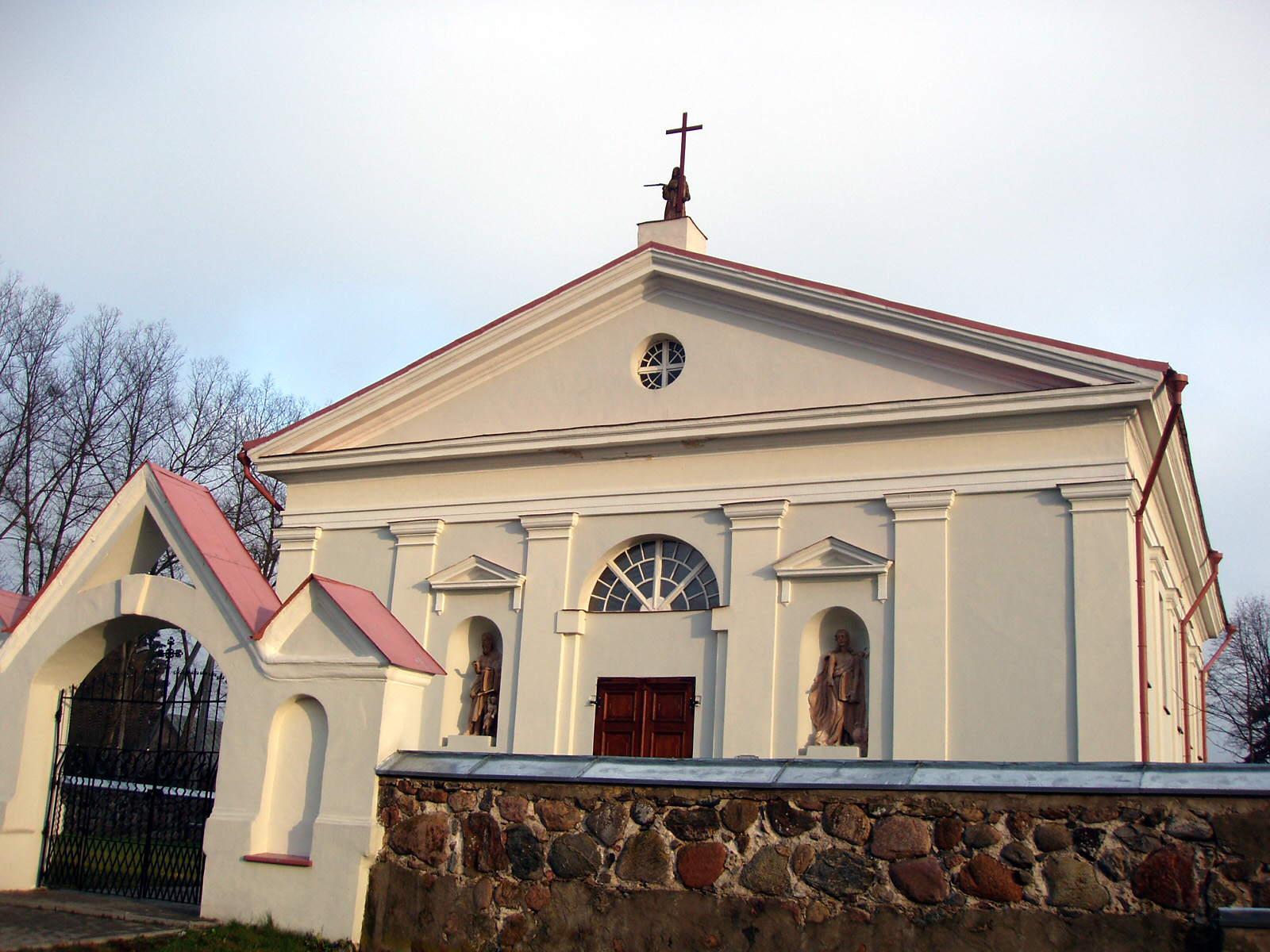
Čiobiškis Church

When Jan died in 1837, Čiobiškis was passed down to his grandson, Stefan Aleksander Piłsudski.

In 1857, Čiobiškis was visited by Count Konstanty Tyszkiewicz, an archaeologist and ethnographer. Tyszkiewicz was performing an expedition on the river Neris, from the source to the mouth. He wrote in his book Neris ir jos krantai (en: 'Neris and its Banks') commenting on Čiobiškis (translated):

"Čiobiškis is the landowner Piłsudski's estate. [...] On the shores of the Neris, in the greenery of old trees and gardens, its masonry manor house was lighted by the greenhouses along the Neris shore. The chapel was bollous and graceful, although small. It has recently been built. The manor house is one of those rare and magnificent buildings, which are so rare in our country… The brave proportions and fine contours reflect the art of Gucevičius' architecture".

==== Konstantin Aleksander Piłsudski (1852-1903) ====
Čiobiškis was passed down to Stefan Piłsudski's son Konstantin Aleksander Piłsudski (1852–1903) and then probably to his son, Eugeniusz Antoni Piłsudski (1888-c1914).

In 1910, Čiobiškis was sold out of the Piłsudski family to Russian colonists. It had been in the Piłsudski family for 116 years or five generations.

=== Interwar Period ===
In 1918, the manor's ownership went to the state. Then, the more distant lands were distributed away to individuals, while the 80a territory surrounding the central buildings remained the state's property and was turned into a children's orphanage.

In 1944–1945 a partisan headquarter of the Didžioji Kova military district was organized by Jonas Misiūnas-Green Devil in the manor. In February 1945, Stasys Misiūnas-Old Man led LLA 5th district's headquarters company to permanently settle inside the attics of both laborers houses of the manor. Since 16 February, the partisans newspaper "Freedom Way" began being published from the location, with Jonas Markulis-Ghost redacting.

On 27 March 1945, the headquarter was betrayed by the residing orphan Kazys Snieginis and a battle between the NKVD soldiers and partisans commenced. The partisans Kazys Surmilavičius-Klevelis, leader of the district's I battalion, and partisan Adomas Lapinskas-Uosis had been on a walk when they noticed the soviets near the Neris river and attempted to warn the manor. Surmilavičius was shot on the spot, while Lapinskas was injured, chased, and finally gunned down near the Rusių Ragas village, choosing to drown himself in the river.

Afterwards, the storming of the manor started. The laborers house of the manor was shelled by the NKVD killing 3 partisans – Juozas Marcinauskas-Pluta, Jonas Markulis-Vaiduoklis and Mykolas Tveraga-Aras during the attack. Helper Janina Marcinauskaitė-Neužmirštuolė was captured. S. Misiūnas was injured and managed to initially evade capture, but was caught some days later – both were sentenced to 10 and 5 years in prison respectfully. The only two free survivors of the attack were partisan Česlovas Pavasaris-Giant and helper Aldona Sipavičiūtė-Velnio Išpera. NKVD soldiers captured weapons and ammunition, uniforms, typewriters and equipment, radio transmitter and two receivers, over 1,000 chervonets as well as other supplies stored in the headquarter.

On 6 July 1995 a wooden commemorative plaque was hung up to honour the partisans on the main manor's building. In 2002, a granite one was also added on the laborers house.

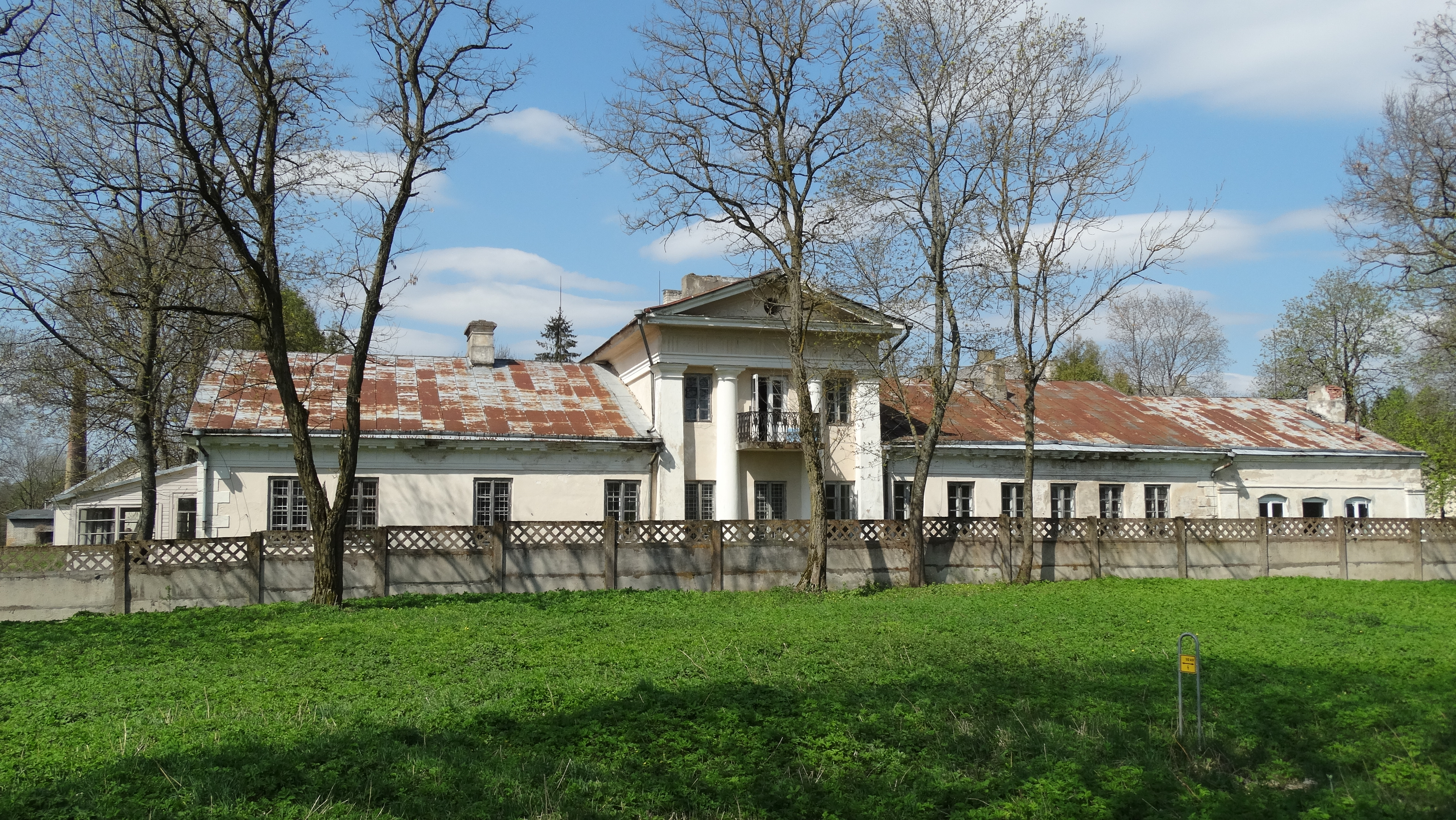
Čiobiškis Manor (2017)

=== Soviet Period ===
After World War II, it was turned into a boarding-school. In 1965 the manor and buildings were reorganized into a special education school-orphanage for troubled boys.

=== Lithuanian Independence Period ===
In 2011 the school was closed.

Čiobiškis Manor was privately bought by Eugenija Vagnerienė and is being refurbished (2020) to be a hotel, spa and cultural centre.
