= Žvirgždaičiai Eldership =

Eldership of Lithuania

The Žvirgždaičiai Eldership (Lithuanian: Žvirgždaičių seniūnija) is an eldership of Lithuania, located in the Šakiai District Municipality. In 2021 its population was 490.
