= Gelgaudiškis Manor =

- Gelgaudiškio dvaras (Lithuanian)
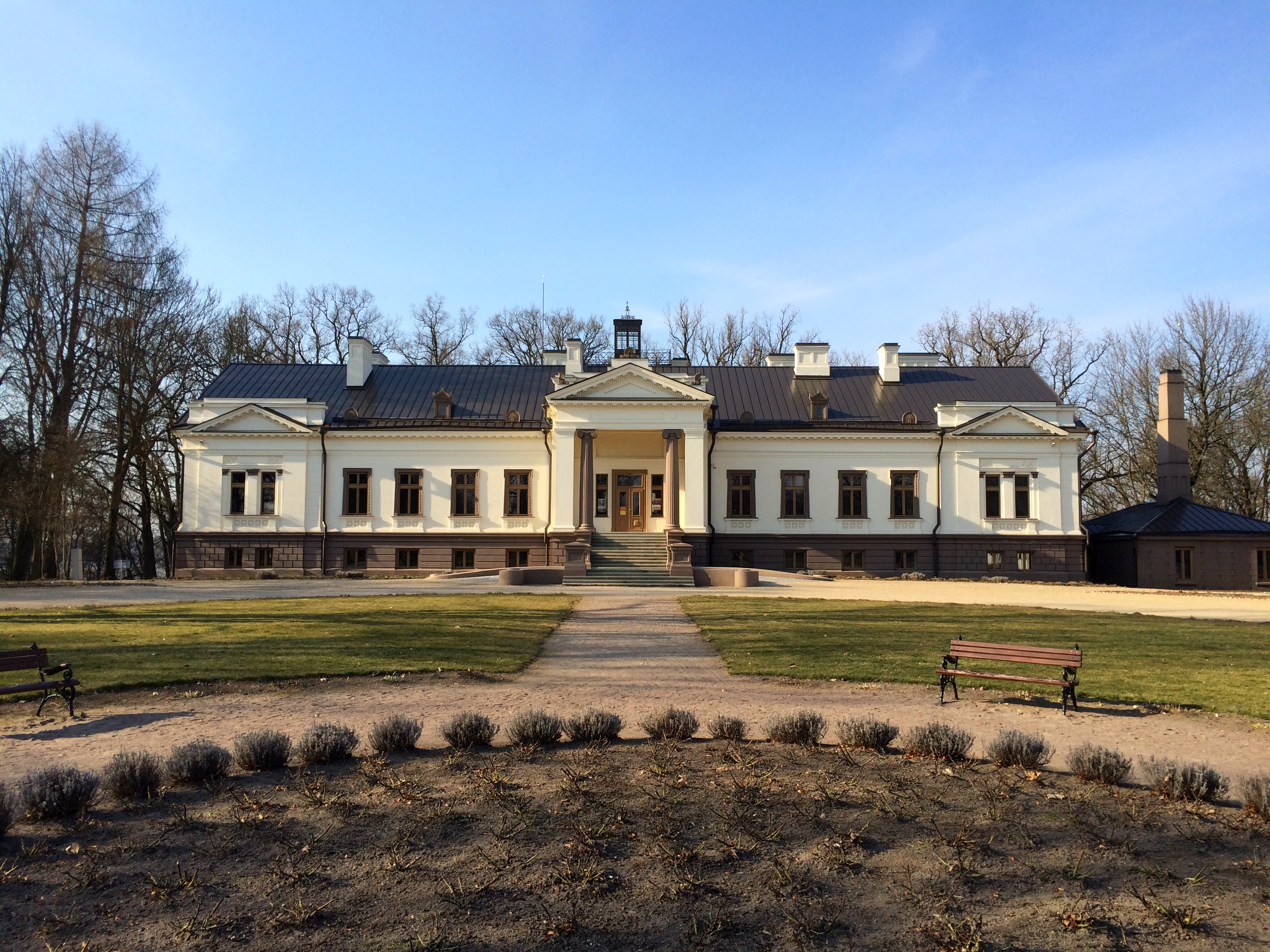
- Gelgaudiškis Manor in 2016, main façade
- Interactive map of Gelgaudiškis Manor
- 55.0787°N 22.9803°E
- Type: Manor
- Location: Gelgaudiškis, Lithuania

History
- Built: 1846

Site notes
- Architectural style: Neoclassical
- Restored: 2012
- Current use: Museum
- Owner: Šakiai District Municipality

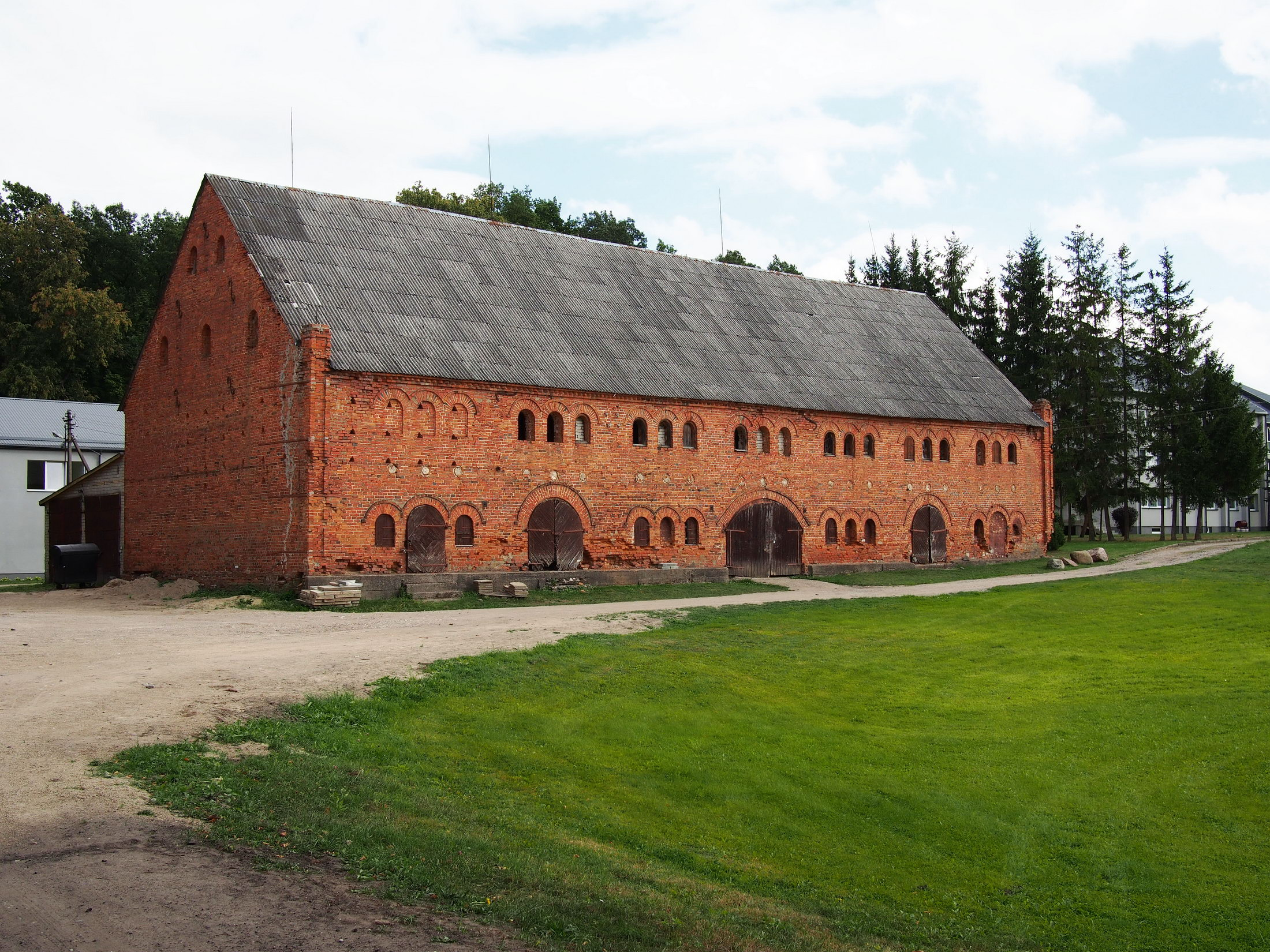
Gelgaudiškis Manor barn

Gelgaudiškis Manor (Lithuanian: Gelgaudiškio dvaras) is a former residential manor in Gelgaudiškis, Šakiai District Municipality, Lithuania.

== Etymology ==
The name Gelgaudiškis derives from the name of Jurgis Gedgaudas, a diplomat from the Grand Duchy of Lithuania, who built a castle on the right bank of the Nemunas River not long after the Battle of Žalgiris, near present-day town of Gelgaudiškis. Which at the time was called Gedigoldiškis, Gedigaudiškis.

== Architecture ==
The present manor house was commissioned by Gustav von Keudell and built in 1846. The manor house is a single-storey with an attic neoclassical-style building whose architect is unknown. After being left in disrepair for around 30 years, the manor house was fully restored in 2012.

== History ==
=== Early history ===
In written sources from the early 15th century, Gelgaudiškis is regarded as a part of Skirsnemunė manor. In 1504 or 1507, the Grand Duke Alexander granted Gelgaudiškis with the woodland from the Nemunas to Siesartis rivers to the nobleman Ivanas Sapiega. After his death, the estate passed on to his widow Elžbieta Sapiegienė. Stanislovas Skopas, the lord of Skirsnemunė, took advantage of this situation and seized Gelgaudiškis by force. Only after the involvement of King Sigismund the Old was the manor returned to the widow, and after her death, it became the subject of disputes between her stepsons. After lengthy negotiations, in 1566 the manor of Gelgaudiškis passed to Povilas Sapiega castellan of Kyiv and the owner of Zapyškis estate, who built the first church in Gelgaudiškis in 1578. After the death of Povilas Sapiega in 1580, the manor passed to Andrius Sapiega. Who quickly leased the manor with all its buildings and land, including the Zapyškis estate, to Grand Stolnik of Lithuania, the elder of Kaunas and Telšiai, Jan Hieronimowicz Chodkiewicz. Since then, the manor has changed hands frequently and the Sapiehas' rule in Gelgaudiškės ended.

In 1586, the manor was bought by a minor noble Kasparas Oziemblovskis.

=== 17th century ===
In the Gelgaudiškis church book, in 1640, the brothers Motiejus and Andrius Oziemblovskis, sons of Kasparas, and Stanislovas Oziemblovskis, an Elder of Vilkmergė, were recorded as the owners of the manor. Later, the manor passed to Danielius Chžonstovkis from Samogitia, as dowry after marrying Elžbieta Oziemblovskaitė. Chžonstovkis remarried after her death. Since the Chžonstovskis family were Calvinists, they built a separate burial chapel.

After the death of Chžonstovskis in 1665, the inventory of Gelgaudiškis manor was compiled. From the inventory, it is known that the manor could be accessed through four gates. One of the gates was adjacent to the cheese cellar. The manor also included several residential houses, barns, a few granaries, threshing floor, a malthouse, a bakery, and a sauna.

From 1691 the manor belonged to Kazimieras Oziemblovskis, who built a second wooden church. Later, the manor passed to the Gelgaudas family.

=== 18th-19th century ===
In the second half of the 18th century (or possibly earlier), Gelgaudiškis were governed by the Czartoryski family. In 1797, Prince Adam Kazimierz Czartoryski sold Gelgaudiškis. It was bought by a German baron, Theodor Friedrich von Keudell, born in 1751,

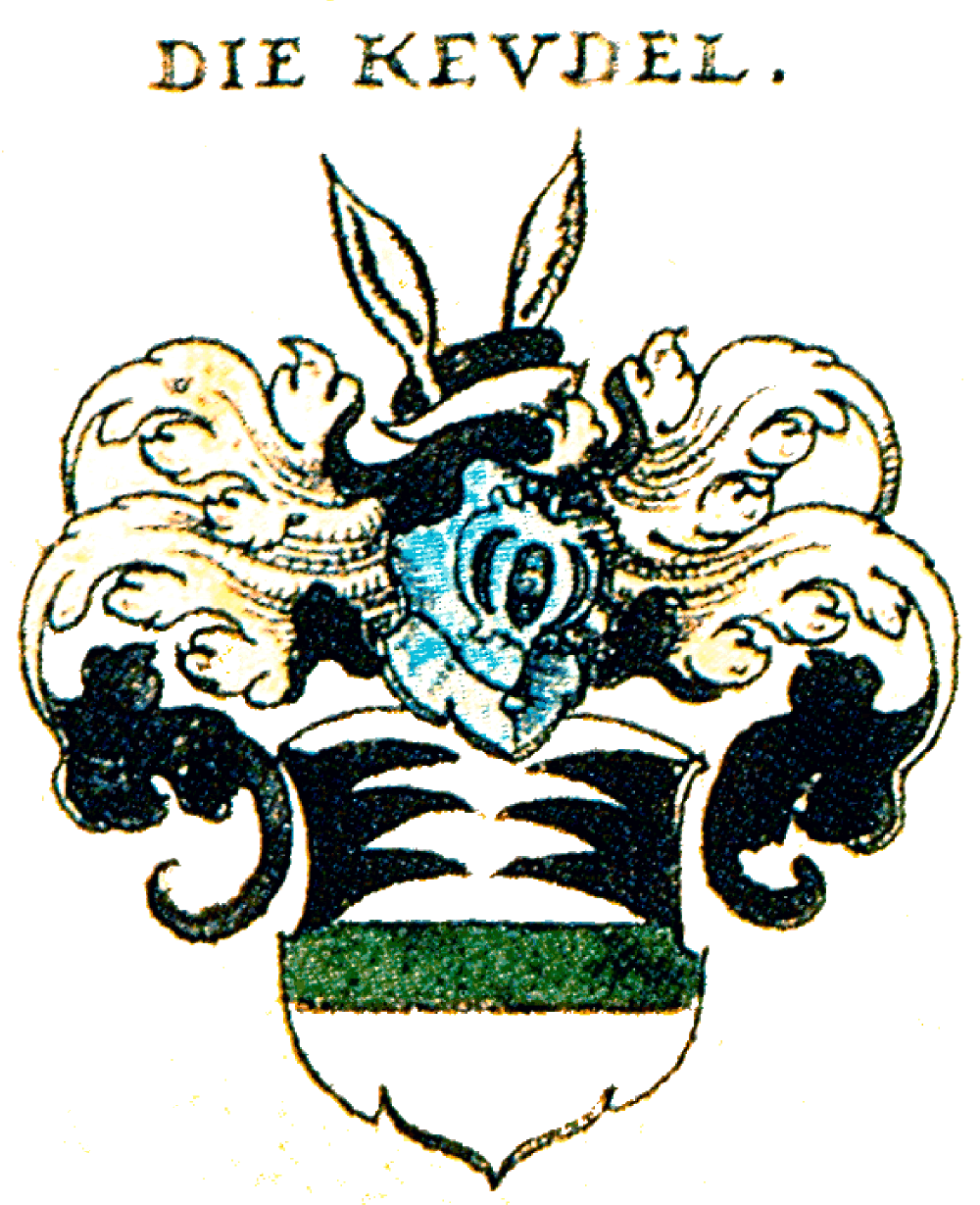
Coat of Arms of the Keudell family (1605)

Friedrich von Keudell bought only the Lower Gelgaudiškis for 75 000 ducats on preferential terms (which were granted to the German baron by Prussia, which had occupied the region). Upper Gelgaudiškis was bought by Otonas Melkė around the same time. Lower Gelgaudiškis belonged to four generations of the von Keudell family. When the von Keudells acquired the Plieniškės estate in 1809, it was likely the largest estate in the whole of Sudovia. In 1818, the owner of the manor, Teodor von Keudell, applied to the authorities of the Augustów Voivodeship for permission to establish a new Evangelical Lutheran parish. Gustav von Keudell, who inherited the estate while still a minor, built a new main manor house between 1842 and 1846. When his daughter died, Gustav built an orphanage for homeless children as a homage to her. After the old church burnt down in 1868, he built the current church of Gelgaudšikis.

The von Keudells began to bring Germans to the lands of Gelgaudiškis, attempting to Germanise the region. The Lithuanian peasantry had to endure an exceptionally hard corvée, they worked all 7 days of the week. During the 1863 Uprising, the manor was attacked by the rebels, who seized the estate's treasury with 1 500 silver roubles. The Lithuanian national revival in Gelgaudiškis and its lands began to manifest itself quite early. During the time of the Lithuanian press ban, the manor was a significant centre for the distribution of the illegal Lithuanian press.

At the end of the 19th century, a Tsar's decree forbade foreigners to own estates on the border territory of the Russian Empire, so the von Keudells were forced to sell the estate and moved to Dresden

In 1898, the manor of Gelgaudiškis was bought by Ona Konča-Komarienė, who did not have time to enjoy it to the full - she died a year and a half later. After she died in 1900, the manor was inherited by her son Medardas Komaras. He was the last owner of Gelgaudiškis Manor who came from a noble family.

=== 20th century ===
Coat of Arms of Komar family

When Gelgaudiškis was bought by Komar family, the new owners substantially rebuilt the house without altering the exterior. They redesigned the interior layout and furnished it with ornate furniture, installed a telephone line that connected the manor with Šakiai and all the manors and estates. Medardas Komaras and his family resided here until the World War I.

The Revolution of 1905 also affected Gelgaudiškis. Around 400 estate workers went on strike, and around 140 workers demanded a 50% wage increase. On 20 June, the Russian police commander, Capt. Pakrovski and Komar reached an agreement with the workers. On 11 December the workers destroyed the files and letters of the parish administration. Later, in retaliation, the Russians ordered the inhabitants of Gelgaudiškis to pay a fine of 1,000 roubles.

Komars established brickyard was probably the largest in the whole of Sudovia. It produced bricks, hearth tiles, and terracotta pipes. The manor treasury was also supplemented by profits from peat mining. To boost business, the landlord built a few narrow-gauge railway lines. The manor's ground floor was mainly used for guests and hunters. Komar and his wife themselves usually slept in their private apartments in the attic. In keeping with the old traditions of the manor, there was also a gunroom on the ground floor, where the Medard Komar, who was not fond of hunting himself, kept a large collection of guns and old suits of armor. During the outbreak of World War I, Komar and his wife fled to Poland. In 1918, Jonas Budrys, a representative of the reborn Lithuanian government, was sent to the manor. Although the German von Keudell family moved out of Gelgaudiškis at the end of the 19th century, Marlene, the widow of the last German owner of the manor, Franz von Keudell, was laid to rest in the manor's cemetery around 1920.

During the time of Lithuanian land reforms of 1919-1939, the manor's territory was transferred to volunteers and soldiers of the Lithuanian Wars of Independence, and to the manor's workers. Only in 1921 Medard Komar became concerned about the fate of his manor and appealed to a notary in Klaipėda to have the manor's property taken care of by the former neighbour of Komaras, the owner of Upper Gelgaudiškis Mečislovas Šemeta. The state bequeathed only 80 hectares of land to Komar, which Šemeta eventually bought from him.

In 1922, the state sold the manor house to the Lithuanian-American nuns of the Sisters of Mercy. They donated the entire mansion to the Archdiocese of Kaunas, which, with the help of the Lithuanian Women's Care Committee, established an orphanage, which operated until 1941.
