= Kriūkai Eldership =

Eldership of Lithuania

The Kriūkai Eldership (Lithuanian: Kriūkų seniūnija) is an eldership of Lithuania, located in the Šakiai District Municipality. In 2021 its population was 1457.
