= Slavikai Eldership =

Eldership of Lithuania

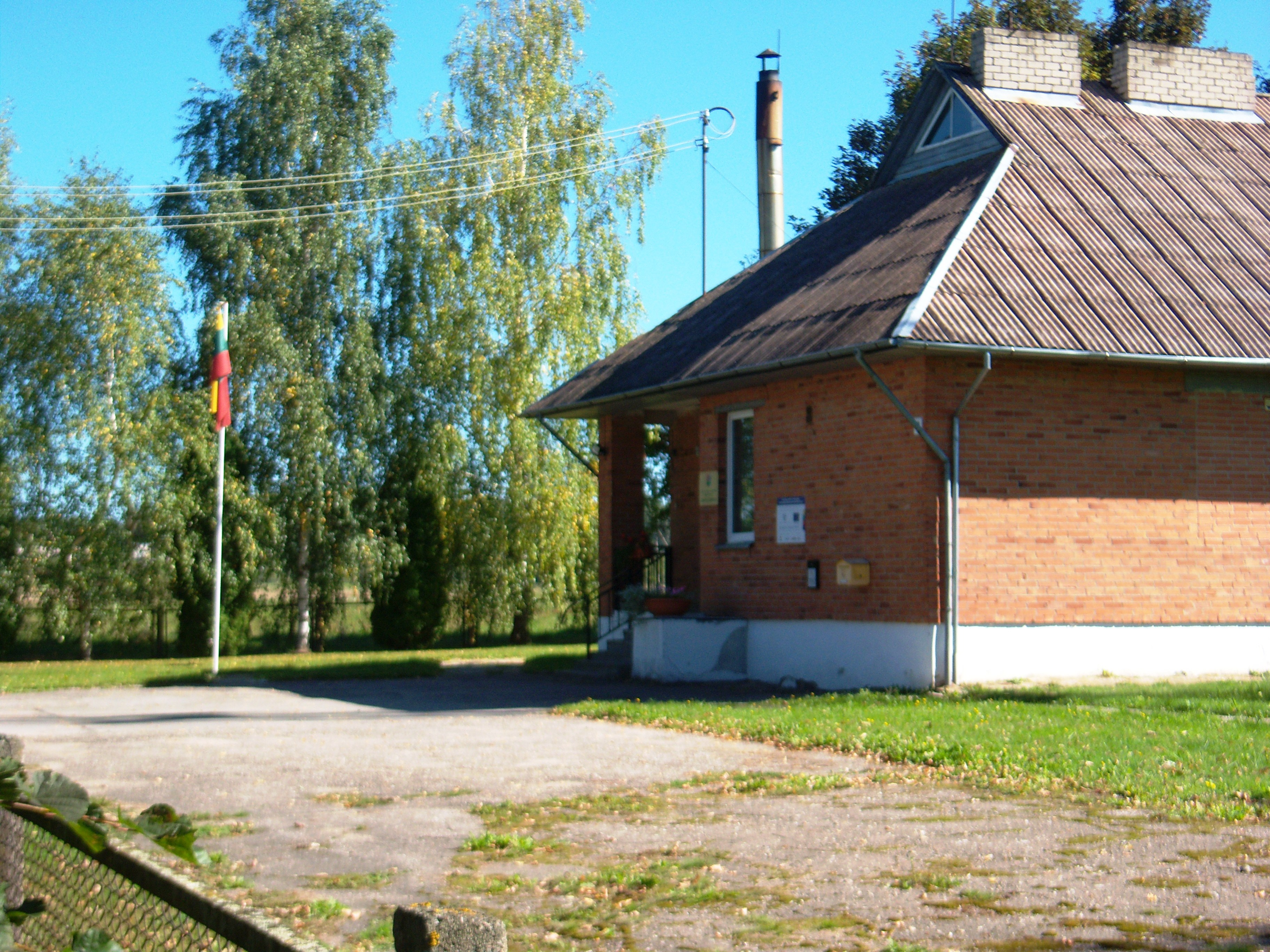
Slavikai Eldership, Šakiai District, Lithuania

The Slavikai Eldership (Lithuanian: Slavikų seniūnija) is an eldership of Lithuania, located in the Šakiai District Municipality. In 2021 its population was 554.
