= Franciszek Piłsudski =

Polish–Lithuanian nobleman

- Born: 1713
- Died: 1791 (aged 77–78)
- Offices: Podczaszy (Deputy Cup Bearer)
- Noble family: Piłsudski
- Spouse: 1. Countess Marcjancella Komorowska 2. Joanna von Rönne
- Issue: 1. Jan Chryzostom Piłsudski 2. Aniela Piłsudska
- Father: Ferdinand Ignatius Piłsudski
- Mother: Ludwika Urszula Piłsudska (née Billewicz)

Franciszek Piłsudski (1713–1791) Piłsudski coat of arms, was a Lithuanian nobleman, Colonel and Commander in the Samogitian division of the Grand Ducal Lithuanian army, Deputy cup-bearer, member of the Sejm of the Polish–Lithuanian Commonwealth and recipient of the Order of Saint Stanislaus (1779) and the Great Cross of Divine Providence.

== Biography ==
Franciszek Piłsudski was born in 1713 in Pajūralis Manor to Ferdynand Ignacy Piłsudski (c1670-c1719) and Ludwika Urszula Piłsudska (née Biłłewicz), Mogiła coat of arms. He had four brothers, Jan, Ludwik, Aleksander and Antoni.

He was a Colonel and Commander in the Samogitian division of the Grand Ducal Lithuanian army.

He became Deputy cup-bearer and a member of the Sejm in 1758.

In the Convocation Sejm (1764), he supported the election of Stanisław August Poniatowski as a member of the Szlachta from the Duchy of Samogitia.

He was also a member of the Duchy of Samogitia to the Sejm of 1766 in Czaplica.

== Manors ==
Franciszek Piłsudski inherited Pajūralis Manor from his father.

He bought Šilalė Estate (from his brother), Aukštieji Gelgaudiškiai Estate, Putvinskiai Manor and several other estates, thus greatly expanding the family's holdings.

By 1790 Franciszek Piłsudski ruled Pajūralis, Šilalė, Viešvėnai (50 km north of Šilalė), and Laukuva (16 km north of Šilalė). He owned four districts, seven manor houses, forty-one villages and two minor noblemen.

He also had Šilalė church built in 1769-1779 (which has since been replaced).

== Marriage and Children ==
Franciszek Piłsudski married twice.

His first wife was Countess Marcjancella Komorowska, Korczak coat of arms (daughter of Bartłomiej and Teresa née Oziemrałowski, Radwan coat of arms) with whom he had Jan Chryzostom Piłsudski (1770–1837).

His second wife was Joanna von Rönne with whom he had Aniela Piłsudska (who later married Jan Frąckiewicz).

== Awards ==
Franciszek Piłsudski received the Order of Saint Stanislaus (1779) and the Great Cross of Divine Providence.
