= Piłsudski coat of arms =

Polish coat of arms

Piłsudski
- Alternative name: Kościesza odm. Piłsudski
- Families: 1 names Piłsudski

Piłsudski is a Polish coat of arms. The Piłsudski family, whom belonged to the Polish nobility (szlachta), used it.

== Blazon ==
The Coat of arms of Piłsudski is a variation of the Coat of arms of Kościesza

== Notable bearers ==
Notable bearers of this coat of arms include:

- Józef Piłsudski Chief of State and Marshal of Poland
- Adam Piłsudski
- Jadwiga Piłsudska
- Jan Piłsudski
- Bronisław Piłsudski
- Franciszek Piłsudski
- Jan Chryzostom Piłsudski

== See also ==
- Polish heraldry
- Heraldic family
- List of Polish nobility coats of arms

== Related Coat of Arms ==
- Kościesza Coat of Arms

== Bibliography ==
- Herbarz polski, Tadeusz Gajl, Gdańsk 2007, ISBN 978-83-60597-10-1
