= Paul Dembinski =

Swiss economist and author

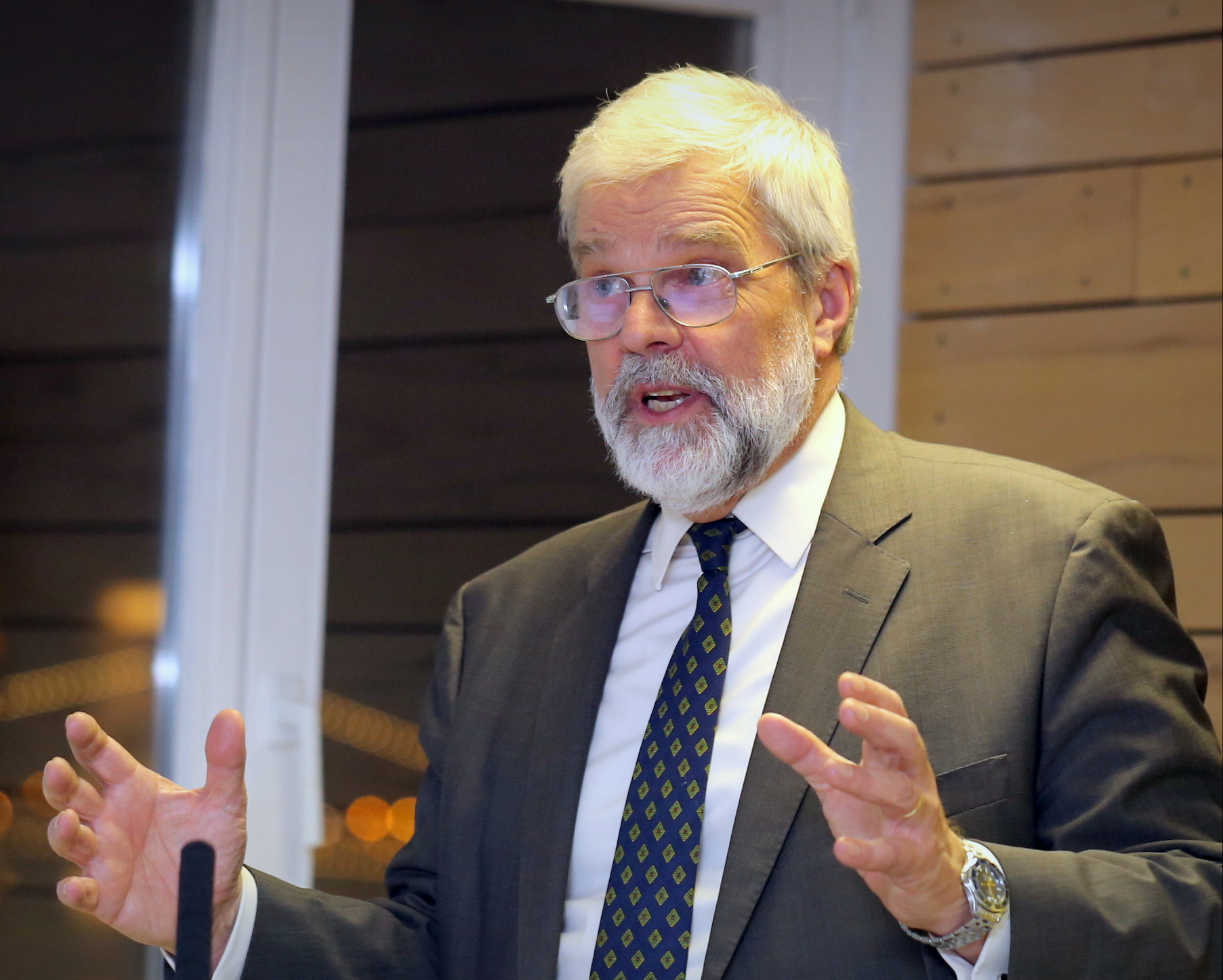
Paul Dembinski

Paul H. Dembinski (born 16 May 1955 in Kraków) is a Polish-Swiss economist.

== Life ==
Paul Dembinski obtained a licence and a certificate of advanced study at the Geneva Graduate Institute of International Studies. Starting in 1979, he was a research assistant at the University of Geneva. In 1982, he received his doctorate in economics from the University of Geneva. In 1990, he became an associate professor at the University of Fribourg where he holds the professorship for strategy and international competition. He also teaches at the Università Cattolica del Sacro Cuore in Milan.

Dembinski is director of the Geneva-based "Observatoire de la finance" (Obsfin), founded in 1996, which is committed to business ethics. He is an expert for non-governmental organizations such as UNCTAD, OECD and ILO. Together with Alain Schoenenberger, he is the founder of the Institute for Socio-Economic Studies Eco'Diagnostic.

He has published numerous papers on topics of economic and financial globalization.

== Selected work ==
- The Logic of the Planned Economy: The Seeds of the Collapse, 1991, ISBN 978-0198286868
- Enron and World Finance: A Case Study in Ethics. Palgrave Macmillan, New York/Basingstoke 2005, ISBN 1-4039-4763-5
- Finance: Servant or Deceiver? Financialization at the crossroad. Palgrave Macmillan, New York/Basingstoke 2009, ISBN 0-230-22037-1
- Thinking Ethics while Learning Finance: Ethical Issues in Practice and Theory. Palgrave Macmillan, New York/Basingstoke 2009, ISBN 0-230-00698-1
- zusammen mit Barbara Fryzel: The Role of Large Enterprises in Democracy and Society. Palgrave Macmillan, New York/Basingstoke 2010
- Trust & Ethics in Finance, Globethics 2012
- zusammen mit Simona Beretta: Beyond the Financial Crisis: Towards a Christian Perspective for Action, Caritas in Veritate Foundation 2014
- Ethique et Responsabilité en Finance – Quo Vadis?, Editions Revue Banque Paris 2015
