= Ginwiłł coat of arms =

Polish coat of arms

Ginwiłł
- Alternative name: Ginwił
- Families: Ginwił, Ginwiłł, Korwin, Kulwieć, Kulwiocki, Piotrowski

Ginwiłł is a Polish coat of arms. It was used by several szlachta families in the times of the Polish–Lithuanian Commonwealth.

== Notable bearers ==
Notable bearers of this coat of arms include:

- Bartłomiej Ginwiłł (also Lithuanian: Ginvilas or Belarusian: Giniatowicz) Starost of Upytė

== See also ==
- Polish heraldry
- Heraldry
- Coat of arms
- List of Polish nobility coats of arms
