= Walenty Dembiński =

Former chancellor of Poland

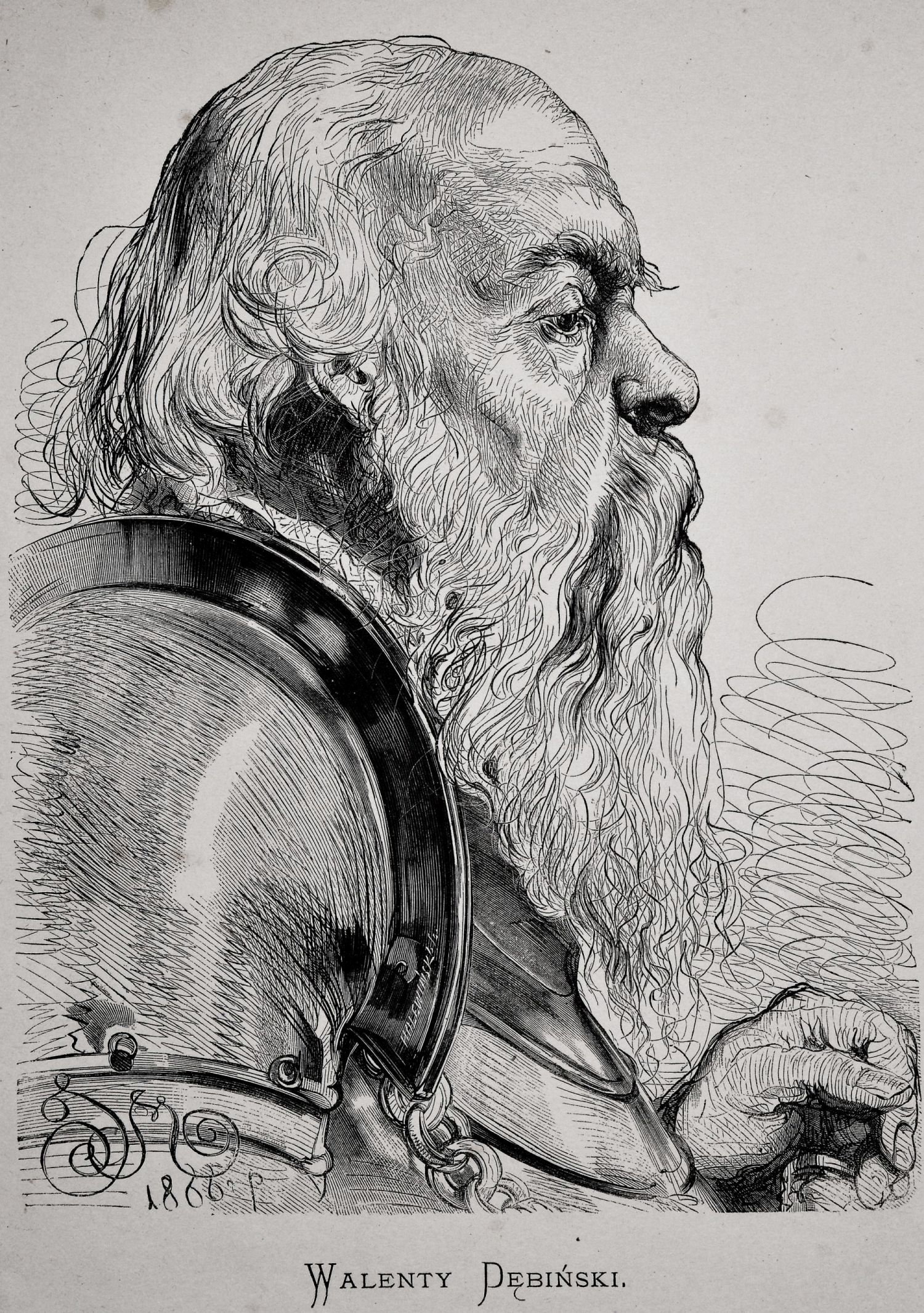
Walenty Dembiński as imagined by Jan Matejko, woodcut, 1876

Walenty Dembiński (died 1585) was a Polish statesman in the Kingdom of Poland within the Polish-Lithuanian Commonwealth who served as the Chancellor of Poland from 1564 to 1576. As Chancellor, Dembiński greatly contributed to the signing of the Union of Lublin in 1569.
