= Strutinsky =

Strutinsky (Ukrainian: Струтинский) is a Slavic masculine surname, its feminine counterpart is Strutinskaya. Alternate spellings include Strutynsky and Strutinski.

The surname may have its origin in the Western Ukrainian towns of Верхній Струтинь. See also Sas coat of arms. It may refer to:

- Galina Strutinskaya (born 1957), Russian chess player
- Vilen Strutinsky (1929–1993), Soviet nuclear physicist
