= Šilalė =

- Town
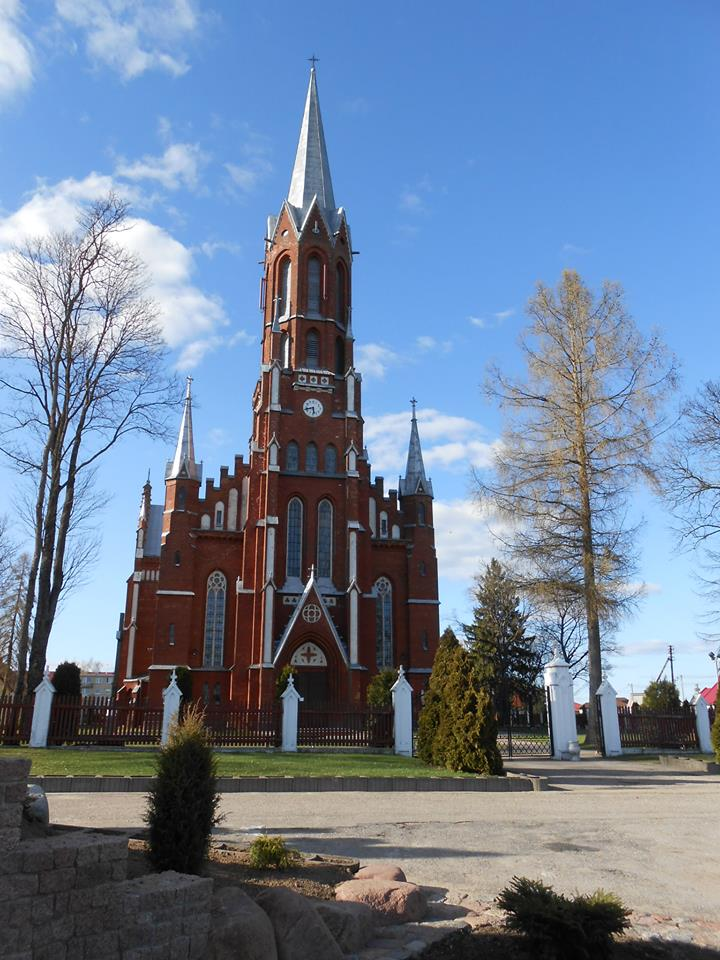
- Church of St. Francis of Assisi in Šilalė

- Flag Coat of arms

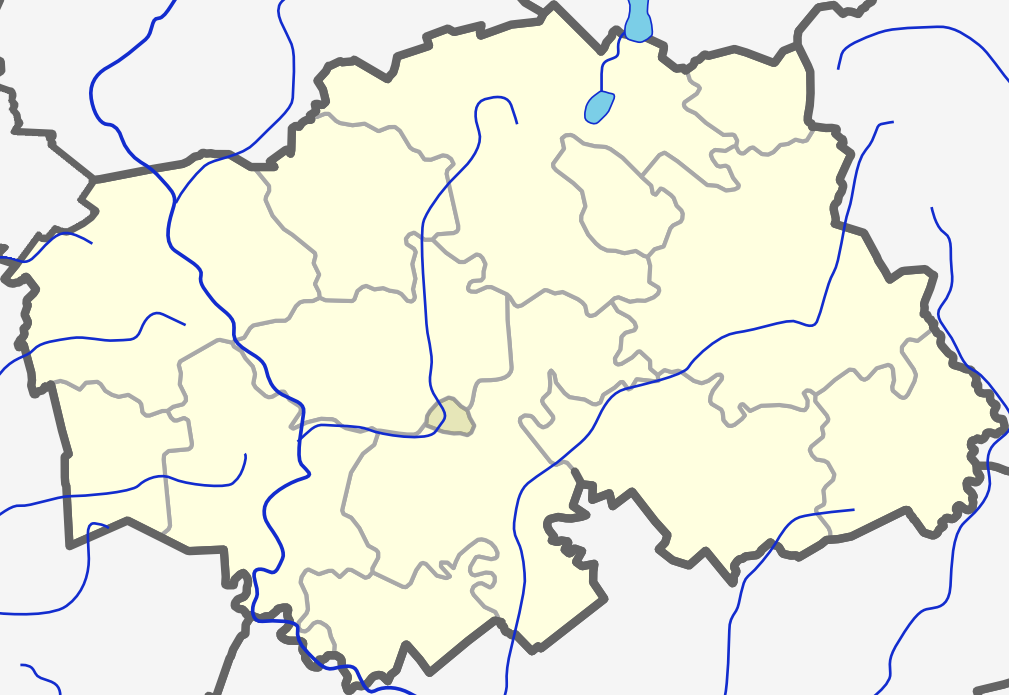
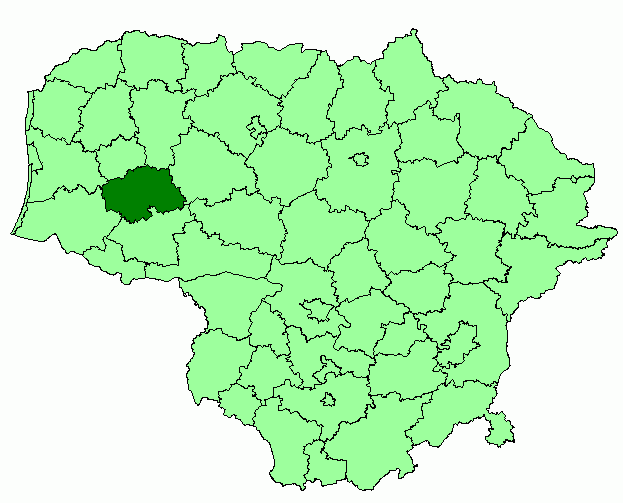
- Location in Šilalė district municipality Location of Šilalė district in Lithuania
- Coordinates: 55°29′N 22°11′E
- Country: Lithuania
- Ethnographic region: Samogitia
- County: Tauragė County
- Municipality: Šilalė district municipality
- Eldership: Šilalė city eldership
- Capital of: Šilalė district municipality Šilalė city eldership Šilalė rural eldership Traksėdžiai eldership
- First mentioned: 1533
- Granted town rights: 1950

Population (2020)
  - Total: 4,640
- Time zone: UTC+2 (EET)
  - Summer (DST): UTC+3 (EEST)

Šilalė (Samogitian: Šėlalė, Polish: Szyłele) is a city in western Lithuania, Samogitia, Tauragė County. It is located 30 km (19 mi) north of Tauragė. The River Lokysta flows through the town and there is a pond in the centre of the town.

== History ==
The town is part of the Samogitian ethnographic region of Lithuania and was first mentioned in the sixteenth century. Its name derives from the generic word sila ("Pinewood") and Samogitian suffix -alė. It was located in the Duchy of Samogitia in the Grand Duchy of Lithuania within the Polish–Lithuanian Commonwealth.

During World War II, the town was under Soviet occupation from 1940, and then under German occupation from 1941 to 1944. In July 1941, 135 Jewish men from Šilalė were shot on a site in the Jewish cemetery. In September 1941, the Jewish women and children of Šilalė were shot in the Tūbinės forest. Around 1,300 Jews were massacred by an Einsatzgruppen of Germans and local Lithuanian collaborators.

== Population ==
=== Ethnic composition ===
2021 — population of 4,729 people:

- Lithuanian — 99.03% (4683) people
- Russians — 0.38% (18) people
- Other — 0.59% (30) people

2011 – population of 5,492 people:

- Lithuanian – 99.02% (5438);
- Russian – 0.33% (18);
- Other – 0.66% (36).

2001 – population of 6,281 people:

- Lithuanian – 99.23% (6235);
- Russian – 0.37% (23);
- Other – 0.37% (23).

== Notable people ==
- Ferdinand Ignatius Piłsudski (c. 1670–c. 1719), Lithuanian nobleman, and a Colonel and Commander in the Samogitian division of the Grand Duchy of Lithuania.
- Franciszek Piłsudski (1713–1791) Lithuanian nobleman, Podczaszy (Deputy Cup Bearer) and member of the Sejm in the Polish–Lithuanian Commonwealth.
- Stasys Girėnas (1893–1933), Lithuanian–American pilot
- Lukas Lekavičius, professional basketball player
- Edvinas Gertmonas, professional football player
