= Zalavas =

- Village
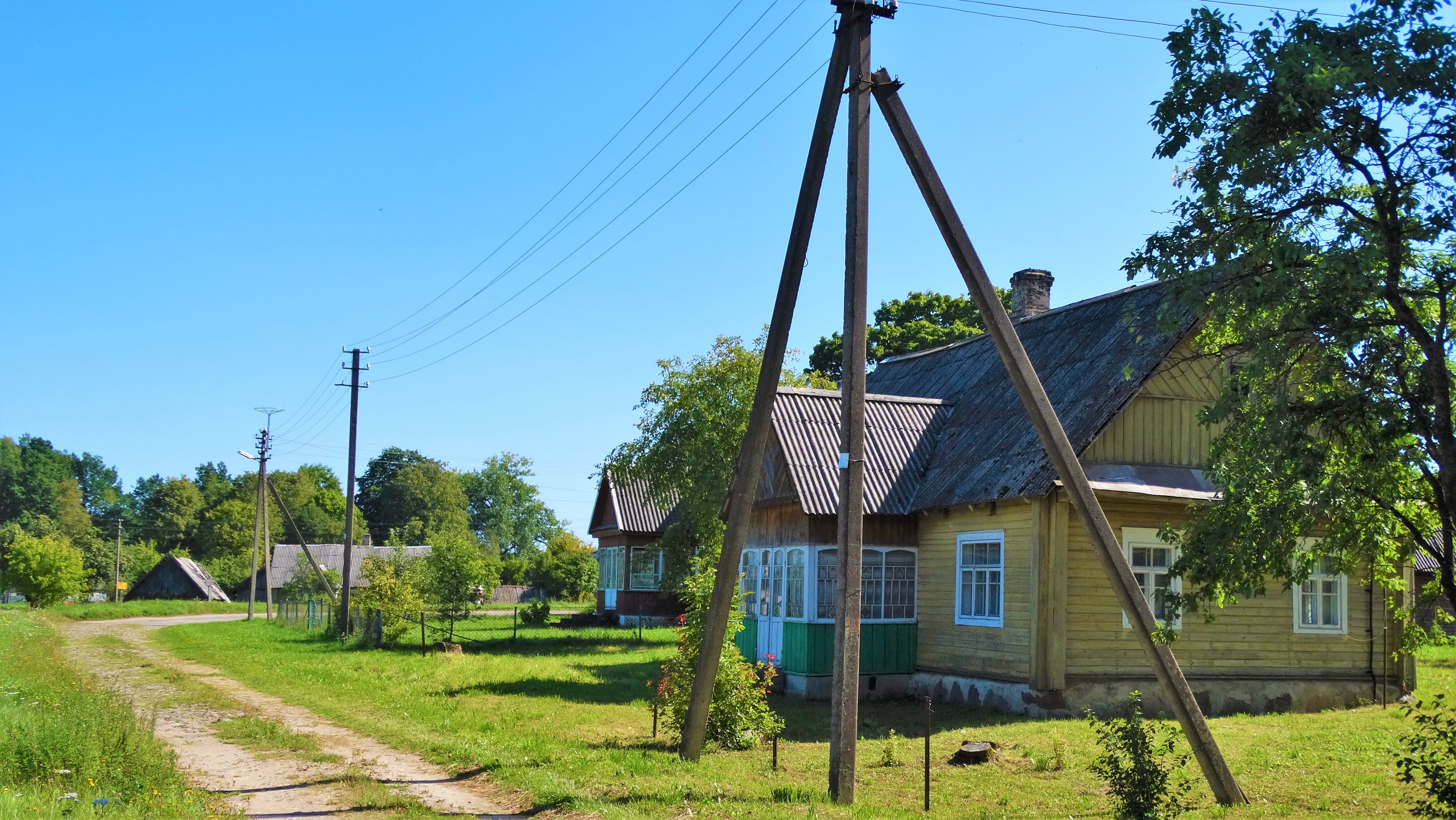
- Street in Zalavas
- Interactive map of Zalavas
- Location of Zalavas
- Coordinates: 54°58′N 25°58′E
- Country: Lithuania
- County: Vilnius County
- Municipality: Švenčionys district municipality
- Eldership: Pabradė eldership

Population (2011)
  - Total: 140
- Time zone: UTC+2 (EET)
  - Summer (DST): UTC+3 (EEST)

Zalavas (Polish: Zułowo, Belarusian: Зулаў, Zulaŭ) is a small village in Švenčionys district municipality, Lithuania. It is located on the Mera River near the Lithuanian state border with Belarus. According to the Lithuanian census of 2011, it had 140 residents. It is the birthplace of Marshal Józef Piłsudski, who later became Chief of State of Poland.

In 1920–1922 the village was located in the Republic of Central Lithuania, and then in Poland until 1939.

== History ==
=== Grand Duchy of Lithuania ===
The village's earliest known name is Miciūnai. At some later point, the name was changed to Zalavas (Polish: Zułów). The village was first mentioned in the late 17th century as the private property of Aleksander Wojna-Jasieniecki, a Castellan of Navahrudak. It then passed to the Giedraičiai princely family, and in the 18th century, the village was bought by the Rurikid Ogiński family, one of the notable magnate clans of the Grand Duchy of Lithuania.

=== Russian Empire ===
In the early 19th century the village was inherited by the Michałowskis. As part of the dowry of Helena Michałowska, it passed to her husband, Antoni Billewicz, who then bequeathed it to their daughter, Maria Billewiczówna. In 1863, after marrying Józef Wincenty Piłsudski, the village became the property of the Piłsudski family. It was in the manor house located near the village, called Zułów, that both of their sons were born, Bronisław Piłsudski, on November 2, 1866, and Józef Piłsudski, on December 5, 1867.

In July 1874, the local manor burned down and the family moved to Vilnius. Soon afterward, the family was forced to sell most of their property in Lithuania including Zalavas and nineteen other villages, to pay for legal expenses and fines for Bronisław, who was involved in an assassination attempt on the life of Tsar Alexander III of Russia. In 1882, the village was bought by Michał Ogiński, an heir to the Ogiński family, who had owned it in the 18th century. However, as the policies of Russification of the former lands of the Polish–Lithuanian Commonwealth forbade Poles from purchasing any real estate, he was forced to sell it to a Russian merchant from Riga named Klim. The latter sold the village to a certain imperial officer named Kuronosov, who divided the property, sold most of the forests, and was forced to abandon the area in 1915, during World War I.

=== German Empire ===
The Germans occupied the area in 1916, and most of the remaining forests were cut down.

=== Second Polish Republic ===
In 1920 following the Polish–Lithuanian War, the area became part of the Republic of Central Lithuania. In 1922, after a disputed election, Central Lithuania was annexed by the Second Polish Republic, and Zalavas was incorporated into the Wilno Voivodeship. Since Piłsudski's former property had belonged to a Russian official who abandoned it, it was nationalized, limited to the core of 65 hectares, and attached to a military base located nearby. In 1934, an association of veterans of the Polish–Soviet War purchased it from the army and a committee was created, whose aim was to rebuild the manor of Marshal Piłsudski, who had ecome regarded by many Poles as the country's national hero. The manor was reconstructed and officially opened to the public as a museum on October 10, 1937. However, it was destroyed by the Soviets shortly after the Invasion of Poland in 1939. An oak and a memorial stone still mark the location of the former manor.

=== Modern Lithuania ===
According to the Soviet–Lithuanian Mutual Assistance Treaty of 1939, Zalavas was returned to Lithuania.
