= Von Keudell =

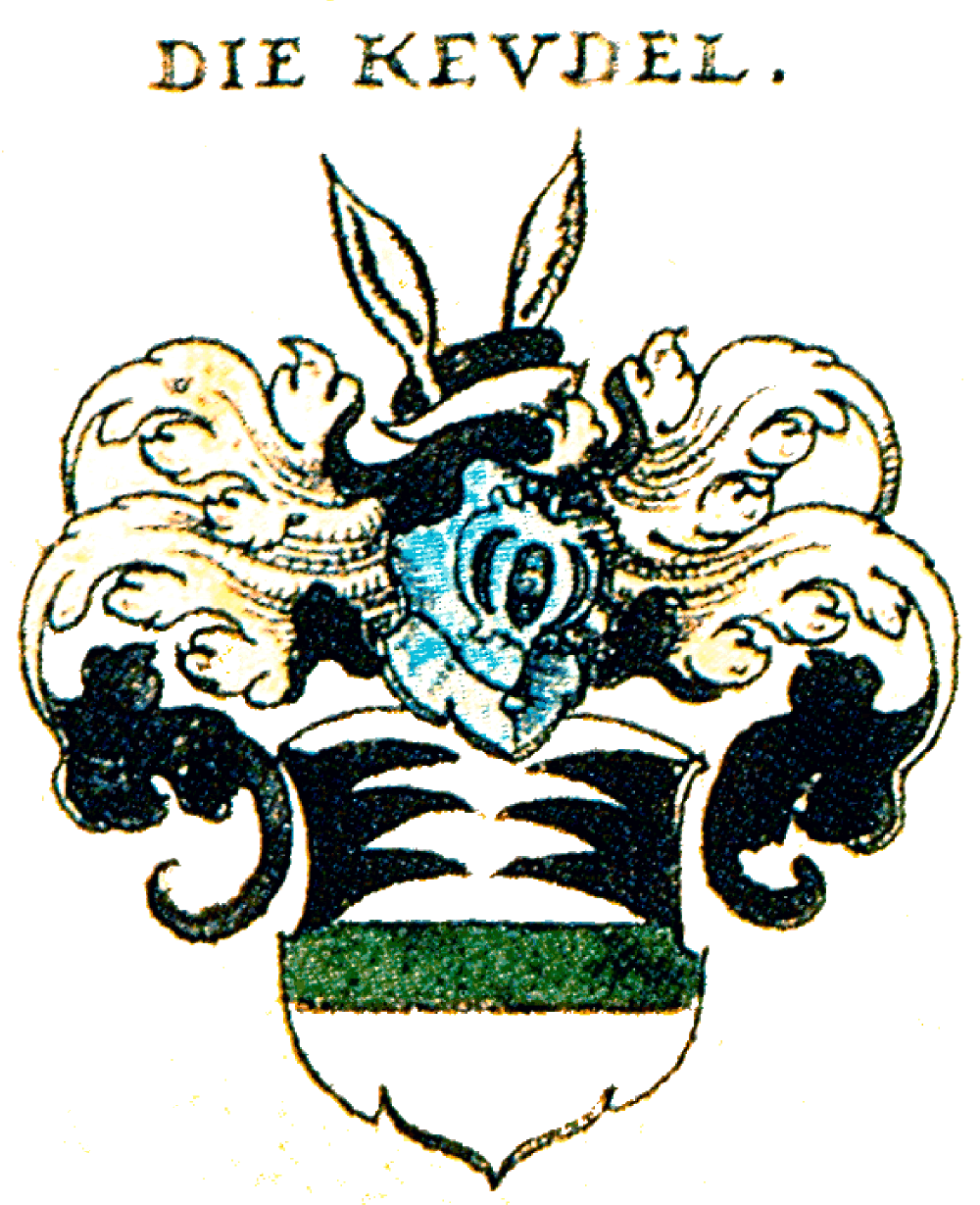
Coat of Arms of the Keudell family (1605)

The Von Keudell is the name of an old German noble family, originated in Hesse, Germany.

== History ==
The family first appeared in written documents in 1227 with Ritter Albertus Kedel, but the first known progenitor of this noble house was Rudolf Keudell zu Schwebda. The family consisted of several lines, elder line in Falken and younger ones in Schwenda and in Hildebrandshausen. Its members distinguished themselves as politicians, diplomats, artists and officers within the German Empire.

== Notable members ==
- Elsbeth von Keudell (1857–1953), German nurse
- Hans von Keudell (1892–1917), German military pilot
- Marie von Keudell (1838–1918), German painter
- Robert von Keudell (1824–1903), German diplomat
- Walter von Keudell (1884–1973), German politician
