= Jan Piłsudski =

Polish politician (1876–1950)

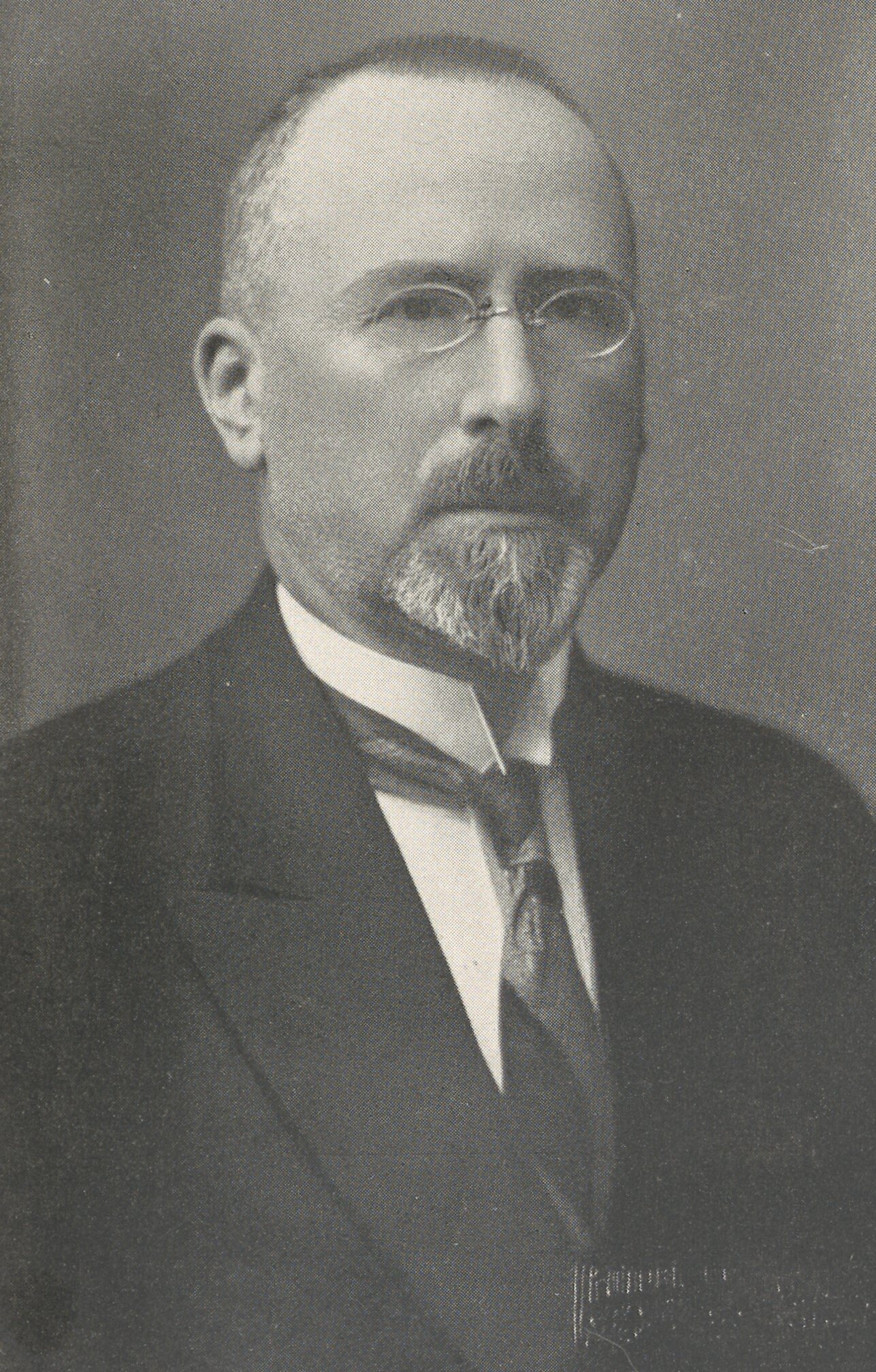
Jan Piłsudski

Jan Piłsudski (15 January 1876 – 21 December 1950), was a Polish politician and younger brother of Marshal Józef Piłsudski.

Like his famous brother, Piłsudski was born in Zalavas (Polish: Zułów), Lithuania, in what was then the Russian Empire.

He served in the Sejm of the Republic of Central Lithuania, and after its annexation to Poland in 1922, in various positions in the Polish government. He was Minister of Finance of Poland from 1931 to 1932.

As a result of the defeat following the Invasion of Poland by Nazi Germany in 1939, Piłsudski was forced to flee, but was arrested by the Soviet NKVD in Vilnius (Wilno). He was freed as a result of a prisoner exchange in 1941, and went to the United Kingdom where he died in exile in 1950 in Penley. He is buried in Wrexham, North East Wales, United Kingdom.
