= House of Piłsudski =

Polish noble family

Piłsudski coat of arms

The House of Piłsudski (Lithuanian: Pilsudskis, Pilsūdiškiai) is a family of nobility that originated in the Grand Duchy of Lithuania and whose notability increased under the Polish–Lithuanian Commonwealth and the Second Polish Republic.

The family was Polonized Lithuanian nobility that over time became part of the Polish nobility (szlachta); it has been called either a Polish noble family or a Polonized Lithuanian noble family. Its most famous member was Józef Piłsudski, described variously as a Pole or as Polonized-Lithuanian noble.

The Piłsudskis date back to pagan times in Lithuania and are recorded from the 13th century. In 1413, the family's name was polonized as Ginwiłłowicz.

The founder of the family is Giniotas Baltramiejus Pilsūdiškis, known from at least 1587. Pilsūdiškis' father was Giniotas Stonys, known from at least 1528, while Pilsūdiškis' grandfather was Rimša Giniotas.

In 1539, Baltramiejus Ginvilas (Polish: Bartłomiej Ginwiłł or Bartłomiej Giniatowicz), the Elder (Polish: Starost) of Upytė, added the name of his Pilsūdai estate in Samogitia to his surname. His Polonized name was Piłsudski-Ginejt-Rymsza. The Polonized surname of Baltramiejus' sons was Giniatowicz (Gięćtowicz), to which Piłsudski was added. Piłsudski was added to distinguish this family from the Giniotai and Giniotaičiai families.

A notable member of the family is Roch Mikołaj Piłsudski (c.1680 – early 18th century), Pantler of the Duchy of Samogitia. His marriage to Małgorzata Pancerzyńska—whose brother, Karol Pancerzyński, was Bishop of Vilnius—raised the wealth and prestige of the Piłsudski family.

The family also became related through several marriages to the Bilevičiai, another prominent and wealthy noble family.

In 1863, Józef Piłsudski, senior, married Maria Billewicz; one of their children, Józef Piłsudski the younger, would become the famous Polish hero and dictator, and the most celebrated member of the family. Józef Piłsudski's closest and most prominent relatives included his three brothers—Adam Piłsudski, a politician; Bronisław Piłsudski, a noted ethnographer; Jan Piłsudski, a lawyer and politician—and his daughters: Wanda Piłsudska, who remained in England after World War II, practicing psychiatry, then in 1990 returned permanently to Poland, where she died in 2001 and Jadwiga Piłsudska, who was a ferry pilot during World War II.

The last remaining male member of Józef Piłsudski's family, Kazuyasu Kimura, died on 14 December 2022 at the age of 70. He was a grandson of Bronisław Piłsudski, Józef's older brother who married an Ainu woman and lived in Sakhalin.

== See also ==
- Piłsudski coat of arms
- Bronisław Piłsudski (1866–1918)
- Józef Piłsudski
- Wanda Piłsudska
- Jadwiga Piłsudska
- Jan Chryzostom Piłsudski (1760-1837)
