= Adam Piłsudski =

Polish politician (1869–1935)

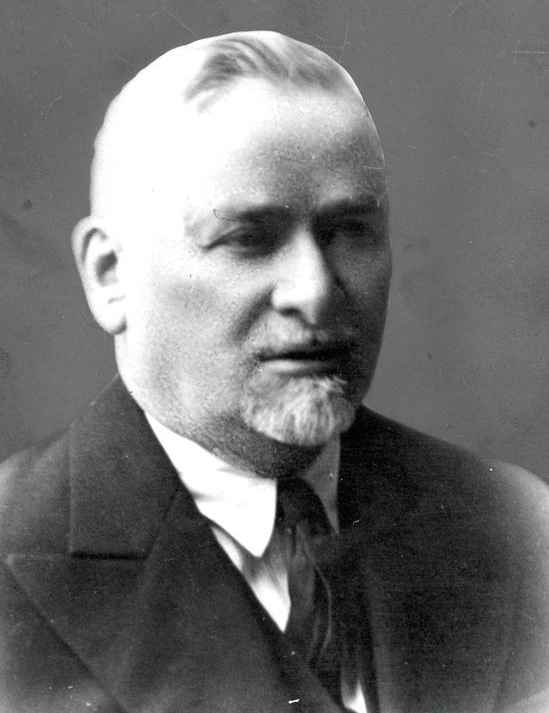
Adam Piłsudski

Adam Piłsudski (Zalavas, 25 September 1869 - 16 December 1935) was a member of the Senate of Poland, vice president of Wilno, brother of the famous Józef Piłsudski. He was honored with the Officer's Cross of the Order of Polonia Restituta.
