= Šakiai District Municipality =

Coordinates: 54°56′06″N 23°06′04″E

Šakiai District Municipality Šakių rajono savivaldybė
- Municipality
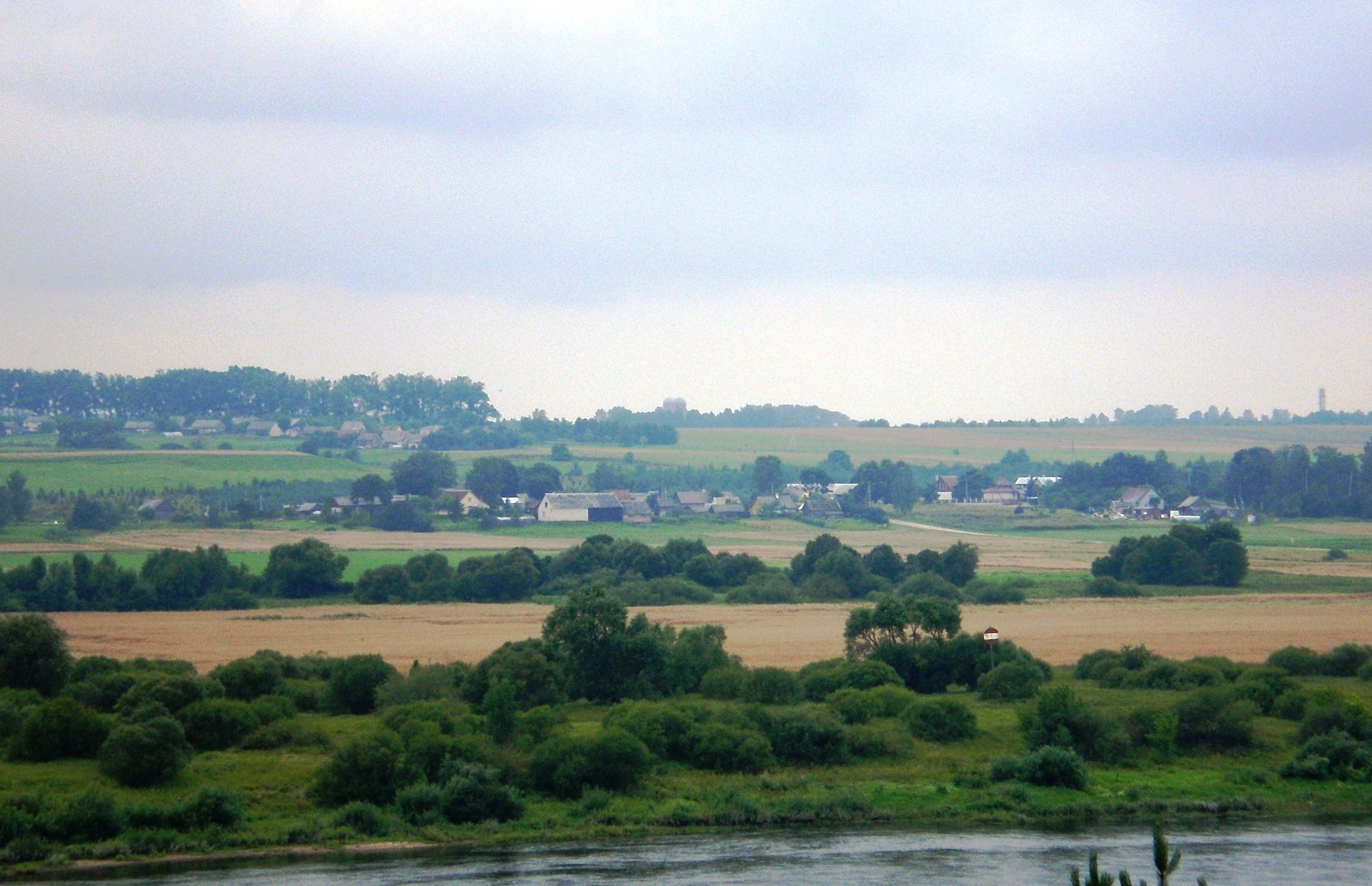
- Landscape near Mikytai

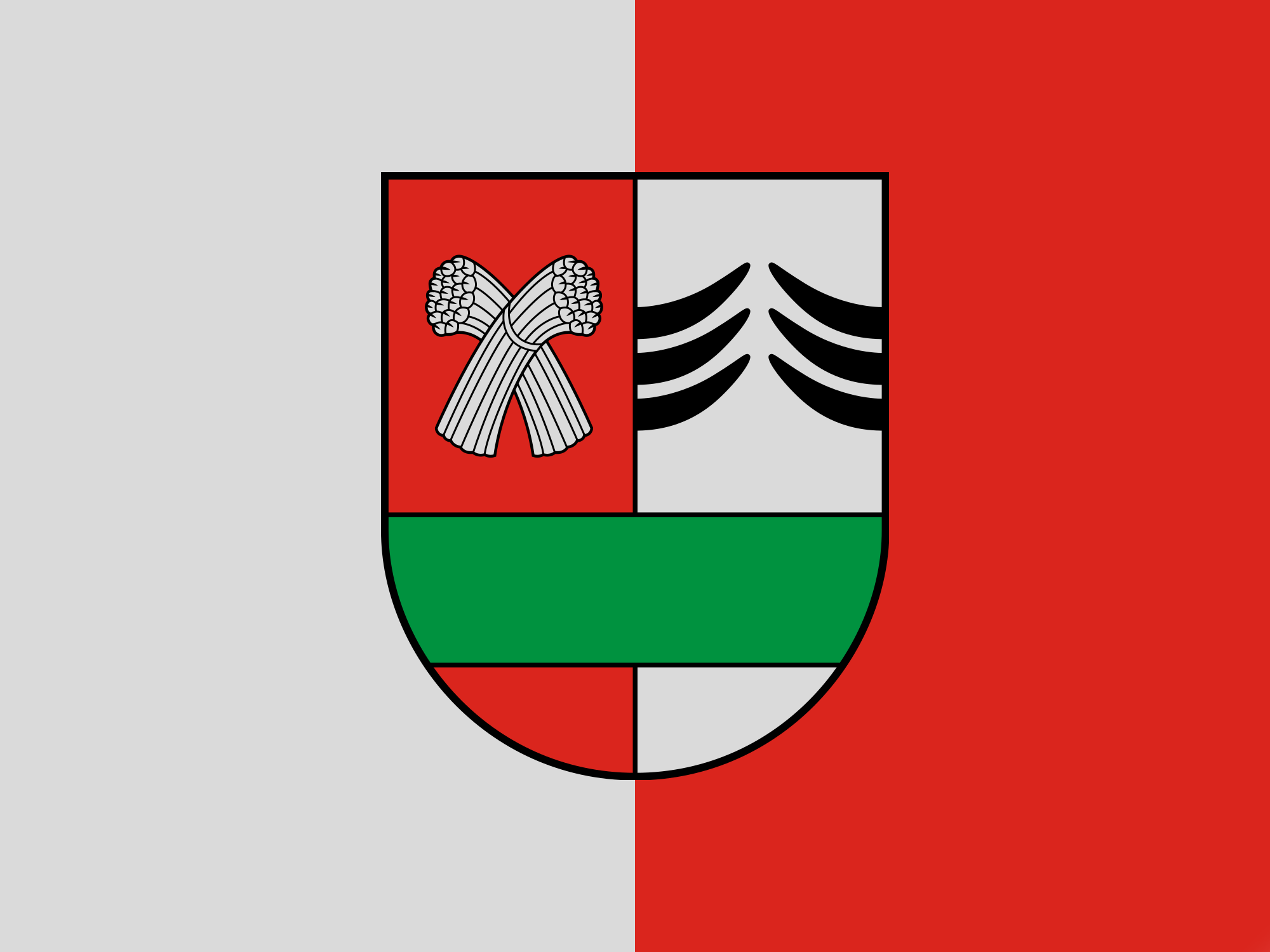
- Flag Coat of arms Brandmark

- Location of Šakiai district municipality within Lithuania

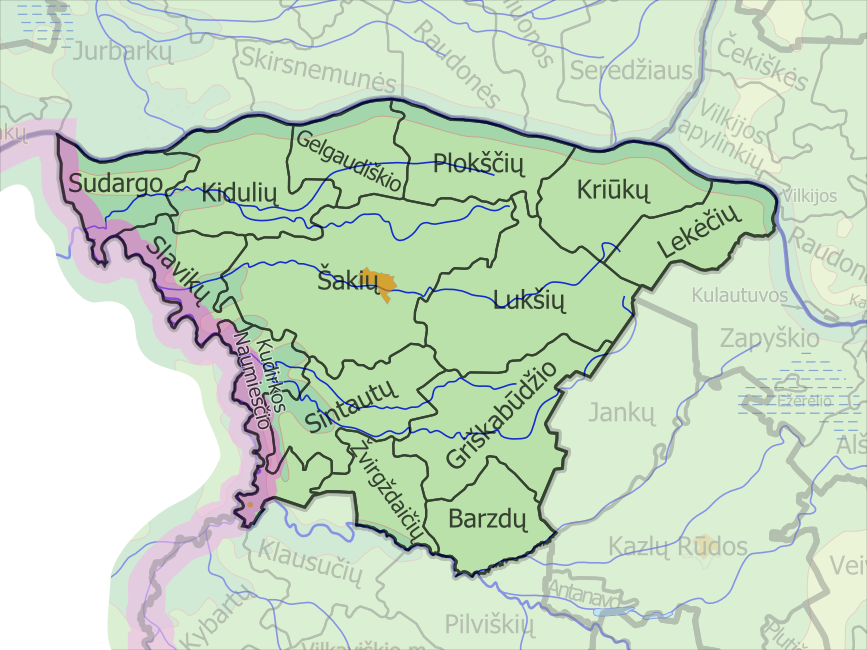
- Map of Šakiai district municipality
- Country: Lithuania
- Ethnographic region: Suvalkija
- County: Marijampolė County
- Capital: Šakiai
- Elderships: 14

Area
  - Total: 1,453 km^{2} (561 sq mi)
  - Rank: 17th

Population (2021)
  - Total: 26,931
  - Rank: 29th
  - Density: 18.53/km^{2} (48.00/sq mi)
  - Rank: 39-40th
- Time zone: UTC+2 (EET)
  - Summer (DST): UTC+3 (EEST)
- Telephone code: 345
- Major settlements: Šakiai (pop. 4,998); Gelgaudiškis (pop. 1,557); Kudirkos Naumiestis (pop. 1,480)
- Website: www.sakiai.lt

Šakiai District Municipality is one of 60 municipalities in Lithuania.

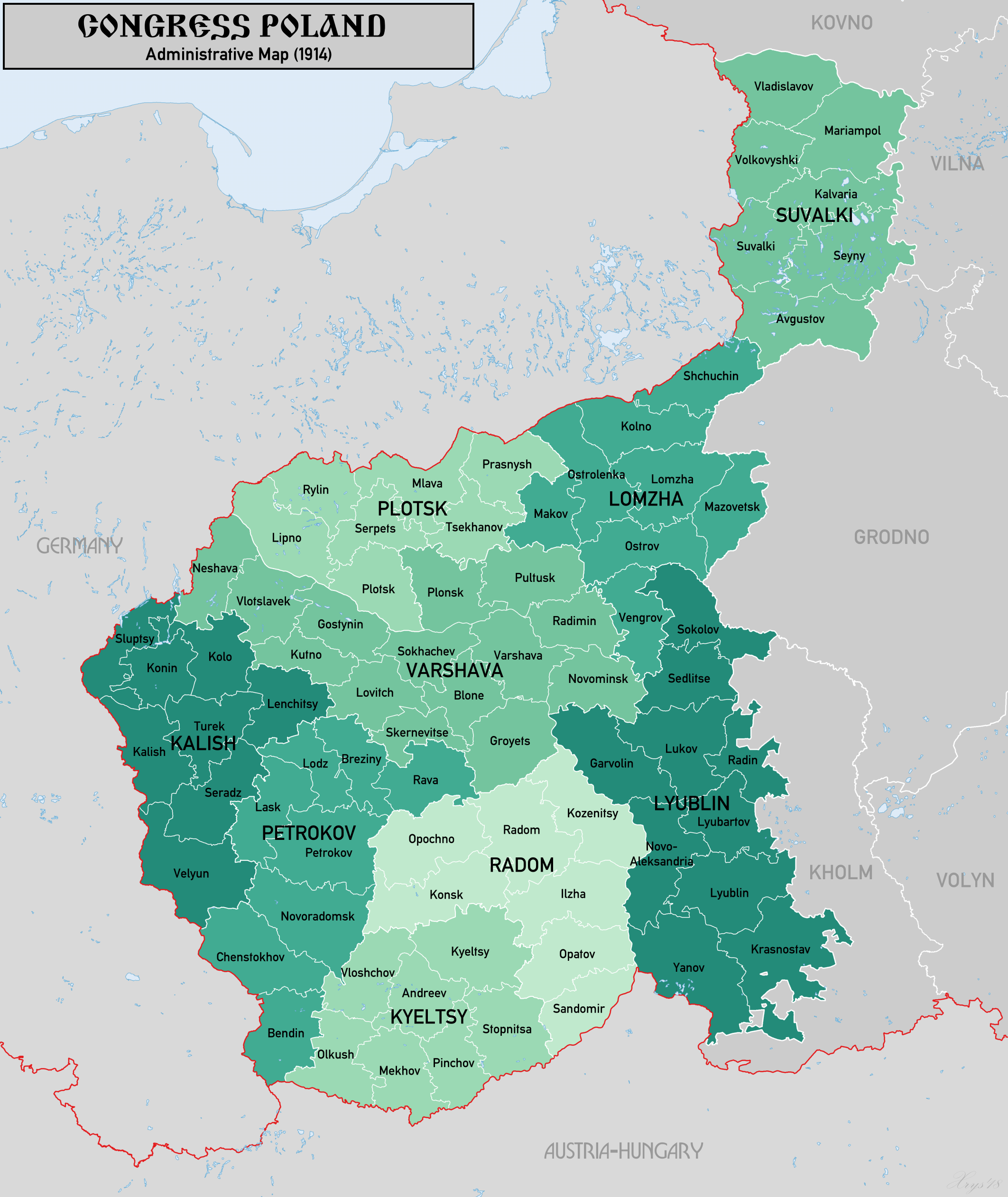
Congress Poland in 1914 with Vladislavov at the top
