= Jerzy Szwajcer =

Polish artist

Jerzy Szwajcer "Jotys" (1892 in Warsaw – 1967) was a Polish artist. He studied and debuted in Brussels and contributed to many magazines in Poland and abroad. His work has been published many albums on portrait caricature; one of the most famous portrait caricaturists in Poland . He wrote two books: Diary of a Caricaturist (Z pamiętnika karykaturzysty, 1926) and The Caricaturist's Eye (Okiem karykaturzysty, 1930).
