= Pavoverė =

Village in Lithuania

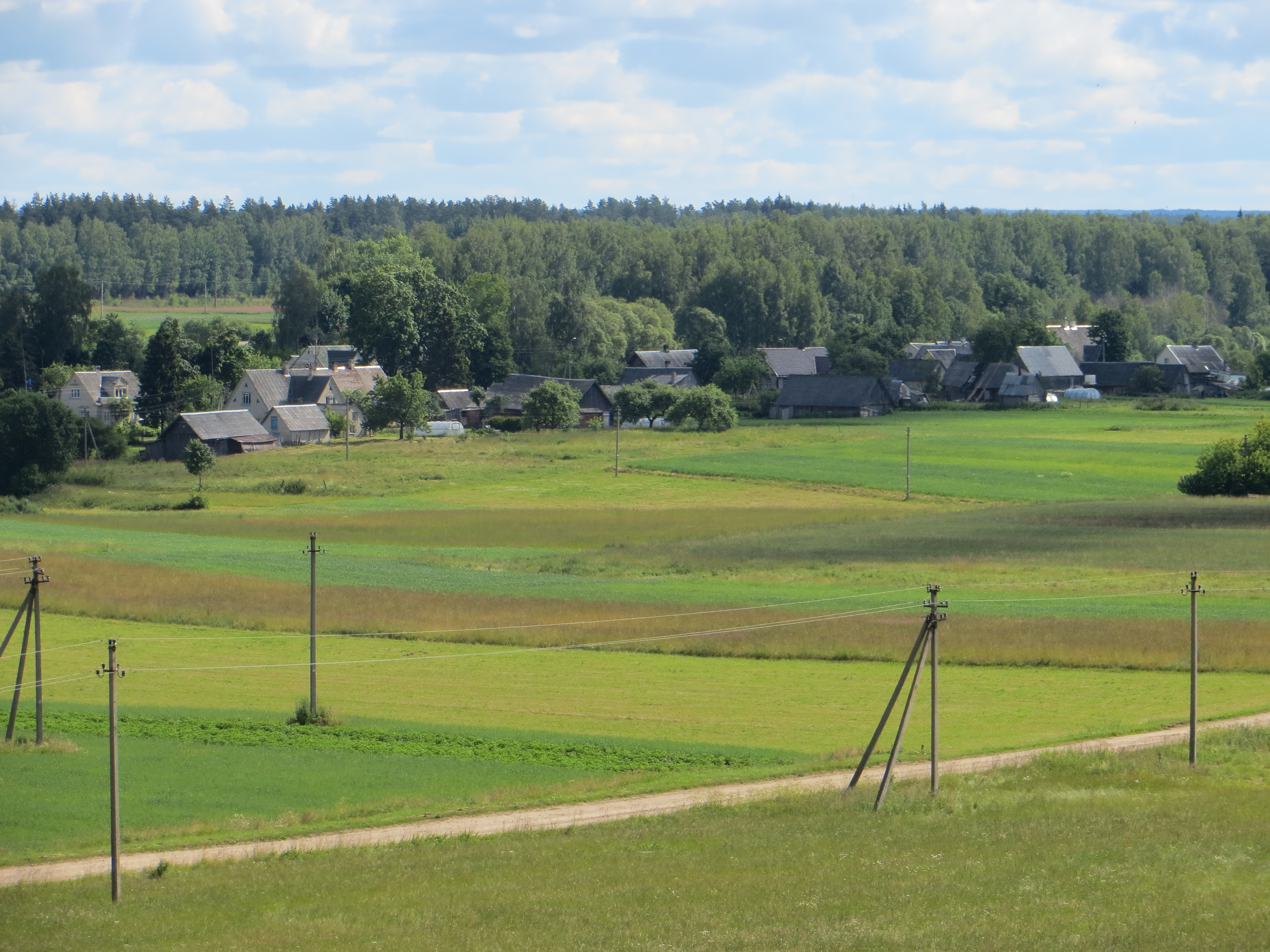
View of the village from the south

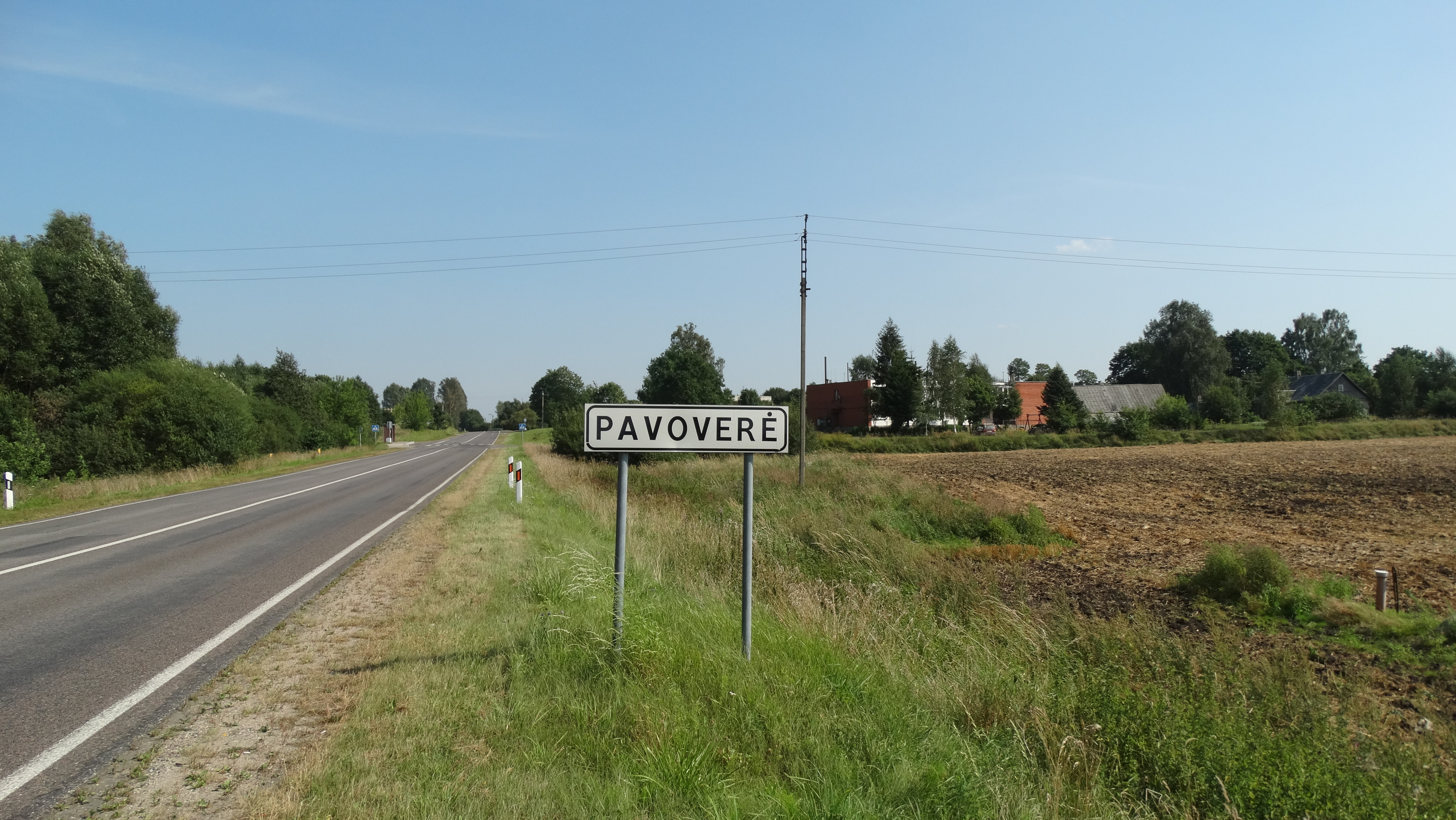
Boundary mark

Pavoverė is a village in the Švenčionys District Municipality, Lithuania. It is located 4 kilometres (2.5 mi) east of Pabradė, near the road KK102 that links Vilnius–Švenčionys–Zarasai. It is an administrative center of Pavoverė Eldership. There is the wooden St. Casimir Church (built in 1775), a library (since 1947), an agricultural company, and a medical station.

Voveraitė, the left tributary of the Žeimena, flows north of the village. Baliuliai hillfort (1st–2nd century BC) and burial mounds (5th–6th century) are located 4 kilometres (2.5 mi) east of Pavoverė.

== Etymology ==
In the 18th century, the Pavoverė Manor belonged to the landowners Sorokas, therefore it was known as Sarokpolis (a toponym derived from the manorial place, which is now used for a village is now located east of Pavoverė). In the 20th century, the name Pavoverė became popular after the Voveraitė (lit. 'chanterelle') stream flowing through the village (a water-named place name).

== History ==
On 1 July 1812, the Battle of Pavoverė between the French Grande Armée and the Imperial Russian Army took place near the village.

In 1916, the German Empire built the Pabradė–Lentupys railway through Pavoverė. Pavoverė railway station operated until the early 21st century.
