= George Sanford (political scientist) =

British political scientist (died 2021)

George Sanford (1942/3 – 25 February 2021) was a professor of politics at the University of Bristol, England. He specialised in Polish and East European studies. In particular, he is considered an expert on the Katyn massacre, and published a book on that topic in 2005. On several occasions he was interviewed on Polish affairs in the mass media. He was a Labour candidate for the parliamentary seat of Dorset West in1970. He came second.

He died on 25 February 2021 at the age of 78.

== Publications ==
George Sanford has published several books and numerous articles and books chapters. His book publications include:

- Polish Communism in Crisis, 1983
- Military Rule in Poland: The Rebuilding of Communist Power, 1981-1983, 1986
- The Solidarity Congress 1981: The Great Debate, 1990
- Democratization in Poland, 1988-1990: Polish Voices, 1992
- Building Democracy?: The International Dimension of Democratisation in Eastern Europe (ed.), 1994
- Historical Dictionary of Poland, 1994
- Poland: The Conquest of History, 1999
- Democratic Government in Poland : Constitutional Politics Since 1989, 2002
- Katyn and the Soviet Massacre of 1940: Truth, Justice and Memory, 2005
