= Nicole Jordan =

American novelist

- Born: Anne Bushyhead; 1954 (age 71–72); Oklahoma, U.S.
- Education: Georgia Tech
- Occupation: Author
- Writing career
- Genres: Romance; historical romance
- Website: nicolejordanauthor.com

Nicole Jordan (born Anne Bushyhead; 1954) is an American author of romance novels. Jordan's historical romances have appeared on best-seller lists, including the New York Times, USA Today, Waldenbooks, and Amazon.com. She has been a finalist for the Romance Writers of America RITA Award and a runner-up for RWA's Favorite Book of the Year. Jordan has won the Dorothy Parker Award of Excellence for best historical. Jay Leno pretended to read aloud her novel Touch Me With Fire during a skit on The Tonight Show.

== Biography ==
Nicole Jordan was born in Oklahoma. Her father was in the US Army, so the family moved frequently. She graduated from high school in Germany. She credits her mother with instilling her love of romance novels, as she began reading aloud to her from Pride and Prejudice and The Scarlet Pimpernel when Jordan was ten years old. Before long, she was reading Victoria Holt and Mary Stewart romances.

Jordan earned a degree in civil engineering from Georgia Tech. She then spent eight years working as a manufacturing manager for Procter & Gamble making disposable diapers and toilet tissue. After reading the novel Tears of Gold by Laurie McBain, Jordan began dreaming of writing her own stories. After attending a goal-setting workshop with the theme "Do it now -- don't wait until you're too old to explore your dreams," Jordan went home and began writing one of her ideas down in long-hand. After four years of part-time writing and editing and many rejections, Zebra books purchased this first story in 1985.

Jordan and her husband moved from Atlanta to Utah. She owns a horse, Irish Outlaw, which is an Irish Thoroughbred. Jordan often competes with him in shows. Jordan has no children.

== Bibliography ==
- TOUCH ME WITH FIRE, Ballantine Books, Dec 06 (Reprint), Regency England, ISBN 0-8041-1987-2
- FEVER DREAMS, Ballantine Books, May 6, Paradise Series Book 4, ISBN 0-345-46787-6
- WICKED FANTASY, Ballantine Books, Aug 05, Paradise Series Book 3, ISBN 0-345-46786-8
- THE WARRIOR, Ballantine Books, Jul 05 (Updated Reissue), Scottish Highlands, ISBN 0-8041-1986-4
- LORD OF SEDUCTION, Ballantine Books, Dec 04, Paradise Series Book 2, ISBN 0-345-46785-X
- THE LOVER, Ballantine Books, Apr 04 (Updated Reissue), Scottish Highlands 1740, ISBN 0-8041-1985-6
- MASTER OF TEMPTATION, Ballantine Books, May 4, Paradise Series Book 1, ISBN 0-8041-1981-3
- THE PRINCE OF PLEASURE, Ballantine/Ivy, Jul 03, Notorious Series Book 5, Regency England, ISBN 0-8041-1980-5
- ECSTASY, Ballantine/Ivy, Oct 02, Notorious Series Book 4, Regency England, ISBN 0-8041-1979-1
- DESIRE, Ballantine/Ivy, Nov 01, Notorious Series Book 3, Regency England, ISBN 0-449-00486-4
- THE PASSION, Ballantine/Ivy, Nov 00, Notorious Series Book 2, Regency England, ISBN 0-449-00485-6
- THE SEDUCTION, Ballantine/Ivy, May 00, Notorious Series Book 1, Regency England, ISBN 0-449-00484-8
- THE HEART BREAKER, Avon Books, Feb 98, Rocky Mountain Trilogy Book II, Colorado 1887, ISBN 0-380-78561-7
- THE LOVER, Avon Books, Mar 97, Scottish Highlands 1740, ISBN 0-380-78560-9
- THE OUTLAW, Avon Books, Mar 96, Rocky Mountain Trilogy Book I, Colorado 1886, ISBN 0-380-77832-7
- THE WARRIOR, Avon Books, Mar 95, Medieval England 1155, ISBN 0-380-77831-9
- THE SAVAGE, Avon Books, Jul 94, Indian/Texas 1865, ISBN 0-380-77280-9
- TOUCH ME WITH FIRE, Avon Books, Dec 93, Regency England, ISBN 0-380-77279-5
- WILDSTAR, Avon Books, Dec 92, Colorado 1880s, ISBN 0-380-76622-1
- LORD OF DESIRE, Avon Books, Jan 92, Desert Sheik, Algeria, ISBN 0-380-76621-3
- TENDER FEUD, Harlequin Hist #97, Oct 91, Scottish Highlands 1760s, ISBN 0-373-28697-X
- MOONWITCH, Harlequin Hist #62, Jan 91, Caribbean/Natchez, Miss 1818, ISBN 0-373-28662-7
- DESIRE AND DECEPTION, Zebra Heartfire, Aug 88, Regency England/New Orleans, ISBN 0-8217-2442-8
- VELVET EMBRACE, Zebra Heartfire, Jun 87, Regency England, ISBN 978-0-8217-2108-7
