= Act on the protection of the name of Józef Piłsudski =

Repealed Polish law

- Long title: Act of 7 April 1938 on the Protection of the Name of Józef Piłsudski, First Marshal of Poland
- Territorial extent: Poland
- Passed: 7 April 1938
- Effective: 13 April 1938
- Repealed: 1 January 1970
- Administered by: Minister of Justice

Summary
- Protection of the name of Józef Piłsudski
- Status: Repealed

The Act on the protection of the name of Józef Piłsudski was a law passed on 7 April 1938 to protect the name of Józef Piłsudski, First Marshal of Poland, enacted to prevent violations of his reputation.

It was one of the manifestations of the cult of personality surrounding the deceased marshal and Chief of State, and one of only two Polish legal acts protecting the honor of a named individual (alongside the Act on the Protection of the Legacy of Fryderyk Chopin of 2001).

== Background ==
The basis for the enactment of this law was the so-called "Cywiński affair". Stanisław Cywiński, in a review of Melchior Wańkowicz's propaganda book COP – ognisko siły, published on 30 January 1938 in the National Democracy-aligned Dziennik Wileński, included the following statements:

Wańkowicz [...] provides a series of vivid sketches of what he saw, and what he did not see but is supposed to emerge soon in this heart of Poland, refuting the words of a certain buffoon who used to say about Poland that it is like an obwarzanek: only what is at the edges is worth something, while the center is empty.

This review was approved by the censorship office, specifically by Marian Jasiński, head of the Socio-Political Department of the Vilnius Voivodeship Office. It was not until an anonymous article on 13 February 1938 in the biweekly Naród i Państwo (the press organ of the Union for the Reform of the Republic), titled The Filth of Words, ambiguously suggested that Cywiński had insulted Józef Piłsudski by using the term "buffoon".

The article reached General Stefan Dąb-Biernacki, the army inspector in Vilnius, who tasked senior officers (majors and colonels) with beating the journalists responsible for the review. On the evening of 14 February 1938, three groups of officers visited the homes of Cywiński, Aleksander Zwierzyński (editor-in-chief of Dziennik Wileński), and Zygmunt Fedorowicz (deputy editor-in-chief). All three were assaulted. Cywiński was knocked to the floor in his apartment, beaten, and kicked until he fainted. Fedorowicz and Zwierzyński, not found at home, were later attacked at the newspaper's editorial office. Other Dziennik Wileński staff members were also beaten.

Shortly afterward, the editorial offices were seized by the State Police. The police arrested Cywiński, Zwierzyński, and Fedorowicz. Cywiński and Zwierzyński were charged with insulting the Polish Nation by using derogatory language to describe Marshal Józef Piłsudski. Fedorowicz was released. Protests erupted in Vilnius in defense of the arrested and previously assaulted editors of Dziennik Wileński.

== Parliamentary work on the draft law ==
The issue of the insult to the Marshal quickly reached the Sejm. On 17 February 1938, MP Wanda Pełczyńska from the Vilnius constituency submitted an interpellation to the government, condemning the youth protests in Vilnius against the army and asking what the government intended to do "to provide redress for the deeply offended feelings not only of all of Vilnius but of all citizens of the Polish state, for whom Józef Piłsudski will forever remain the untouchable personification of Poland's greatness and dignity".

A debate on the Vilnius incidents also took place in the Senate. On 7 March 1938, Senator Władysław Malski stated:

'[...] The honor of service compels us to react regardless of who, where, or how they insult the Commander's name. It does not matter whether they beat more or less [...] we will react regardless of whether the judiciary acts efficiently or not. Our hearts and soldierly honor compel us to react immediately.

Senator Tadeusz Petrażycki argued:

Vigilantism, this primitive form of justice, in the 20th century undermines authority, undermines the rule of law, and sows anarchy in the state [...]. Those who insulted the Marshal's memory are on trial. I am certain that the military authorities will take the consequences prescribed by law [...] against those who took the path of vigilantism.

The government acted swiftly, and on 15 March 1938, it submitted to the Sejm the draft of the Act on the protection of the name of Józef Piłsudski, First Marshal of Poland. Deputy Marshal of the Sejm Bohdan Podoski requested that MPs, due to the simplicity and clarity of the draft, forgo sending it to a committee (a legal requirement) and proceed with its immediate consideration. This request was granted. The rapporteur, MP Bolesław Świdziński, presented the act, stating:

It might seem that no law is needed in Poland to protect the name of Józef Piłsudski [...] his name must be under special protection. This is all the more necessary because there are still prejudices, even hatreds, of small-minded people who, not understanding Józef Piłsudski, [...] dare to insult the feelings of the entire nation.

During the Sejm debate, MP Michał Wymysłowski proposed increasing the penalty for violating the act to 15 years of imprisonment. Deputy Marshal of the Sejm Tadeusz Schaetzel refused to consider this proposal. The Sejm unanimously adopted the government's draft in the first and second readings. On 17 March, the Senate's legal committee unanimously approved the draft. On 23 March 1938, the Senate debated and adopted the act during a plenary session. During this session, Prime Minister Felicjan Sławoj Składkowski spoke:

When we study the lives and deeds of ancient heroes, we often learn that they were loved by all, that no one dared to oppose the greatness of their name. This is not true. We know that when knights raised a future king or leader on their shields, each held a double-edged sword in their right hand to punish those who dared to challenge the majesty or oppose the lord's name. High Chamber! This act is the shield on which the entire Polish Nation raises the Name of Józef Piłsudski high toward the sun and eternal glory.

The president signed the act on 7 April 1938, completing the legislative process. It only required publication in Dziennik Ustaw, which occurred on 13 April 1938.

== Content of the act ==
The act was brief, consisting of four articles:

Art. 1.

The memory of the deeds and merits of JÓZEF PIŁSUDSKI – the Resurrector of Homeland Independence and Educator of the Nation – belongs forever to the treasury of the national spirit and remains under the special protection of the law.

Art. 2.

Whoever insults the Name of JÓZEF PIŁSUDSKI shall be subject to imprisonment for up to 5 years.

Art. 3.

The execution of this act is entrusted to the Minister of Justice.

Art. 4.

This act enters into force on the day of its publication.

== Application of the act ==
The act took effect on 13 April 1938, but it could not be applied to Stanisław Cywiński, whose statement prompted its enactment. Under the principle of lex retro non agit – the law does not apply retroactively – expressed in Art. 1 of the then-current Penal Code, Cywiński could only be judged under the laws in effect at the time of the offense. He was sentenced to the maximum allowable penalty of three years' imprisonment. The Court of Appeal reduced this to 18 months, of which he served only 5 months, including a three-month detention period, as he was released pending the cassation appeal to the Supreme Court. The Supreme Court dismissed the appeal on 5 April 1939, but Cywiński did not return to prison.

Due to the short duration of the act's enforcement, few examples of its application are noted in the literature. Kurier Warszawski, which maintained an extensive court chronicle at the time, reported only one trial using this act. The case was heard before the district court in Toruń against Zygmunt Felczak, editor of Obrona Ludu, the press organ of the Labour Party, and Kazimierz Klimczak, its illustrator. They were tried for an article and cartoon titled Two Populists at the President of the Republic, allegedly insulting Piłsudski and Ignacy Mościcki. The court convicted both, sentencing the editor to 18 months and the illustrator to 8 months. An aggravating factor was that the offense occurred on the anniversary of President Ignacy Mościcki's inauguration.

== Subsequent fate of the act ==
Due to the rapid outbreak of World War II, the act's effective application period was short. After the war, with the communists (Polish Workers' Party, later Polish United Workers' Party) taking power in Poland, the act was no longer enforced, though formally, insulting the name of Józef Piłsudski remained a prosecutable offense. The act was officially repealed with the entry into force of the Penal Code of 1969 on 1 January 1970. The introductory provisions of that code, in Art. V § 1, repealed pre-5 September 1939 special laws and other acts with legal force containing criminal liability provisions, including this act.
