= Ryc coat of arms =

Polish coat of arms

Ryc
- Families: 2 names altogether: Ryc, Rydz

Ryc is a Polish coat of arms. It was used by the Ryc and Rydz szlachta families.

== Blazon ==
The Coat of arms Ryc is a Coat of arms of Wieniawa variation.

== Notable bearers ==
Notable bearers of this coat of arms include:

- Edward Rydz-Śmigły, Inspector General of the Armed Forces of Poland

== Gallery ==
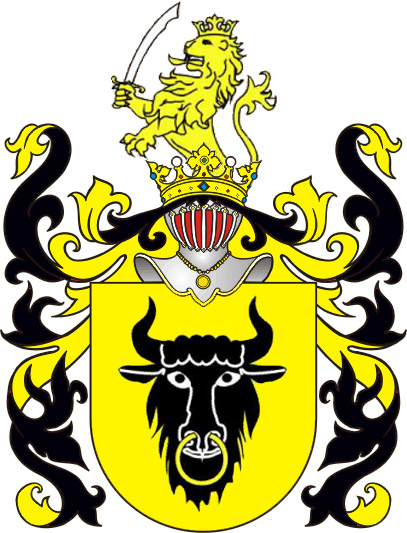
The Coat of arms of Ryc is considered a variation of the Coat of arms of Wieniawa

== See also ==
- Polish heraldry
- Heraldic family
- List of Polish nobility coats of arms

== Bibliography ==
- Juliusz Karol Ostrowski: Księga herbowa rodów polskich. Warszawa, 1897–1906.
