= Józef Piłsudski's cult of personality =

Cult of personality surrounding Józef Piłsudski

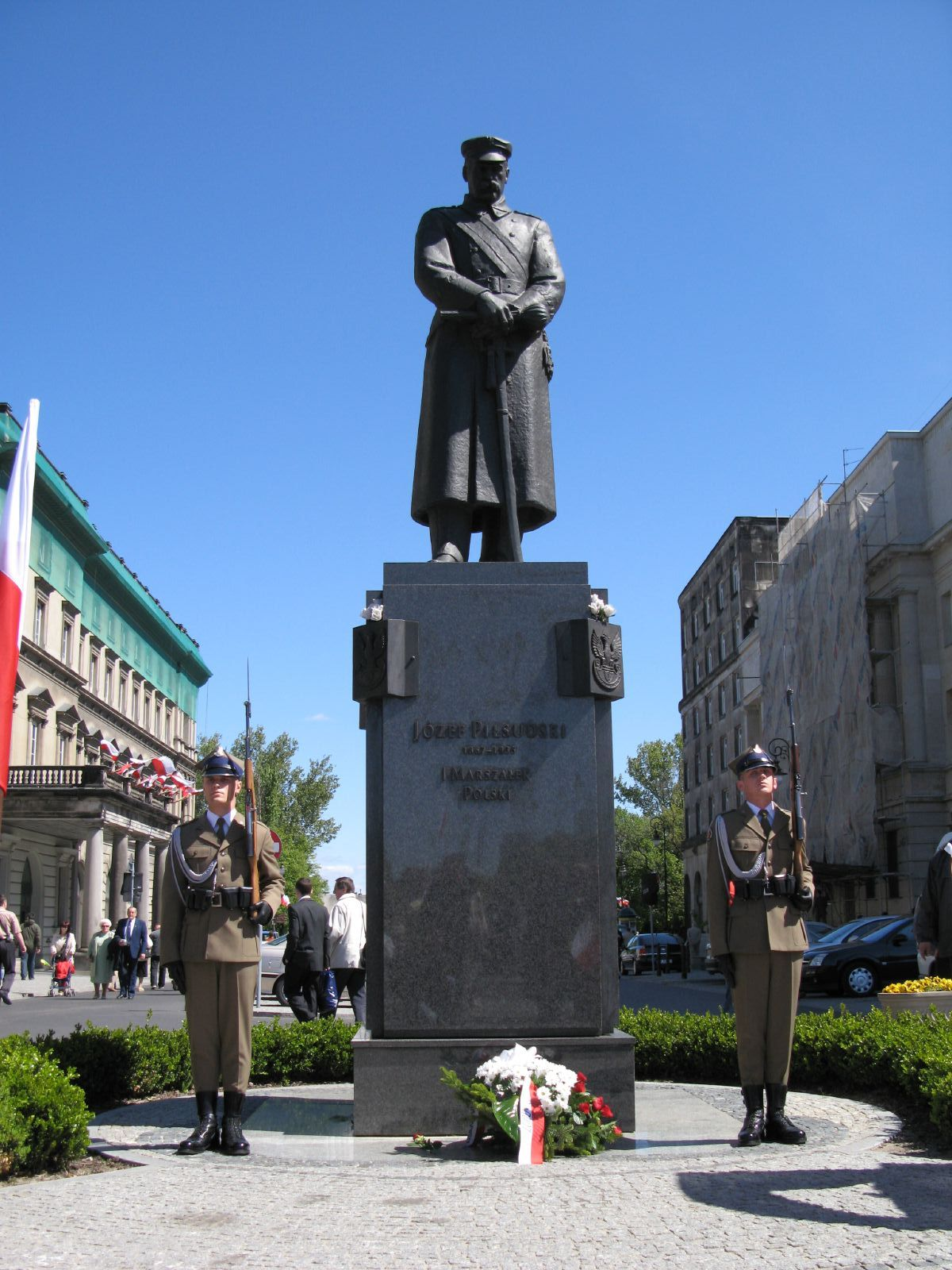
Piłsudski statue, Piłsudski Square, Warsaw

In the interwar period a cult of personality developed around the Polish military commander and politician Józef Piłsudski, which has continued ever since.

Initially it was encouraged by propaganda which described Piłsudski as a masterful strategist and political visionary. Subsequently it survived decades of repression during the decades of communist rule in Poland.

In modern Poland, Piłsudski is recognized as an important and largely positive figure in Polish history.

== Origins ==
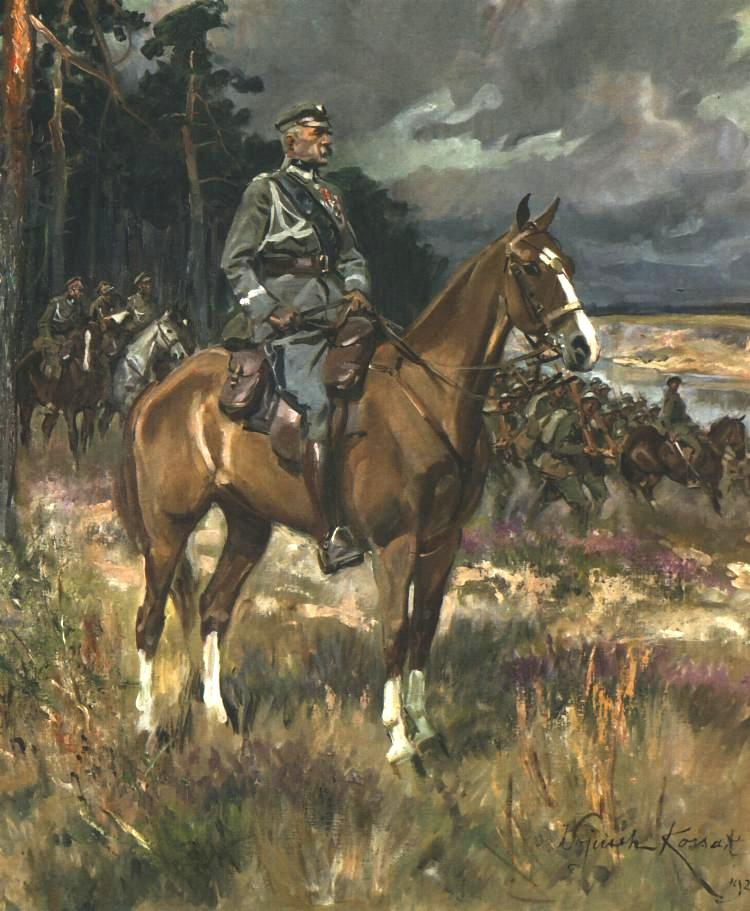
Piłsudski on Kasztanka

Piłsudski's popularity, which has been described as a cult of personality, was connected with his role in restoring Poland's independence after World War I and with his leadership in the 1919–21 Polish–Soviet War. He had, however, been popular already earlier.

Piłsudski seized power with his May 1926 Coup. He was not particularly interested in cultivating his cult, which was done by others, especially after his death in 1935. His funeral became a major state ceremony and a sign of things to come, as his followers, known as Piłsudskiites, sought to exploit his legend to legitimize their grip on political power. Many initiatives honoring Piłsudski's memory were proposed, so numerous that the Main Committee for Commemorating the Memory of Marshal Józef Piłsudski had to curb some of the more outlandish ones (such as renaming the city of Wilno to Piłsudski's childhood nickname, Ziuk). In 1938 the Polish Parliament passed a decree criminalizing any posthumous defamation of Piłsudski.

Piłsudski's cult is associated with Polish Independence Day, as 11 November 1918 was also the day he was made interim Chief of State of newly-independent Poland. In 1937 Poland's Parliament declared November 11 a national holiday celebrating the country's restored independence, stating that "for all time [it shall be] associated with the great name of Józef Piłsudski." Initially the celebration of Poland's independence was indeed also a celebration of Piłsudski and the Polish Army, but with the passage of time that relation has lost some of its strength.

Despite these efforts, his cult had already begun to wane shortly after his death – according to some, as early as 1937.

Piłsudski's cult was opposed by some parties from the very first days of its emergence, most notably by the Endecja party, opponents of the pro-Piłsudski Sanation party. Critics of Piłsudski faced some persecution from the state and its supporters.

The cult was particularly strong in the Polish Army. During the Second World War, the Polish Armed Forces in the West continued that tradition, but many leaders of the Polish government in exile, such as Władysław Sikorski (who had been sidelined by the prewar government), opposed it.

Even in his lifetime Piłsudski became the namesake of the Polish Navy's gunboat ORP Komendant Piłsudski and of the transatlantic liner Piłsudski; the latter, built in Italy, was Poland's first modern transatlantic liner, launched in December 1934 and entering service in September 1935.

== Later years ==
Piłsudski's cult was suppressed during the time of communist Poland, whose authorities attempted to portray him as a fraud, egoist and even a fascist, as well as holding him responsible for much of Poland's ills. The fond memory of Piłsudski persisted among segments of the Polish population, nonetheless, and he became an important figure for many Solidarity activists, including Lech Wałęsa. Piłsudski was also respected abroad. By the late 1980s, the Polish communists changed tack and attempted to integrate Piłsudski's popularity into their own propaganda but to little effect.

At the time of the fall of communism in Poland in 1989, the Polish Parliament in February that year restored 11 November as a Polish holiday (it had been abolished during the communist period). In modern Poland, Piłsudski is recognized as an important and largely positive figure in Polish history, a patron of numerous streets and institutions. Since the 1980s he has often been regarded in national surveys as one of the most influential Polish historical figures (prior data, from the communist era, are not representative), but since the late 1990s he has been supplanted in that ranking by Pope John Paul II. Paweł Kusiak argues that the 1990s represent the Golden Age of Piłsudski's popularity.

Piłsudski's cult and legend are still present in Polish political and cultural discourse; in the 2005 Polish presidential election Piłsudski was declared the most influential politician by both Donald Tusk and Lech Kaczyński, and he was positively referenced by Polish President Bronisław Komorowski in his 2010 electoral campaign. However, some groups in modern Polish society are highly critical of Piłsudski and his legacy.

In 2014 a monument to Piłsudski was erected in Chisinau, designed by the Moldovan sculptor Veaceslav Jiglitchi.

== See also ==
- Piłsudski's colonels
- Józef Piłsudski Park
- Edward Rydz-Śmigły's cult of personality
- Act on the protection of the name of Józef Piłsudski
