= Edward Śmigły-Rydz' cult of personality =

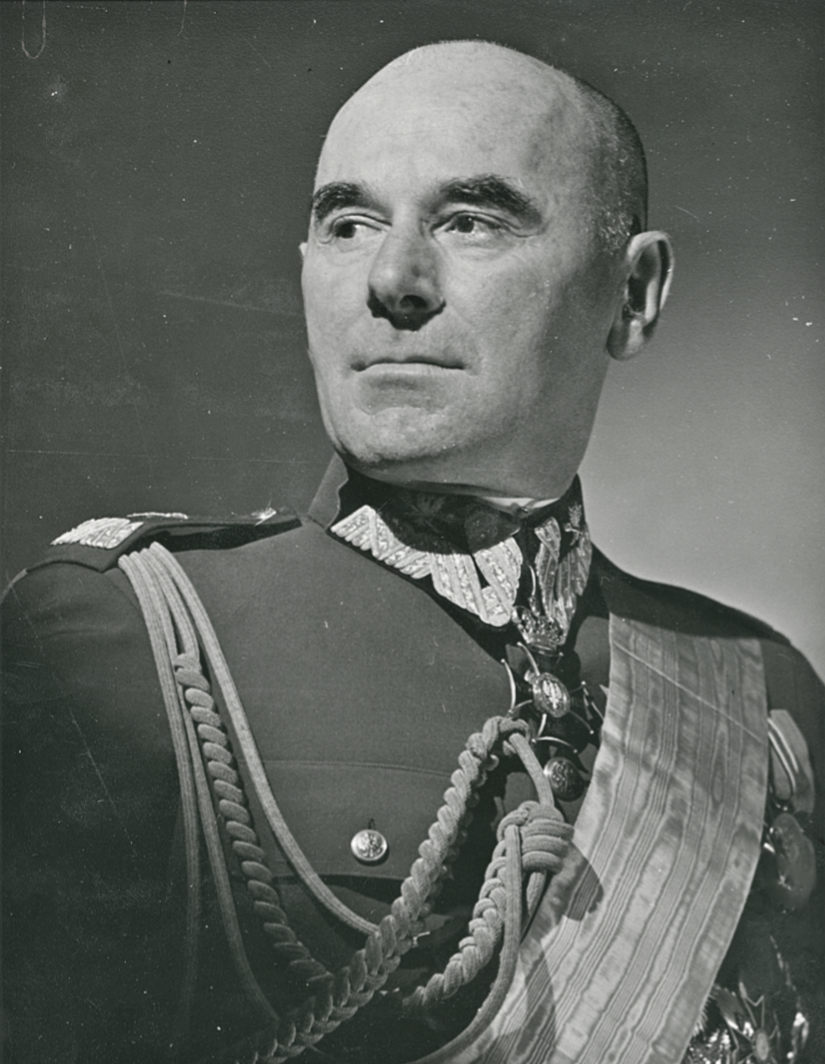
Official portrait of Edward Śmigły-Rydz, c. 1939

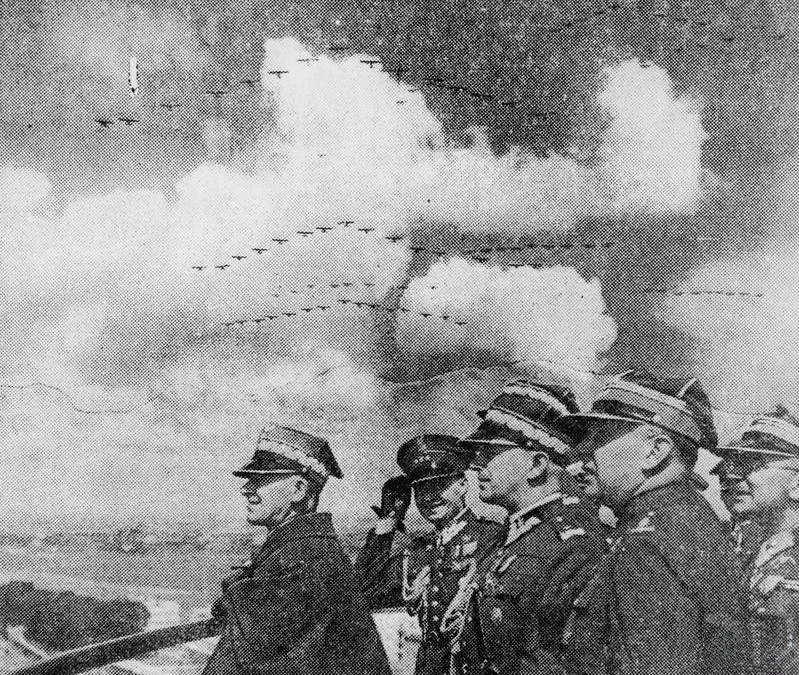
Edward Śmigły-Rydz and his staff – a propaganda photograph from 1939 intended to showcase the alleged might of Polish aviation. The image is, in fact, a photomontage; it actually depicts German aircraft in formation during the Nazi Party rally in Nuremberg in 1937, rather than Polish planes

Edward Śmigły-Rydz''s cult of personality emerged in the final years of the Second Polish Republic, portraying the general and later marshal as a great commander and political leader of the Polish nation, as well as the successor to Józef Piłsudski's vision and actions.

The cult was perpetuated through state propaganda and the ideology of the Camp of National Unity. Images of the marshal appeared on street posters and portraits displayed in state institutions. Edward Śmigły-Rydz was made an honorary member of numerous organizations, an honorary citizen of several towns, and had streets, buildings, and institutions named after him. He also became the subject of propagandistic literary works.

The collapse of Poland during the September Campaign, coupled with Śmigły-Rydz abandonment of the Polish army and his subsequent internment in Romania, along with the disintegration of the state governed by the Sanation authorities, brought an end to the official promotion of his cult by state institutions.

== Rise of Śmigły-Rydz' influence in the Sanation camp after Piłsudski's death ==
On the night of 12 to 13 May 1935, shortly after the death of Józef Piłsudski, President Ignacy Mościcki decided during a Cabinet Council meeting that General Edward Śmigły-Rydz would become the General Inspector of the Armed Forces. His main contender for the position was General Kazimierz Sosnkowski. The president's decision was supported by the then Prime Minister, Walery Sławek. Both Mościcki and Sławek believed the new General Inspector would focus on military matters and refrain from engaging in politics – unlike Sosnkowski, who was known for his political ambitions.

After Piłsudski's death, tensions grew within the Sanation camp, particularly between Prime Minister Sławek and President Mościcki, who had increasing political aspirations. Śmigły-Rydz, disliking Sławek, formed an informal alliance with Mościcki. This led to Sławek's marginalization within the ruling camp, the collapse of his government, and the appointment of a new cabinet under Marian Zyndram-Kościałkowski. In May 1936, Kościałkowski resigned, and Felicjan Sławoj Składkowski, supported by the General Inspector, was tasked with forming a new government. This cabinet included politicians informally referred to as "Rydz's ministers": Tadeusz Kasprzycki, Juliusz Ulrych, and Witold Grabowski.

In his inaugural speech, the new Prime Minister strongly emphasized Śmigły-Rydz role as Piłsudski's successor. He stated that he took office under the orders of the president and the General Inspector. Składkowski underscored that despite Piłsudski's death, Poland still had a leader who vigilantly watched over the nation's soul, claiming that all efforts should be devoted to this leader, even to the last drop of blood. He also highlighted the necessity of creating a center of unified will and direction.

During this period, Śmigły-Rydz importance significantly increased. Government-controlled press portrayed him as the natural continuation of Józef Piłsudski's legacy. An attempt was made to establish a cult around him, modeled after the one surrounding Piłsudski. Initially, Śmigły-Rydz had no purely political ambitions, but the situation changed after the death of the First Marshal. Some sources attribute this shift to the overwhelming influence of Śmigły-Rydz' wife, Marta. Many of the general's supporters, including Wojciech Stpiczyński and Bogusław Miedziński, saw him as a unifying figure that was sorely needed after Piłsudski's death. It was often emphasized that Śmigły-Rydz became the General Inspector of the Armed Forces in accordance with the First Marshal's last will.

== Camp of National Unity ==
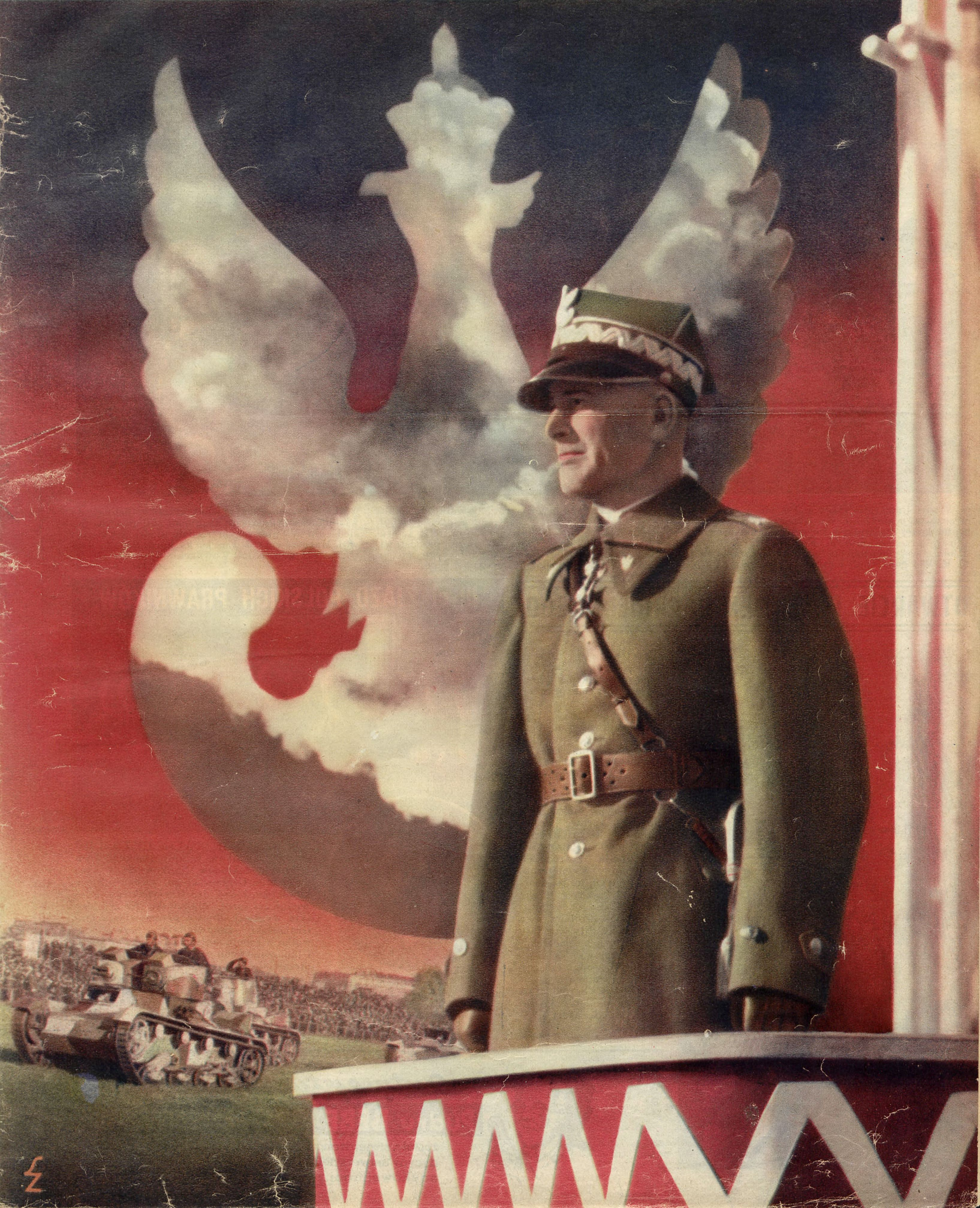
Propaganda poster from 1937 depicting Marshal Śmigły-Rydz against a background of the Polish military eagle and tanks

The creation of the Camp of National Unity was announced by Śmigły-Rydz on 24 May 1936 during the Legionnaires' Congress in Warsaw. From that moment, the volume of publications glorifying him in state-controlled media increased dramatically. Despite holding a strong position within the Sanation camp, Edward Śmigły-Rydz did not formally occupy the highest state offices. However, on 13 July 1936, Prime Minister Felicjan Sławoj Składkowski issued a circular institutionalizing a cult of the general, declaring him as the foremost figure in Poland after the president:

By the will of the President of the Republic of Poland, Ignacy Mościcki, I order the following: General Śmigły-Rydz, designated by Marshal Józef Piłsudski as the First Defender of the Homeland, the primary collaborator of the President of the Republic in governing the State, is to be regarded and respected as the foremost figure in Poland after the President of the Republic. All state officials, including the Prime Minister, are to show him honor and obedience.

This document violated the constitutional order established by the April Constitution of 1935, which vested unified and indivisible state power in the President of the Republic (Article 2, Section 4) and designated the Marshal of the Senate as the President's deputy without granting the title of "second person in the state" (Article 23). According to Stanisław Mackiewicz(He refers to Śmigły-Rydz as Rydz-Śmigły, meaning to emphasize his low-class origins):

Składkowski's circular breached constitutional norms and should have been grounds for his accountability before the State Tribunal. While the concept of a "second person" in the state might have been secondary – given that the Marshal of the Senate was already designated to assume presidential duties in case of death or resignation – the directive's requirement of "obedience" for Rydz-Śmigły fundamentally undermined the April Constitution. It inverted the intended hierarchy, placing Rydz-Śmigły in a position that blended civil and military power, eroding the separation intended by the Constitution. The April Constitution envisioned a system where the government, parliament, judiciary, and armed forces were all under the President's authority. The General Inspector of the Armed Forces was appointed by the President without counter-signature, isolating him from internal political influences. The Constitution delineated the President's dual role: civilian political power (the government, accountable to parliament) and military apolitical authority (the General Inspector of the Armed Forces, not accountable to parliament). Składkowski's circular disrupted this structure by positioning Rydz-Śmigły between the President and the government, effectively reintroducing him into politics. It made Rydz-Śmigły a mediating instance between the President and the government and even rendered him accountable for the government's actions, as one bears responsibility for those subordinate to them.

On 10 November 1936, President Mościcki appointed General Edward Śmigły-Rydz as Marshal of Poland and awarded him the Order of the White Eagle. This was met with skepticism by some members of the Sanation camp, especially the oldest Piłsudski supporters, who believed that this dignity should belong only to Piłsudski.

On 21 February 1937, the ideological declaration of the Camp of National Unity was presented. It was created by the marshal himself, in cooperation with Adam Koc and Bogusław Miedziński. An important element of the Camp of National Unity ideology was the "consolidation of the nation" around the army and its Commander-in-Chief. Śmigły-Rydz was to prepare the Polish people for the upcoming war. He was portrayed as a person standing above current political conflicts, parties, whose thoughts should serve as a guide for the programs and actions of all organizations operating in the state. The figure of Śmigły-Rydz was continuously highlighted by government media, which informed the public about all details of his life (tonsillitis, hunting), published his photos, and even speeches that contributed nothing to political life; it emphasized that Śmigły-Rydz was always present wherever he was most needed. A characteristic feature of the press' interest in the leader was the sidelining of other Camp of National Unity figures, such as Stanisław Skwarczyński or Zygmunt Wenda, during the growing threat from Germany.

The cult of Śmigły-Rydz was widely used by Camp of National Unity propaganda during the Lithuanian crisis in March 1938. The border incident, which ended with the death of a Polish soldier, was exploited at that time. From this period comes the slogan: "Leader, lead us to Kaunas!". It was unofficially spread by the Camp of National Unity, hoping to strengthen the marshal's popularity after Poland's forced establishment of diplomatic relations with Lithuania. A similar situation occurred with the occupation of Trans-Olza by Polish forces in October 1938. The Polish population greeted Śmigły-Rydz enthusiastically upon his arrival in Cieszyn on October 12. This was the peak period of the marshal's and the Sanation camp's popularity among society.

== Manifestations of the cult of Śmigły-Rydz ==
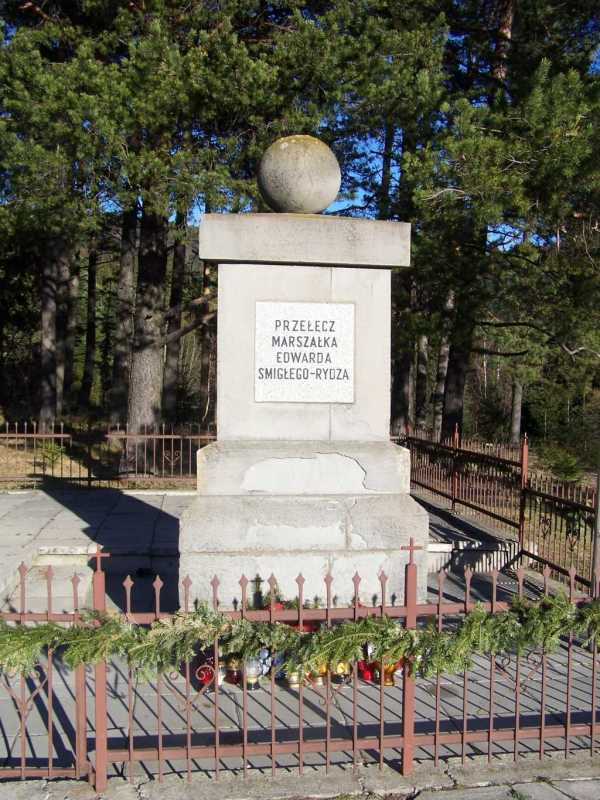
Śmigły-Rydz monument at the Śmigły-Rydz Pass

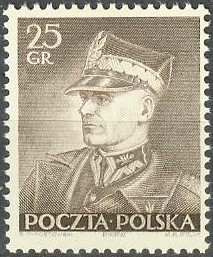
Likeness of Śmigły-Rydz on a 1937 postage stamp

Manifestations of the military cult included posters displayed on the streets, featuring a portrait of the general against the backdrop of Piłsudski's image. Furthermore, Śmigły-Rydz' name day (March 18) began to be celebrated like a national holiday (in military units, schools, and the Shooting Association, there were events, and articles dedicated to him were published in the press). Articles in his honor appeared in the press, his portraits were hung in government offices and post offices, and posters with slogans emphasizing citizens' loyalty to the General Inspector were displayed. In 1937, poet Henryk Zbierzchowski wrote a Name Day Ballad for the Marshal. An extremely popular song in the military (and taught in some schools) had lyrics by Adam Kowalski:

Forward, soldiers, old faith, young scouts.

Behind Śmigły-Rydz, remember his glory in battle,

He will lead us safely out of every storm,

The Commander himself, the Commander himself gave him to us,

The Commander himself, the Commander,

Gave him to us as our Leader!

Marshal Śmigły-Rydz, our dear, brave Leader,

When he commands, we shall go and strike the invaders.

No one will harm us, no one will hurt us,

Because with us is Śmigły, Śmigły, Śmigły-Rydz!

In the dawn of freedom, he led us through blood and fire.

He led us to Kyiv along the victorious path.

As a private, he trudged through the sand with the infantry,

He gave us a good example, a good example,

He always gave us a good example.

In honor of the marshal, the name of the Chyszówki Pass was changed to the Śmigły-Rydz Pass, and the settlement of Żurawka near Zalishchyky was renamed Śmigłowo. 18 locations across Poland (people's houses, community centers, and sports clubs) were named after Śmigły-Rydz. Among them was, for example, the bridge on the Vistula in Włocławek, opened in September 1937; an avenue in Zakopane, opened in December 1938; a street in Vilnius; the Pilot School of the Air Defense and Anti-Gas League in Świdnik, opened on 4 June 1939; and school No. 48 in Warsaw, which was named after Śmigły-Rydz on 21 February 1939.

In 1937, the Polish Post issued postage stamps with the portrait of the marshal, valued at 25 and 55 groszy.

Sculptures of Śmigły-Rydz were created by: Jan Małeta, Henryk Kuna, and Stanislav Poplavsky. The military figure appeared in paintings by Konstanty Szewczenko, Marian Byliński, Jan Olszyna-Olszewski, Stefan Norblin, Danuta Munnich, Karol Kryński, and on a sketch by Józef Szperber.

On 20 May 1937, the Stefan Batory University in Vilnius awarded Śmigły-Rydz the title of honorary doctor of medicine. In November 1938, the Warsaw University of Technology also granted him the honorary doctorate. Similarly, in 1938, he was honored with the same title by the University of Warsaw (along with Józef Beck), and on 27 October 1938, the Jan Kazimierz University in Lviv awarded him the title (as well as to Minister Beck and President Mościcki).

Edward Śmigły-Rydz was an honorary citizen of Berezhany (since July 1936), Rzeszów (1936), Łańcut, Nowy Sącz (1936), Czeladź (1937), Połaniec (1937), Łęczyca (15 August 1937), Opoczno (18 July 1937), Radom (1937), Kielce (1937), Suwałki (1938), Lubaczów, Baranów Sandomierski, Sosnowiec (30 July 1937), Radzymin (11 July 1938), Jasło (31 January 1939), Włocławek, and Bydgoszcz (September 1937).

On 4 June 1939, Śmigły-Rydz, during his stay in Lublin, received honorary citizenship from 20 cities in the Lublin Land. The diplomas were created by artists and bookbinders from Lublin, Warsaw, Kraków, and Lviv. The diplomas were handwritten (except for the one from Włodawa) on parchment or paper and bound in noble leather, wood (black oak), or metal (e.g., the "Chełm district" diploma made by Władysław Ukleja from Chełm was rolled up and placed in a metal cylinder). The diplomas featured seals from the communes, imprinted in wax.

== Criticism ==
The cult of the military leader faced criticism both from opposition groups to the Sanation camp and from some Piłsudski loyalists. For example, General Lucjan Żeligowski remarked that "Śmigły-Rydz is becoming the leader of the nation, a Marshal, a Hitler, a Mussolini". Maria Dąbrowska wrote that "the first Marshal sentenced Poland to greatness, and the second pardoned it from this sentence". Śmigły-Rydz was also mockingly called "Edward the Great".

The phenomenon was compared to those seen in countries with totalitarian regimes. However, according to scholars like Jacek Majchrowski, the cult surrounding the Marshal did not resemble the solutions adopted in, for example, Fascist Italy. Śmigły-Rydz was attributed pragmatic rather than supernatural qualities. He was regarded as the foremost soldier of the state and a symbol of Poland's strength and territorial integrity. The leader's cult differed from the Italian or German fascist conceptions because it did not claim that Śmigły-Rydz alone had the right to interpret the will of the nation. This view is shared by Edward Śmigły-Rydz' biographer, Ryszard Mirowicz, who adds that Śmigły-Rydz never emphasized his leadership traits. His political role was not defined by legal regulations, and his nationalist views, devoid of racist elements, earned him the support of nationalist groups, which weakened the influence of the National Democrats.

== Military defeat and death ==
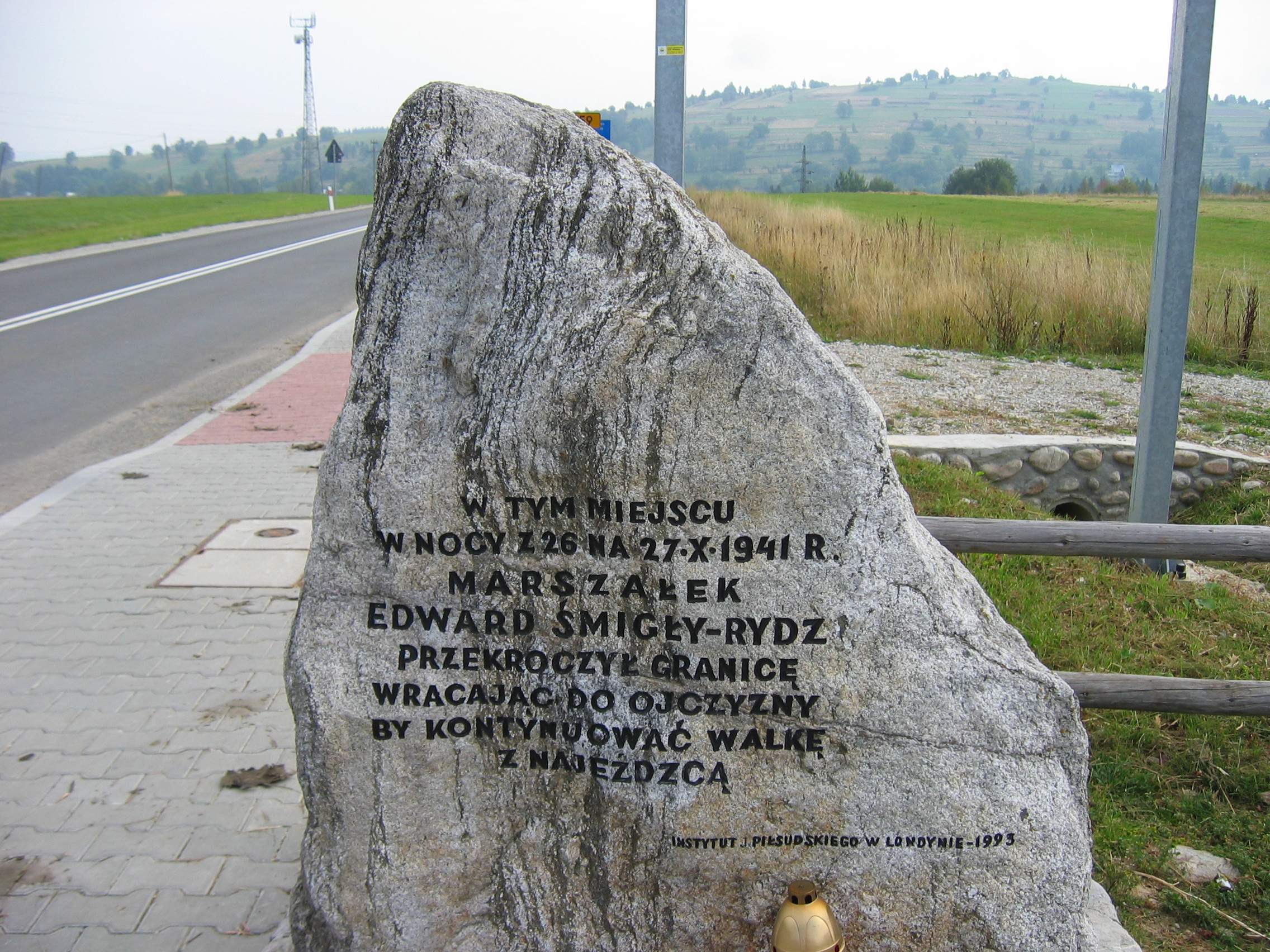
Site where Marshal Edward Rydz-Śmigły crossed the border on 27 October 1941 in Sucha Góra

On 1 September 1939, following Germany's attack on Poland, President of the Republic of Poland Ignacy Mościcki appointed Śmigły-Rydz as Commander-in-Chief and, under Article 24, Paragraph 1 of the April Constitution, designated him as the President's successor in case of the presidency being vacated before a peace agreement was reached. The president also appealed to the citizens to rally around the Commander-in-Chief and the army:

In this historic moment, I appeal to all citizens of the state with the profound conviction that the entire nation, in defense of its freedom, independence, and honor, will rally around the Commander-in-Chief and the armed forces, and will deliver a worthy response to the aggressor, as has happened many times in the history of Polish-German relations.

Due to the superiority of German forces, errors in command, and the Soviet invasion on September 17, Marshal Edward Śmigły-Rydz crossed the border into Romania on 18 September 1939, shortly after midnight, driving across the border bridge over the Cheremosh river. The next day, he was interned. On 27 October 1939, he resigned from his roles as Commander-in-Chief and General Inspector of the Armed Forces. Later, he managed to make his way to Hungary and, under a false name, returned to Poland on 27 October 1941. Edward Śmigły-Rydz died during the night of 1–2 December 1941 in Warsaw, likely from a myocardial infarction. On December 6, he was buried at Warsaw's Powązki Cemetery. His grave (Plot 139-IV-1) was marked with the name "Adam Zawisza".

== Attempts to restore the cult of Śmigły-Rydz in the Third Republic of Poland ==
After 1989, more balanced assessments of his activities emerged, along with certain manifestations of a cult of Śmigły-Rydz. Since 1994, his grave at Warsaw's Powązki Cemetery bears his true identity. Streets in several cities have been named after him, and in Warsaw, a park in the Powiśle district was named in his honor in 1992.

== See also ==
- Józef Piłsudski's cult of personality

== Bibliography ==
- Majchrowski, Jacek (1985). Silni – zwarci – gotowi: myśl polityczna Obozu Zjednoczenia Narodowego [Strong – United – Ready: The Political Thought of the Camp of National Unity] (in Polish). Warsaw: PWN. ISBN 83-01-05323-2.
- Mirowicz, Ryszard (1988). Edward Rydz-Śmigły. Działalność wojskowa i polityczna [Edward Rydz-Śmigły: Military and Political Activities] (in Polish). Warsaw: Instytut Wydawniczy Związków Zawodowych. ISBN 83-202-0603-0.
