= Edward Śmigły-Rydz =

Polish politician and military leader (1886–1941)

Marshal of Poland Edward Śmigły-Rydz
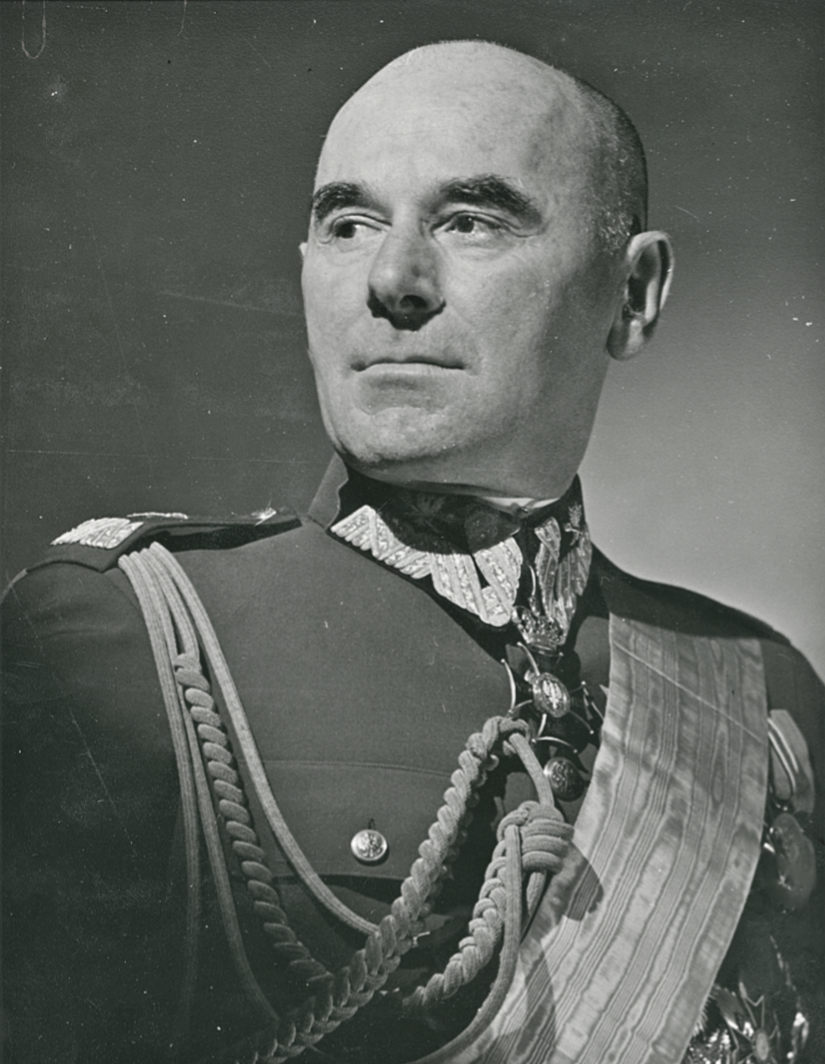
- Official portrait, c. 1939

General Inspector of the Armed Forces 2nd General Inspector of the Armed Forces
- In office 12 May 1935 – 7 November 1939
- President: Ignacy Mościcki
- Preceded by: Józef Piłsudski
- Succeeded by: Władysław Sikorski

Military Leader and Successor to the President of Poland
- In office 1 September 1939 – 25 September 1939
- Appointed by: Ignacy Mościcki
- Succeeded by: Bolesław Wieniawa-Długoszowski

Personal details
- Born: Edward Rydz; 11 March 1886 Brzeżany, Austria-Hungary (now Berezhany, Ternopil Oblast, Ukraine)
- Died: 2 December 1941 (aged 55) Warsaw, occupied Poland
- Domestic partner: Marta Thomas-Zaleska
- Nickname(s): Śmigły, Tarłowski, Adam Zawisza

Military service
- Allegiance: Austria-Hungary; Poland
- Branch/service: Austro-Hungarian Army; Polish Legions; Polish Army
- Years of service: 1910–1911 (Austro-Hungarian Army); 1914–1917 (Polish Legions); 1918–1939 (Polish Army)
- Rank: Fähnrich (Austro-Hungarian Army); Lieutenant colonel (Polish Legions); Marshal of Poland
- Commands: C-i-C of the Polish Armed Forces
- Battles/wars: World War I; Battle of Laski and Anielin; Battle of Łowczówek; Battle of Konary; Battle of Tarłów; Battle of Kostiuchnówka; Polish–Ukrainian War; Polish–Soviet War; Vilna offensive; Battle of Daugavpils; Kiev offensive (1920); Battle of Boryspil; Battle of Warsaw (1920); Battle of the Niemen River; World War II; Invasion of Poland

Marshal Edward Śmigły-Rydz (surname also formulated as Rydz-Śmigły; [ˈɛdvard ˈɕmiɡɫɨ rɨdz] 11 March 1886 – 2 December 1941) was a Polish politician, statesman, Marshal of Poland and Commander-in-Chief of the Polish Armed Forces, as well as a painter and poet.

Born in 1886 and orphaned at age 13, Śmigły-Rydz was raised by his maternal grandparents. He graduated with distinction from the local Gymnasium. He completed his studies in philosophy and art history at the Jagiellonian University.

During the interwar period, he cultivated a cult of personality, and was regarded as a hero for his exemplary record as an army commander in the Polish Legions of World War I and the ensuing Polish–Soviet War in 1920. He was appointed Commander-in-Chief and Inspector General of the Polish Armed Forces following Marshal Józef Piłsudski's death in 1935. Rydz served in this capacity at the start of World War II during the invasion of Poland.

As the war approached, Rydz's stature began to eclipse even that of the president. The shock of the Polish defeat made objective evaluations of his legacy during and after the war difficult; his reputation remains highly controversial in Poland. This is a consequence attributable to missteps made during the critical early months of World War II, the evacuation of government of Poland for Romania, especially paired with the image of invulnerability he constructed beforehand. However, others claim that there was nothing else Śmigły could have done that would've changed the outcome, and the evacuation of the Polish government which saved Poland's gold reserves and established the Polish government-in-exile was in fact a wise move.

== Early life ==
Edward Rydz was born in the city of Brzeżany (now Berezhany in western Ukraine), Galicia, Austria-Hungary, to Polish parents. He was the son of a professional non-commissioned officer in the Austro-Hungarian Army, Tomasz Rydz, and his wife Maria Babiak. Rydz was orphaned at the age of 13. He was then raised by his maternal grandparents and, after their deaths, by the family of a Dr. Uranowicz, the town physician at Brzeżany.

After graduating with distinction from the local gymnasium (secondary school), Rydz went to Kraków, where he completed studies in philosophy and history of art at the Jagiellonian University. He then studied to be a painter at the Academy of Fine Arts in Kraków, and later in Vienna and Munich. In 1910–1911 he attended the reserve officers' academy in Vienna and received military training at the renowned Austrian 4th Infantry Regiment, the "Grand Masters of the Teutonic Knights".

Rydz finished his military education with distinction and was offered a commission in the Imperial Army, which he declined. In 1912 he became a founder of the Polish paramilitary group, the Riflemen's Association (Związek Strzelecki). Concurrently he completed his art studies, regarded as a talented landscape and portrait painter by professors and critics.

== Early military career ==
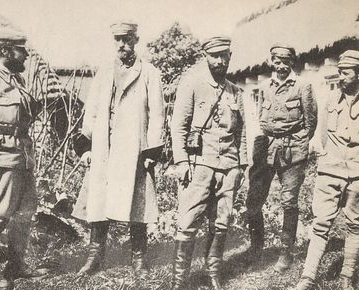
Śmigły-Rydz among a group of officers of the Polish Legions.

Drafted into the Austro-Hungarian Army in July 1914, Rydz was transferred in August to the Polish Legions and fought in World War I in the famous Polish 1st Brigade of Józef Piłsudski. He took part in numerous engagements against the Imperial Russian Army in the region of the Southern Vistula and rose quickly in rank. By 1916, he was already a full colonel. He did not forget his art, however, and exhibited his work at a gallery in Kraków around that time. In 1917, after their refusal to swear an oath to the Austrian and German authorities, the Legions were disbanded, their soldiers interned and their leader Józef Piłsudski imprisoned in Magdeburg fortress. By Piłsudski's appointment, Rydz (who was released from prison on grounds of ill health) became commander of the Polish Military Organization (POW) and adopted the nom de guerre Śmigły ("Swift", "Deft"), which he later officially added to his surname.

In October 1918, Rydz joined Ignacy Daszyński's socialist government in Lublin as minister of war. Having been promoted to brigadier general, he emphasized that on accepting the ministerial post he was to be seen as a deputy of Piłsudski. It was at this time that he began using the dual surname Śmigły-Rydz. On 11 November 1918, the government relinquished power to Piłsudski, who became Provisional Head of State. After some hesitation, Piłsudski (though displeased at Śmigły-Rydz having worked with the socialists) confirmed his rank of brigadier general in the Polish army.

=== Military triumphs ===
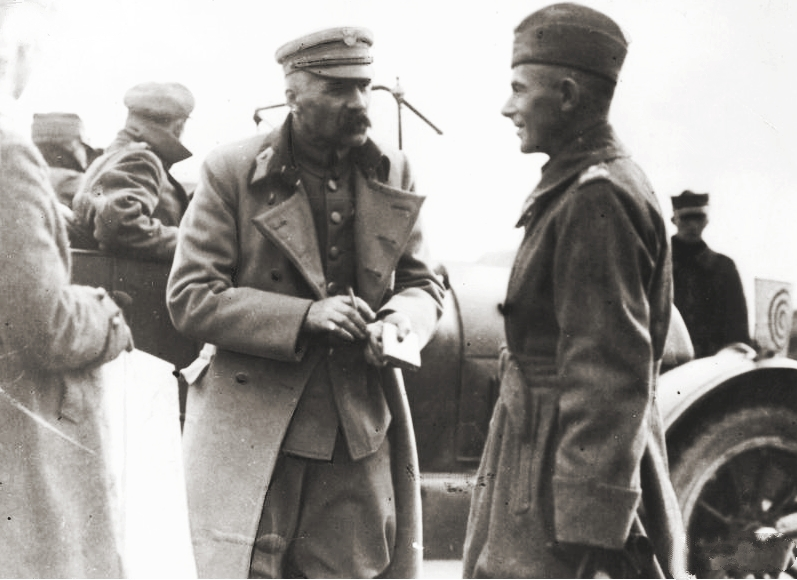
Śmigły-Rydz with Marshal Józef Piłsudski during the Polish-Soviet War

During the Polish-Soviet War of 1919–21, Rydz commanded Polish armies in several offensives against the Bolsheviks. Among the victorious engagements, he captured the cities of Wilno (Vilnius) and Dünaburg. Following his victories on the field, he was appointed Commander-in-Chief of the Latvian armed forces and soon liberated Latgale from the Red Army. Subsequently, he annihilated the Soviet 12th Army and took Kyiv. After the Bolshevik counterattack led the Red Army to the gates of Warsaw, Rydz commanded the Central Front of the Polish forces during the Battle of Warsaw of 1920, also known as the "Miracle on the Vistula". In this decisive battle, Śmigły-Rydz's Central Front held firm against the Soviet attack and later blocked the escape routes for the defeated Soviet 4th and 15th Armies, as well as the 3rd Cavalry Corps of Gayk Bzhishkyan, which in the end retreated to East Prussia to be interned by the Germans.

== Army inspector (1921–1935) ==
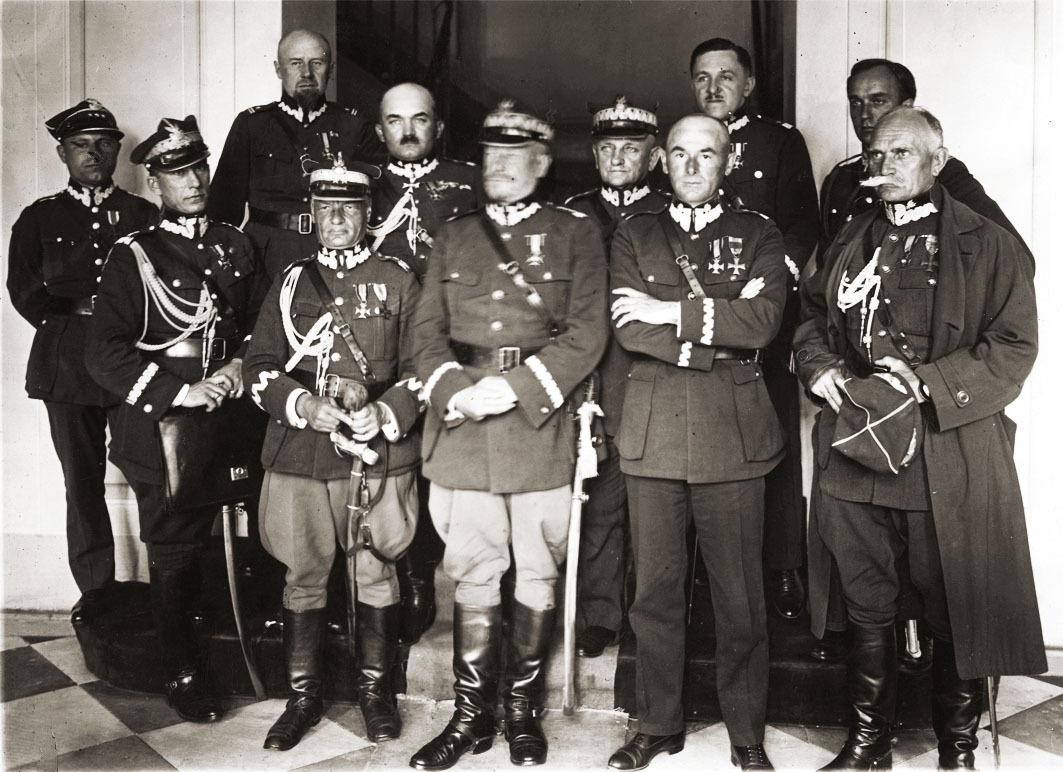
Śmigly-Rydz at army inspectors' conference, 1926

At the conclusion of the Polish-Soviet war, Rydz was appointed Inspector General of the Polish Army in the Wilno district and later in Warsaw. In November 1924, he informally headed the so-called strike of the generals, in which a group of Polish Army commanders resigned to demonstrate their dissatisfaction with the lack of reaction of the Ministry of Military Affairs to the statements of General Franciszek Latinik that were unfavorable to former legionnaires.

In 1926, during Piłsudski's May Coup, Rydz took the Marshal's side and sent troops from Wilno to reinforce anti-government troops in Warsaw. Piłsudski never forgot this fidelity, and in 1929, Rydz was appointed the Marshal's deputy on all matters concerning the East.

== "Second Man" in the State ==
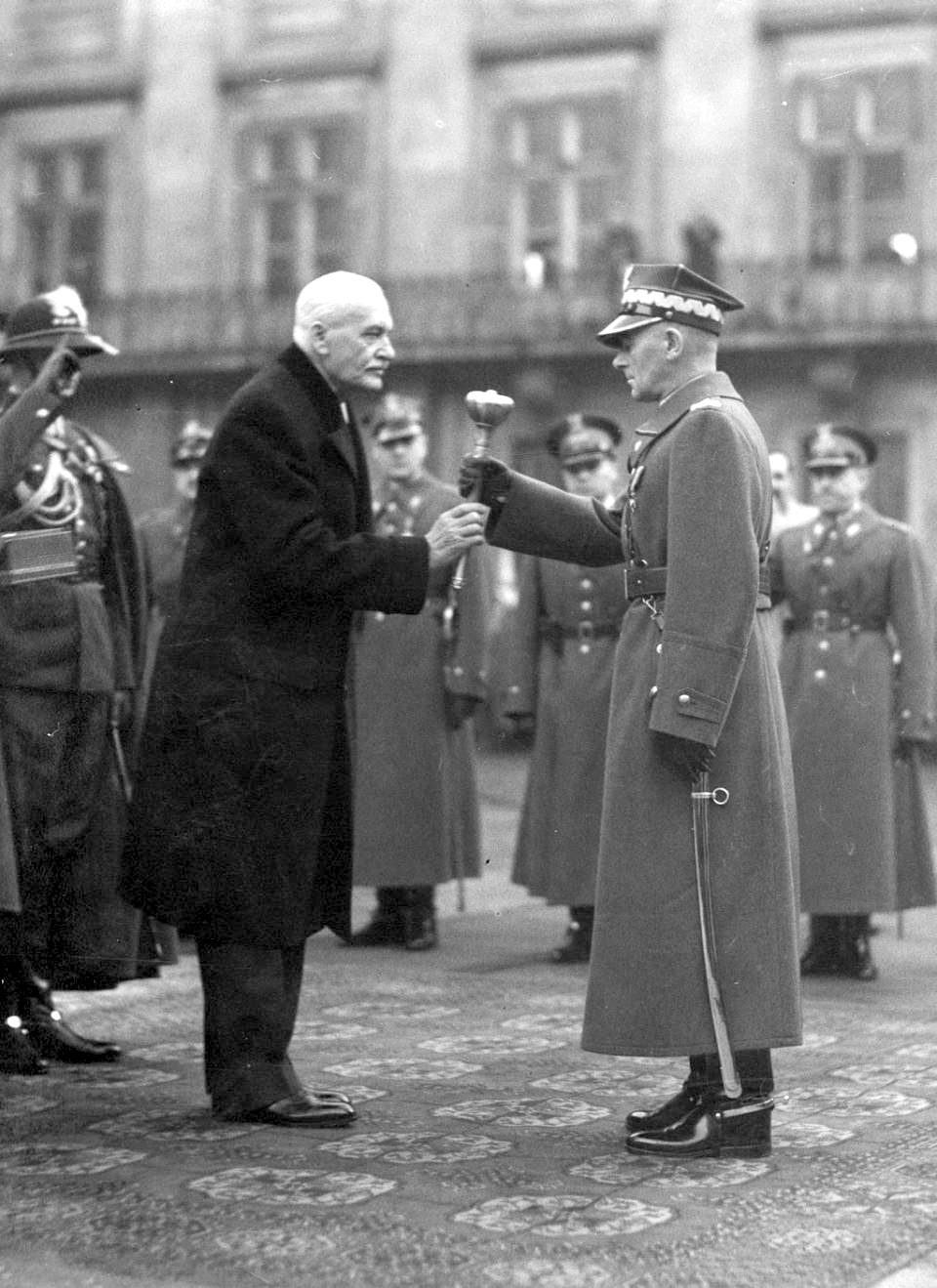
Śmigły-Rydz receives Marshal's buława from President Ignacy Mościcki, Warsaw, 10 November 1936.

On 13 May 1935, following Piłsudski's death, Rydz was nominated by the president and government of Poland to serve in the capacity of the Inspector-General of the Polish Armed Forces, the highest Polish military office. This was done in accordance with Piłsudski's wishes. Piłsudski's death saw his followers (the Sanacja), divide themselves into three main factions: those supporting President Ignacy Mościcki as Piłsudski's successor, those supporting Rydz, and those supporting Prime Minister Walery Sławek. Mościcki in the end would conclude a power-sharing agreement with Śmigły-Rydz, which saw Sławek marginalised as a serious political player by the end of the year. As a result of this agreement, Śmigły-Rydz was to become the de facto leader of Poland until the outbreak of the war, whereas Mościcki remained influential by continuing as president.

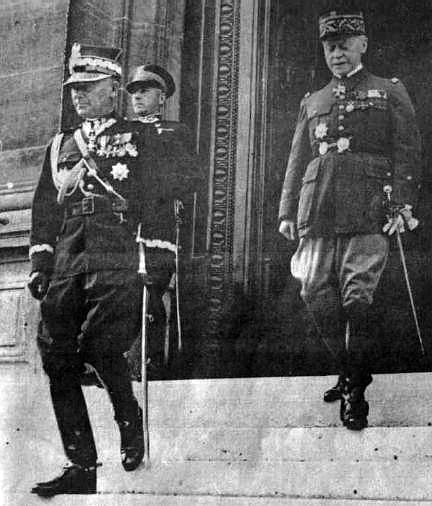
Śmigły-Rydz (left) and French General Maurice Gamelin, Warsaw, August 1936.

From 1935, Rydz climbed in rank and position. On 15 July 1936, he was officially awarded the title of "Second Man in the State after the President" by the Polish prime minister. On 10 November, he was promoted to the rank of Marshal of Poland. Rydz's image as Piłsudski's anointed successor was popularized by the Obóz Zjednoczenia Narodowego ("Camp of National Unity"), or "Ozon", movement, but it alienated many of Piłsudski's supporters, who were offended by what they saw as Rydz's acts of self-promotion.

The period of Rydz's rule, 1935–39, has often been referred to as "a dictatorship without a dictator". Rydz lacked the moral authority of Piłsudski, and the Piłsudskiites were bitterly divided after his death in 1935. The ruling regime was divided between the Mościcki faction (known as the "President's men" or the "Castle group"), made up mainly of civilians, and Rydz's group, known as the "Marshal's men", mostly old comrades of Piłsudski and professional officers. Besides these two major groups, there were also supporters of Sławek and other disgruntled Piłsudskiite groups, which were marginalized after the Rydz-Mościcki pact.

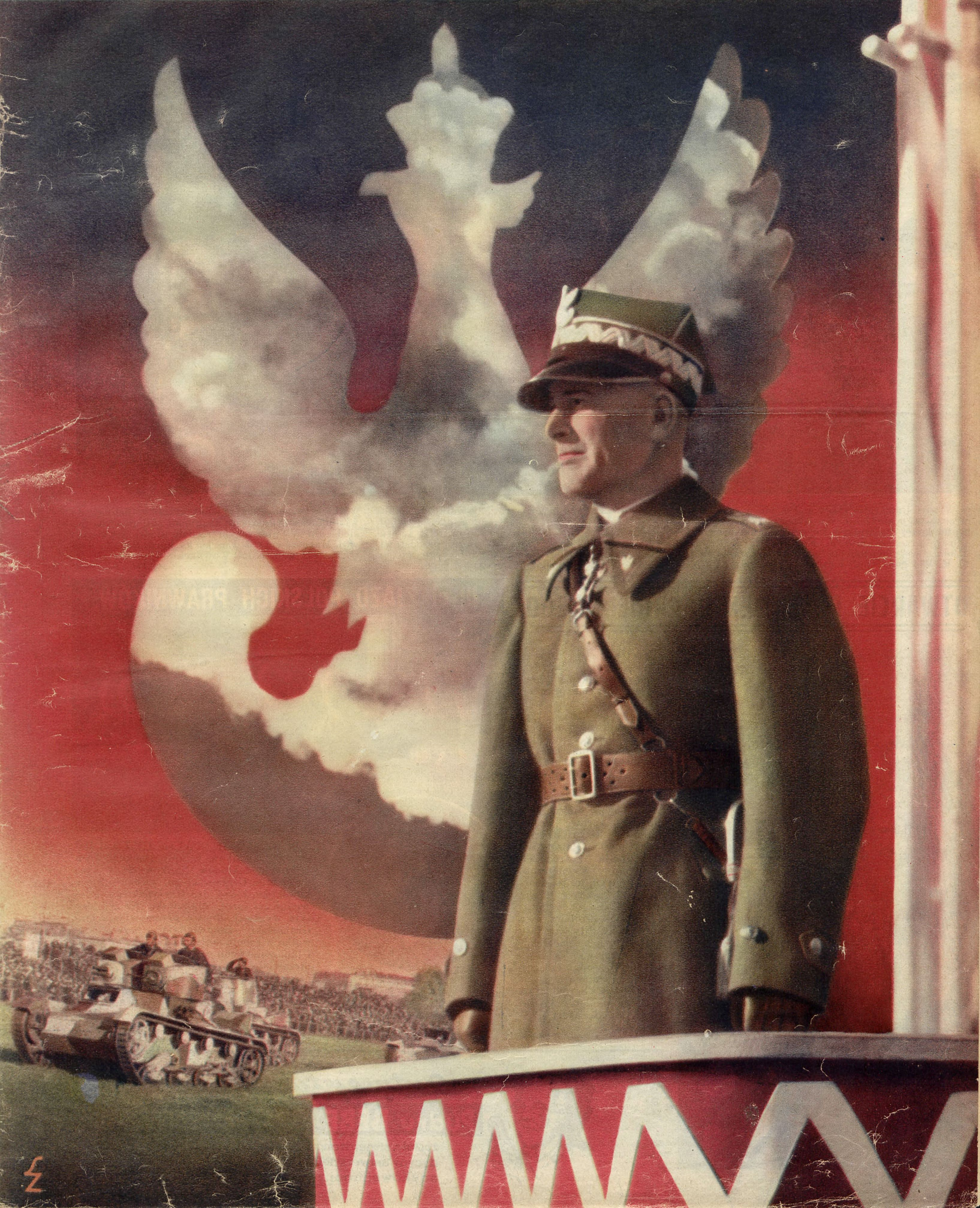
A 1936 propaganda poster

The regime became increasingly authoritarian, as manifested by the creation of the Ozon movement. However, Ozon never achieved its goal of developing popular mass appeal and transforming Rydz into "Poland's second great leader" (after Piłsudski himself). Several of Poland's most prominent politicians, including Mościcki and Foreign Minister Józef Beck, made a point of distancing themselves from this movement.

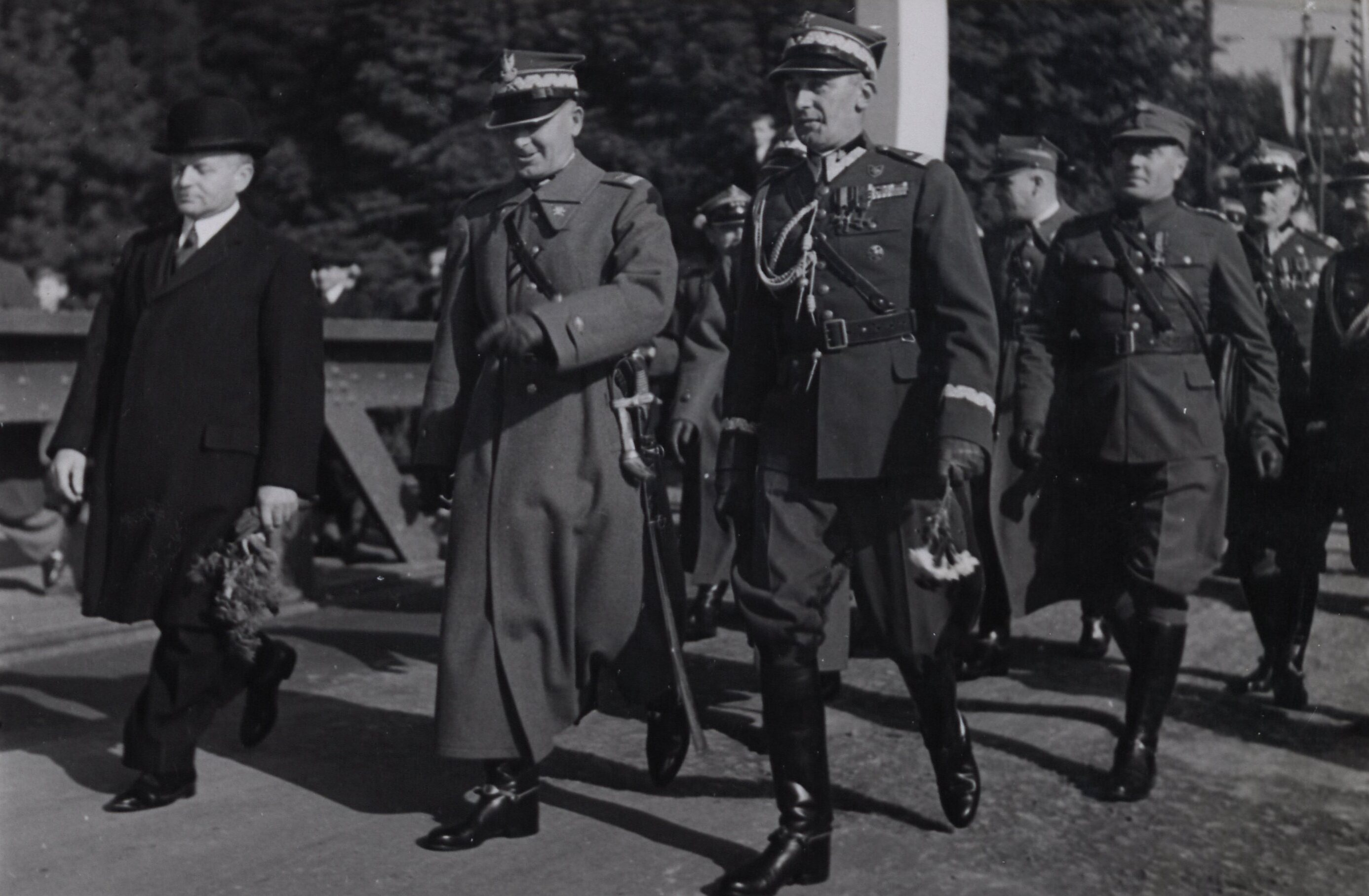
Śmigły-Rydz in Český Těšín, 12 October 1938. Poland annexed Czechoslovakia's Trans-Olza area while Nazi Germany took control of the Sudetenland.

In March 1939, Adolf Hitler split the Second Czechoslovak Republic into the occupied Protectorate of Bohemia and Moravia and the satellite state of the Slovak State. This encircled Poland with an iron ring on all sides except the east. Rydz was the only member of government who saw the impending danger of a conflict with Germany. However, the time remaining was too short for the creation of a new army operational plan in the west. During negotiations in Moscow in August 1939, Rydz refused all attempts by the Western Powers to obtain Polish permission for the Red Army to march westward, stating that "there is no guarantee that the Soviets will really take active part in the war; furthermore, once having entered Polish territory, they will never leave it."

== World War II ==
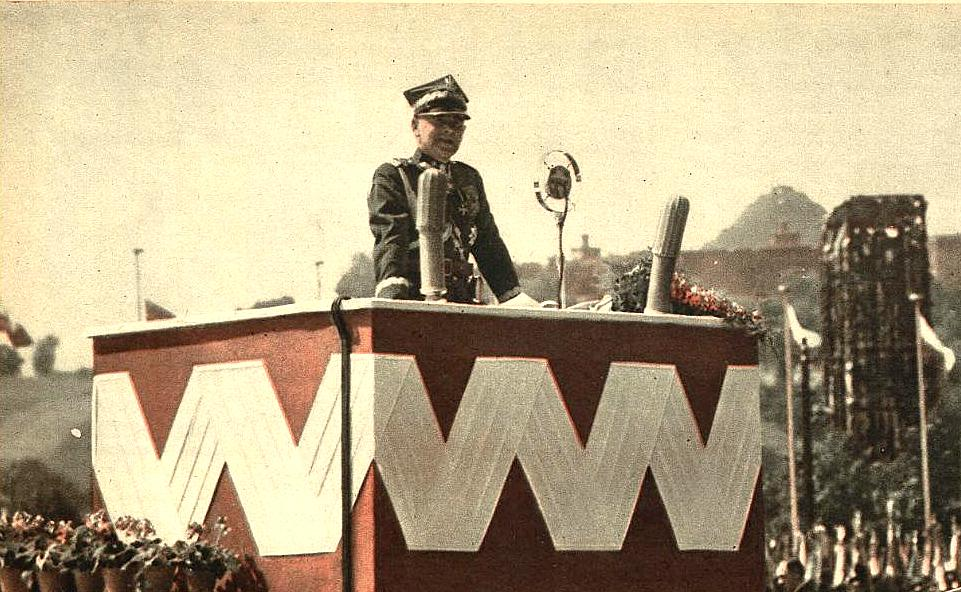
Marshal Śmigły-Rydz declaring Hitler an enemy of the state, Kraków, 6 August 1939.

On 1 September 1939, the Germans invaded Poland, and Śmigły-Rydz was named Commander-in-Chief of all Polish forces. On 7 September, along with most of the government, he evacuated Warsaw as it came under attack. Soon afterwards, Polish coordination began to suffer from issues with their communication equipment, which impaired Rydz's ability to command his forces effectively. In Brest (Brześć) on 11 September, he ordered the Polish capital to be defended at all costs. In his plan, Warsaw and the nearby Modlin Fortress were to become two redoubt-citadels in central Poland to fight on for as long as possible while the bulk of the Polish forces were to defend the Romanian bridgehead and await the counterattack promised by Poland's allies – the French and British. Unknown to Śmigły-Rydz, the Western Allies had no such plan and expected Poland to fall (see Western betrayal). This strategy was further crippled when Soviet forces invaded Poland from the east on 17 September. Realizing that mounting a defence against both Germany and the USSR was impossible, Śmigły-Rydz issued orders to his forces to begin a retreat towards Romania and to not waste men on fighting the Soviet aggressors.

On 18 September 1939, after avoiding capture by Soviet and then German troops, Śmigły-Rydz escaped to Romania and was interned. The crossing of the Polish government into Romania prevented Poland from having to officially surrender and allowed Polish soldiers to continue the fight against Nazi Germany, though Rydz's flight sparked some controversy because of his position as supreme commander of the Polish armed forces. Large numbers of Polish soldiers and airmen managed to escape into southern Europe through Hungary and Romania and later regrouped in France. After the French surrender, they re-assembled once more, but this time in the UK.

=== Internment in Romania ===
John Gunther wrote after Śmigły-Rydz and Beck were interned in Romania that "They ought, one might say, to have been interned somewhere else before". As the Commander-in-Chief of the Polish Armed Forces, Śmigły-Rydz took complete responsibility for Poland's military defeat in September 1939. Rydz had proven himself an extremely able commander on smaller fronts in earlier wars, but was not an experienced strategist in a great conflict. Indeed, in 1922, in an evaluation of Polish generals, Piłsudski had written about him: "in operational work he displays healthy common sense and a lot of stubborn energy. I could recommend him to everybody as a commander of an army, I am however not sure if he possesses sufficient abilities to function as commander-in-chief in a war between two states."

During his internment in Romania, Śmigły-Rydz initiated the creation of a Polish underground originating from officers who were loyal to the memory of Piłsudski. Still in Romania, on 27 October, he relinquished his function as the Commander-in-Chief and Inspector-General of the Armed Forces. This role was assumed by Władysław Sikorski, who was serving in the new Polish government-in-exile in France (and after 1940 in the United Kingdom).

In the autumn of 1939, Polish journalist Melchior Wańkowicz met Beck, also in internment, and he managed to talk to him for a few hours. Wańkowicz wrote the following about this meeting:

It was completely impossible to get to Rydz, as he was kept in wild mountains, in the summer villa of Patriarch Miron, closely guarded by a special unit of Romanian police. I managed to get to his villa after bribing a Romanian officer, with the help of Rydz's physician, Dr. Cianciara (...) The Marshal spoke with a charming smile, but there was no spark in this smile. He said that after Piłsudski's death, the condition of the army was catastrophic: "The cost of the construction of modest fortifications along our western border was equivalent to an 18-month budget of Poland, and at the same time, we were working on fortifications in the East. A modest armament plan was up to 5 billion złotys. What was I supposed to do? I am not an economist, minister Eugeniusz Kwiatkowski told me that we only had 180 million (...) We began partial mobilization in the spring 1939. The nation hated it, more than 1,000 Silesians deserted to Germany. We were unable to keep Poland mobilized for so long, we could not afford it (...) They say that I am a coward. I had three options: to surrender, to kill myself, and to be captured. It was impossible to fight, as I had only half a company of soldiers with me. To kill myself meant failure. To fly to Warsaw?"

Śmigły-Rydz was transferred from the internment camp to the villa of a former Romanian prime minister in Dragoslavele, from where he escaped on 10 December 1940 and crossed illegally into Hungary. His flight to Hungary and rumours about his planned return to Poland were a source of considerable displeasure to his rival Sikorski, now Prime Minister. Sikorski had been in opposition to Śmigły-Rydz and Piłsudski from the time of the 1926 May Coup. Sikorski declared in a telegram to General Stefan Grot-Rowecki, leader of the Armia Krajowa (AK) underground resistance in Poland: "the Polish Government will regard a sojourn of the Marshal in Poland as a sabotage of its work in the country. The Marshal must as soon as possible move to some country of the British Empire".

=== Return to Poland and death ===
However, Śmigły-Rydz left Hungary on 25 October 1941, and reached Poland after traveling through Slovakia. On 30 October, in strict secrecy, he came back to Warsaw to participate in the resistance movement as a common underground soldier, thus voluntarily suspending his rank as Marshal of Poland. He managed to contact Grot-Rowecki, but remained incognito. He died suddenly of heart failure at the age of 55, on 2 December 1941, only five weeks after his arrival in Warsaw.

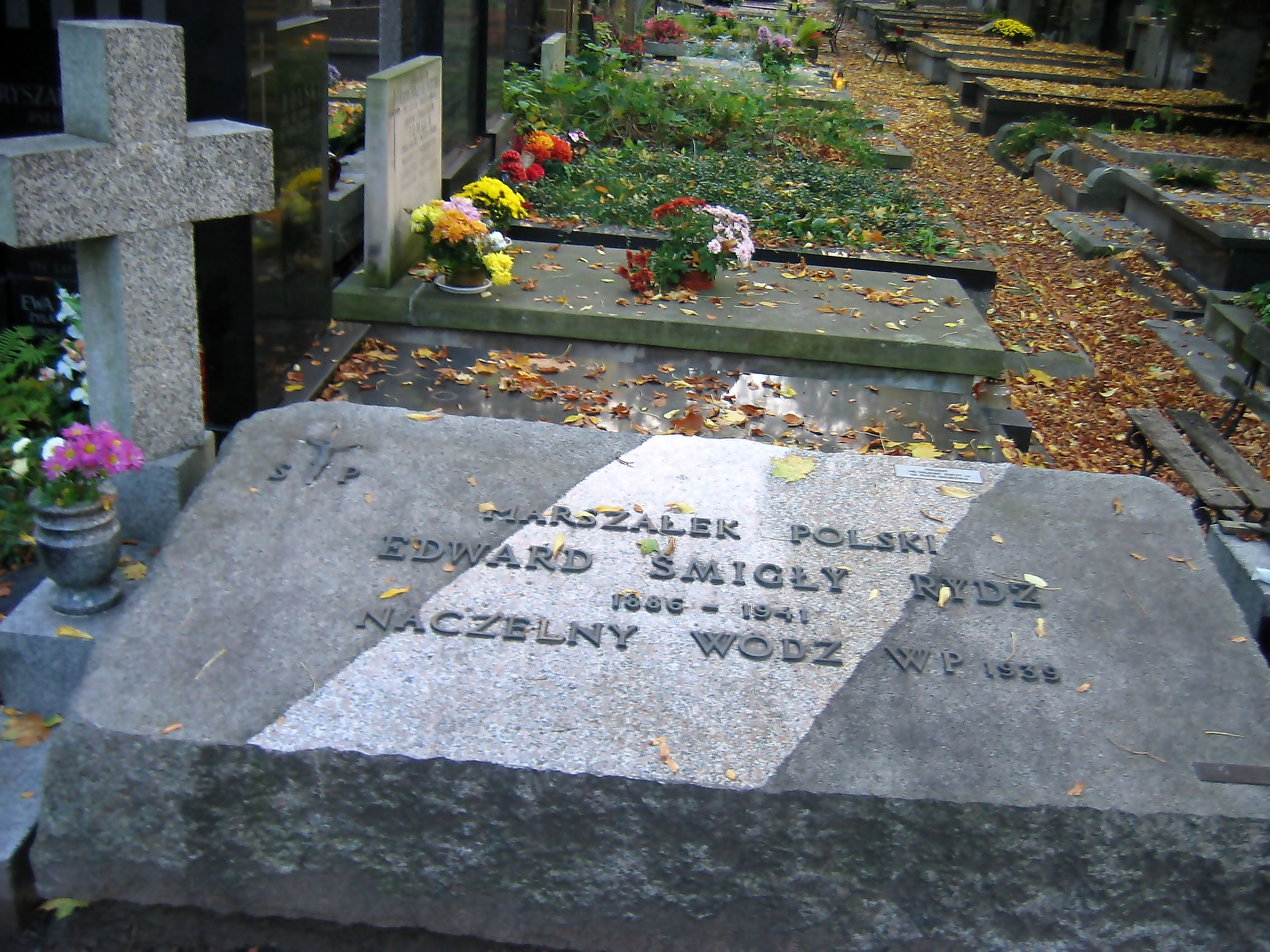
The Marshal's grave in Warsaw.

Rydz was married to Marta Zaleska, née Thomas; they had no children.

He was buried in Warsaw under his nom de guerre "Adam Zawisza". His tombstone at the Powązki Cemetery bore this assumed name until 1991. A new tombstone inscribed with the Marshal's full name was placed over his grave by the people of Warsaw in 1994.

== Legacy ==
Edward Śmigły-Rydz's reputation after World War II was generally negative. In the Soviet Union, the Polish People's Republic, and other Eastern Bloc states, he was denounced for his participation in the Polish-Soviet War in 1920, for the political repression of far-left elements under his military government of the late 1930s, and for his key role in the Polish defeat of 1939. In the West, due to the influence of anti-Piłsudski circles (with Władysław Sikorski as their foremost representative), he was seen as having fled the battlefield in 1939, and little recognition was given to the actual and impossible circumstances of Poland's invasion and defeat by the Germans and Soviets.

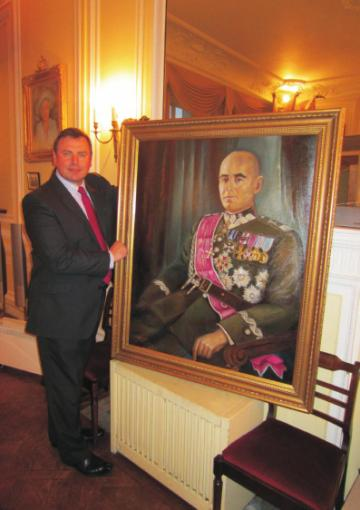
Philip Bujak with the restored painting of Edward Śmigły-Rydz

In 2016, a large and detailed oil painting was discovered amongst the archives of the Sikorski Museum in London. It had been folded into four and hidden in a briefcase by an unknown person and smuggled to Britain to avoid being taken by the Nazi occupation forces. After quite a feat of restoration funded by Philip Bujak, a member of the Polish Heritage Society, the fully restored painting was presented back to the Sikorski Institute where it is currently on display.

== Awards and tributes ==
Polish Decorations

- Order of the White Eagle
- Commander and Knight of Virtuti Militari
- Grand Cross, Grand Officer and Officer of Order of Polonia Restituta,
- Four times Cross of Valour, Golden Cross of Merit (Złoty Krzyż Zasługi), and Cross of Independence with Swords.

Foreign decorations

- Grand Cross of the Order of the Star of Romania,
- Grand Cross of the Order of the Crown of Italy,
- Grand Cross of the French Order of the Legion of Honour,
- Grand Cross of the Order of the White Eagle and Order of Saint Sava of Yugoslavia,
- Grand Cross of the Hungarian Order of Merit,
- Grand Cross of the Japanese Order of the Rising Sun,
- Knight of Latvia's highest military award, Order of Lāčplēsis (the Order of the Bearslayer), 2nd class,
- Pulaski Medal (USA)
- Italian Cross of Military Merit.

Honorary Titles

Rydz was Honorary Doctor of the Universities of Warsaw and (then-Polish) Vilnius and the Warsaw University of Technology, as well as an Honorary Citizen of several Polish cities.

Tributes

Marshal Edward Śmigły-Rydz Park is a large tree-covered public park in Warsaw, established after World War II on the eastern side of the Polish parliament building.

== Works ==
=== Paintings ===
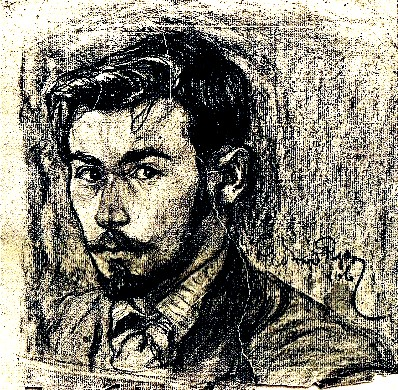
Self-portrait, 1906

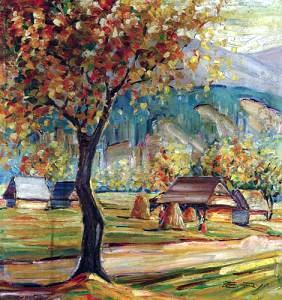
Autumn mountain landscape, 1910

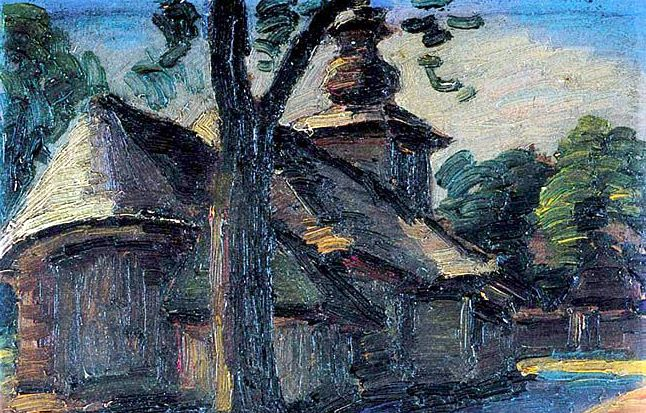
Old Church in Zakopane, oil painting, 1910

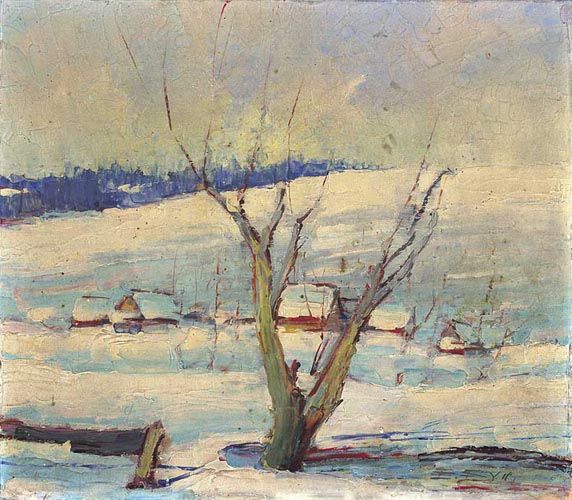
Winter landscape from Olcza, 1910

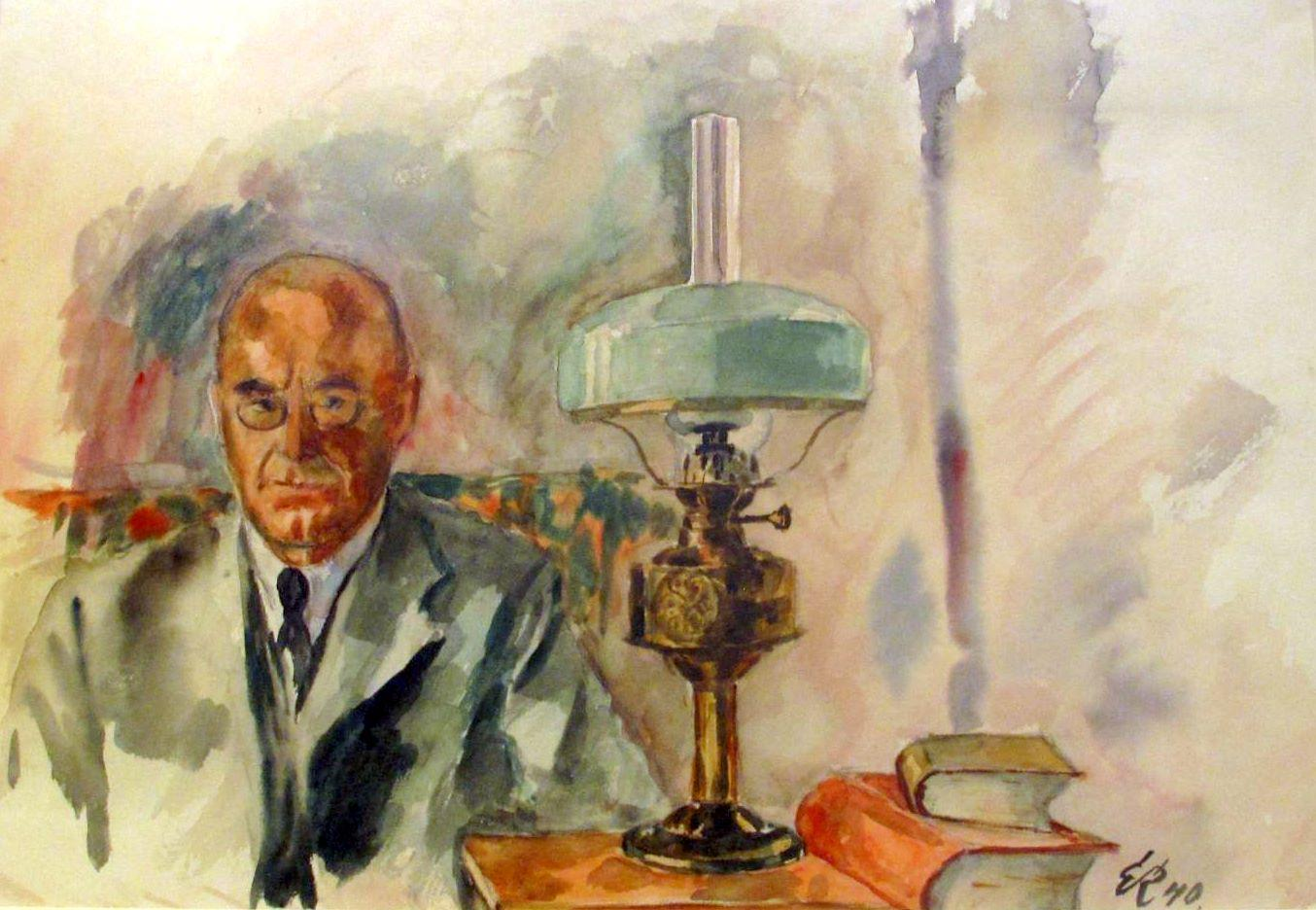
Self-portrait, 1935

=== Writings ===
- On military tactics and theory
- Walka na bagnety (Bayonet Fight), Lwów 1914;
- W sprawie polskiej doktryny (Poland's Military Doctrine), Warsaw 1924;
- Kawaleria w osłonie (Cavalry in protection of troops), Warsaw 1925;
- Byście o sile nie zapomnieli - Rozkazy, Artykuły, Mowy (Do not forget the Might – Orders, Articles and Speeches), Warsaw 1936;
- Wojna polsko-niemiecka (The Polish-German War), Budapest 1941.
- Dążąc do końca swoich dróg (Toward My Path's End), Paris, 1947; London, 1989.
- Illustrations to Piłsudski's book 22 January 1863, Lwów 1920; Contributions to Art Exhibitions in Kraków (1916) and Warsaw (1917). Most of his paintings are lost.

== See also ==
- Coat of arms of Ryc

== Sources and notes ==
Military offices
Preceded by Józef Piłsudski	General Inspector of the Armed Forces; 1935–1939	Succeeded by Władysław Sikorski
