= Wieniawa coat of arms =

Polish coat of arms

Wieniawa
- Battle cry: Wieniawa
- Alternative names: Bawola Głowa, Bawół, Bavolina Caput, Caput Bawola, Caput Bubalum, Pierstynia, Ząbrza Głowa, Zubrza Głowa
- Earliest mention: 1382 (seal)
- Cities: Leszno
- Divisions: Kalisz Voivodship, Gmina Przygodzice
- Families: 265 names A Albinowicz, Albinowski, Anferowicz. B Bambelski, Bedelański, Bedleński, Bedliński, Będzieński, Białłozor, Białozor, Białozór, Blandowski, Bobbe, Boczkowski, Bodzanta, Bodzenta, Bodzęta, Bognar, Bognarewicz, Bognarowicz, Bolko, Borejka, Borejko, Boreyko, Bosuta, Bożkowski, Brachowski, Brodnicki, Brodowicki, Brodowski, Brodzikowski, Bronisz, Bronowski. C Chabielski, Chadziewicz, Cherubin, Chlewiński, Chmielewski, Chmielowski, Chrzczonowicz, Ciświcki, Czermieński, Czermiński, Czernikowski, Czerwiński. D Denkowski, Denowski, Derżko, Długosz, Długoszewski, Długoszowski, Dorf, Dowejko, Drzeczkowski, Dynowski, Dziczkowicz, Dziekanowski, Dzierzko, Dzierzkowicz, Dzierżkowicz. E Elgot F Frąckiewicz, Frykacz. G Gadziewicz, Gajdziewicz, Gamza, Gliczmer, Gliwicz, Godziewicz, Gogolthil, Gołuchowski, Gorbacki, Gorzycki, Gosławski, Gozdzielski, Gozdziewski, Gozdzikowski, Grabowski, Gromadzki, Gryniewicz. H Hadziewicz, Harasimowicz, Harasimowicz-Broniuszyc, Hordziejewicz, Huczyński, Hulewicz. J Janwicz, Jatowt, Jatowtowicz, Jundził, Jundziłł. K Kalita, Karkiewicz, Karmiński, Karniński, Kaweczyński, Kawęczyński, Klimaszewski, Klityński, Kłodnicki, Kolbus, Kopsowicz, Koruna, Kosowicz, Kossowicz, Kossowski, Koszewicz, Kozienicki, Kozinicki, Krakowiński, Krukowski, Kucharski. L Lastek, Lenartowski, Leskiewicz, Leszczyński, Leśkiewicz, Lgocki, Libiszewski, Libiszowski, Lichowski, Linck, Lingk, Linke, Lubatyński, Lubieszowski, Lubiński, Lubiszewski, Lubomeski, Lubomęski. Ł Łabiszewski, Łastek, Łubiński, Łukaszewicz. M Magnuszewski, Makacewicz, Malawski, Malcherowicz, Mankszyc, Markowski, Marszałkowski, Marszewski, Mąszyk, Mążyk, Mendwid, Mężyk, Miąciński, Miączyński, Michalski, Michałowski, Mierzejewski, Mierzejowski, Mierzwiński, Milewicz, Montwid, Montwit, Montywid. N Narecki, Narewicz, Narewski, Narkiewicz, Narkowicz, Niedzielski, Nieprowski, Niewieski. O Obichowski, Obidiowski, Obiechowski, Obiedło, Odyński, Okryński, Ostrowąski, Owczarski. P Passowicz, Pawłowski, Pągowski, Pella, Pełka, Persztein, Płonkowski, Pobikrowski, Pohl, Połujan, Porycki, Pracki, Pruszecki, Pruszkowski, Przybysławski, Puchała, Pułjan, Pułjanowski. R Radzikowski, Ragoza, Rahoza, Rakowski, Rawdowicz, Rylski, Ryłło, Ryło. S Sanczalski, Sawicki, Skrzetuski, Sleński, Slesiński, Sleszyński, Słabosz, Słaboszewicz, Słoński, Sługocki, Służewski, Snopek, Snopkowicz, Soczołowski, Spargalth, Sprzednicki, Srzednicki, Stabiński, Staboszewicz, Starunow, Strzałkowski, Strzembosz, Sulencki, Sulęcki, Sulikowski, Szabliński, Szafarowicz, Szafranowicz, Szednicki, Szlagier, Szlażewicz, Szlencewicz. Ś Śleński, Ślesiński, Śleszyński, Średnicki, Śrzednicki. T Tabor, Tarnowski, Torosowicz, Toroszowicz, Tszyrski, Turosowicz, Turoszowicz, Twardawa, Twardowa, Twardowski. W Wayski, Węgierski, Wieniawski, Wierciński, Wierszycki, Wierzbnowski, Wildziewicz, Wiłodziewicz, Wirszycki, Wiśniewski, Witoszyński, Wojecki. Z Zadorski, Zawadziński, Zebrowski, Zembrowski, Zubrzycki. Ż Żebrowski, Żodkiewicz, Żotkiewicz, Żubr.

Wieniawa is a Polish coat of arms. It was used by several noble, in Polish language szlachta families in the times of medieval Poland and the Polish–Lithuanian Commonwealth.

== History ==
The Wieniawa coat of arms originated from Moravia in the 11th century. First record is from 1382 (a seal).

== Blazon ==
English blazon: "Or, an ox head sable with a nose ring of the first in chief."

== Notable bearers ==
Notable bearers of this coat of arms include:

- Jerzy Białłozor
- Bolesław Wieniawa-Długoszowski
- House of Leszczyński
  - Stanisław I Leszczyński
  - Maria Leszczyńska
  - Bogusław Leszczyński
  - Rafał Leszczyński
- Jan Długosz, historian
- Denis Zubrytsky (1777–1862), Ukrainian historian

== Gallery ==
Variations

Coat of arms of King Stanisław Leszczyński

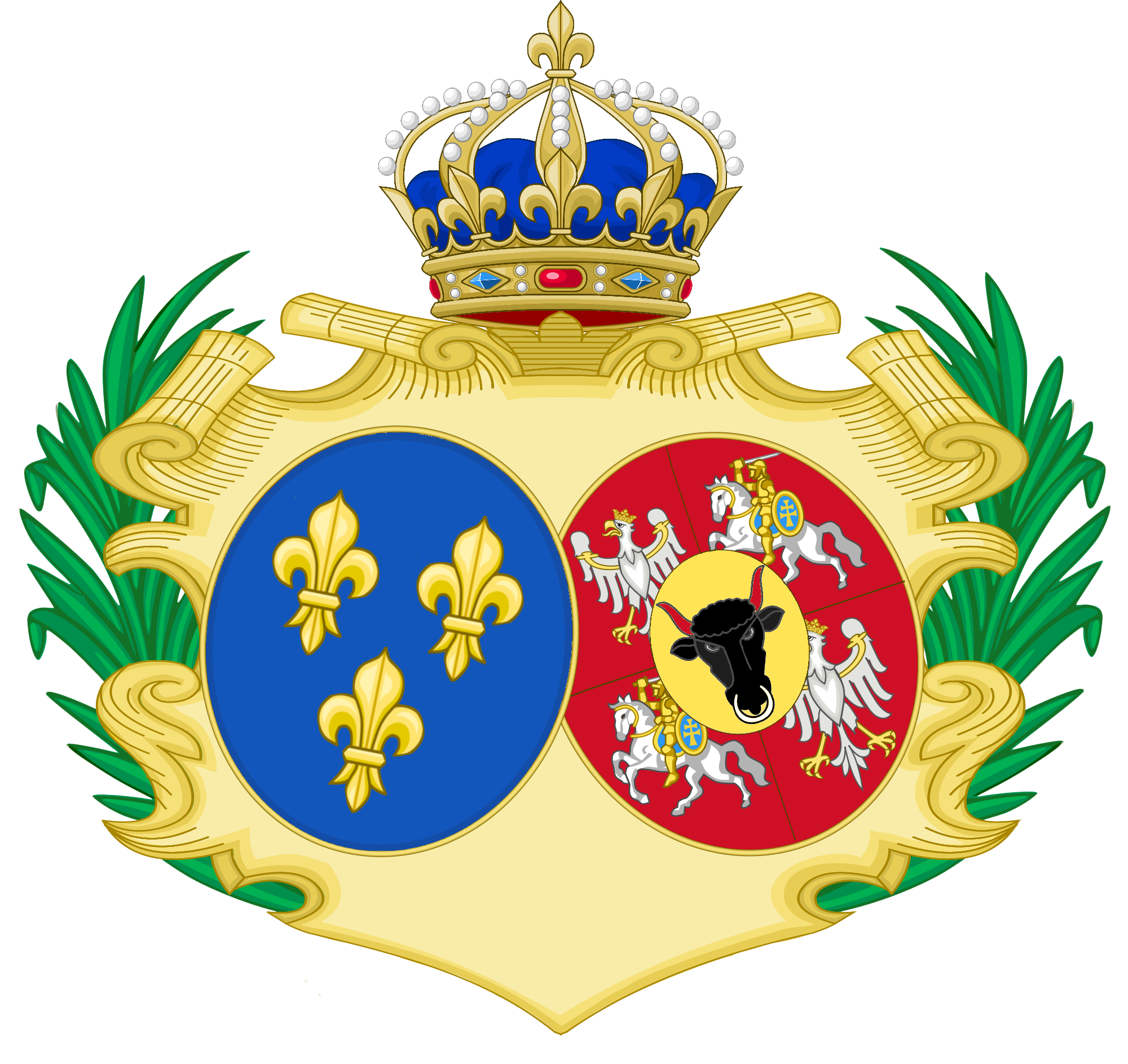
Coat of arms of Maria Leszczyńska as Queen of France

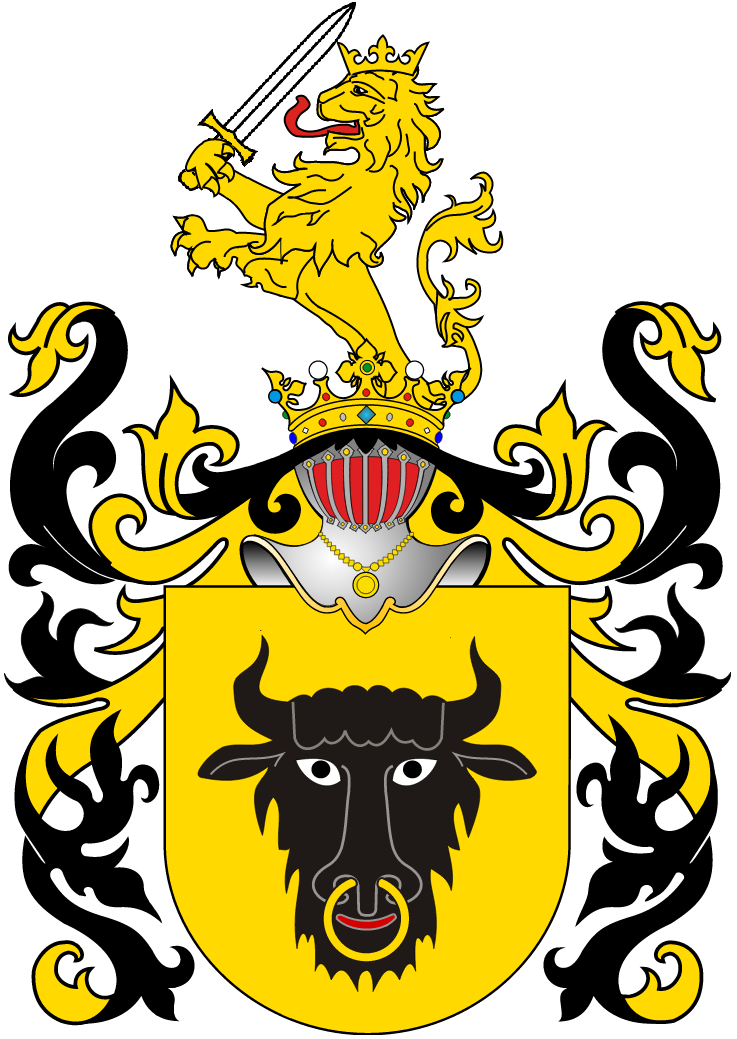
Coat of arms of the Leszczyński family

Ryc Coat of Arms (odm.)

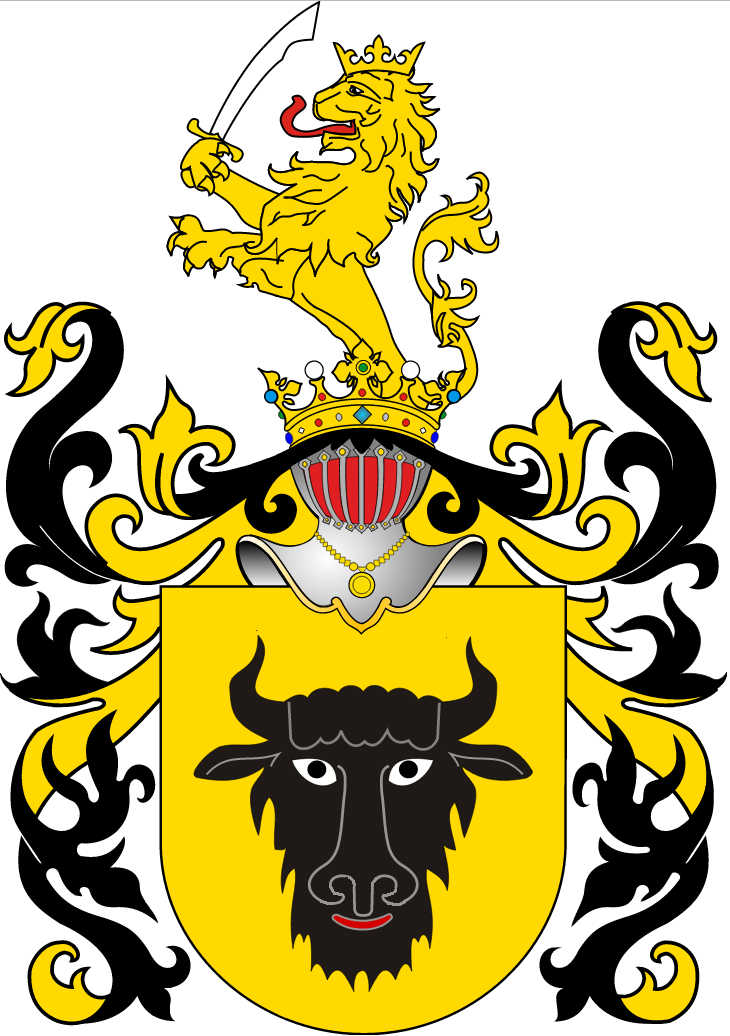
Wieniawa II (odm.)

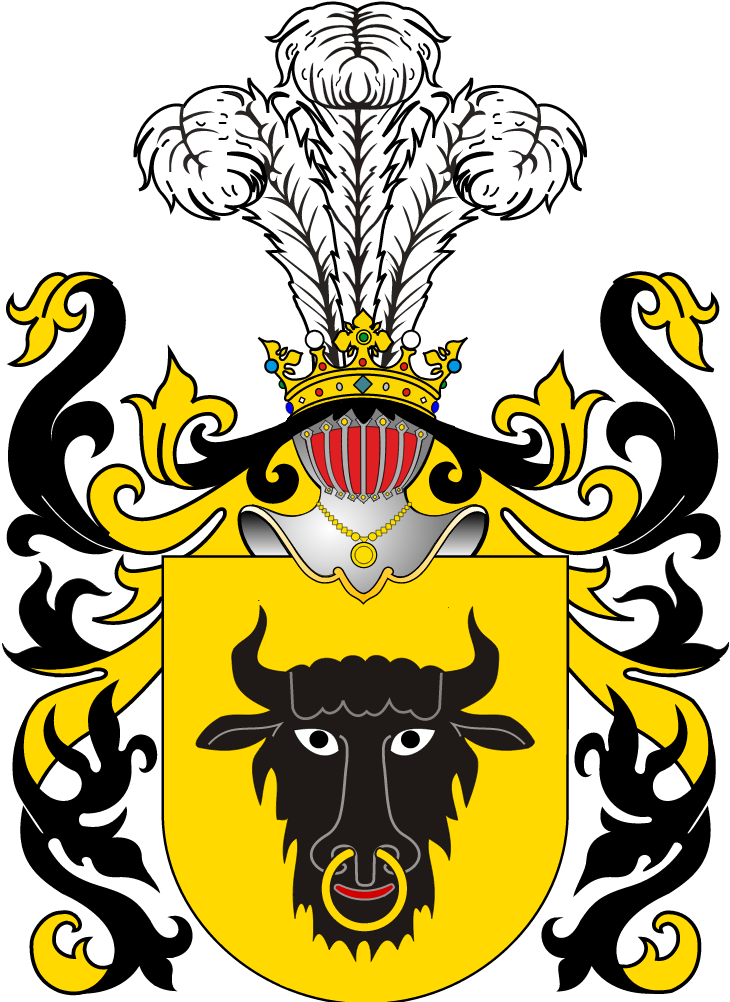
Wieniawa III (odm.)

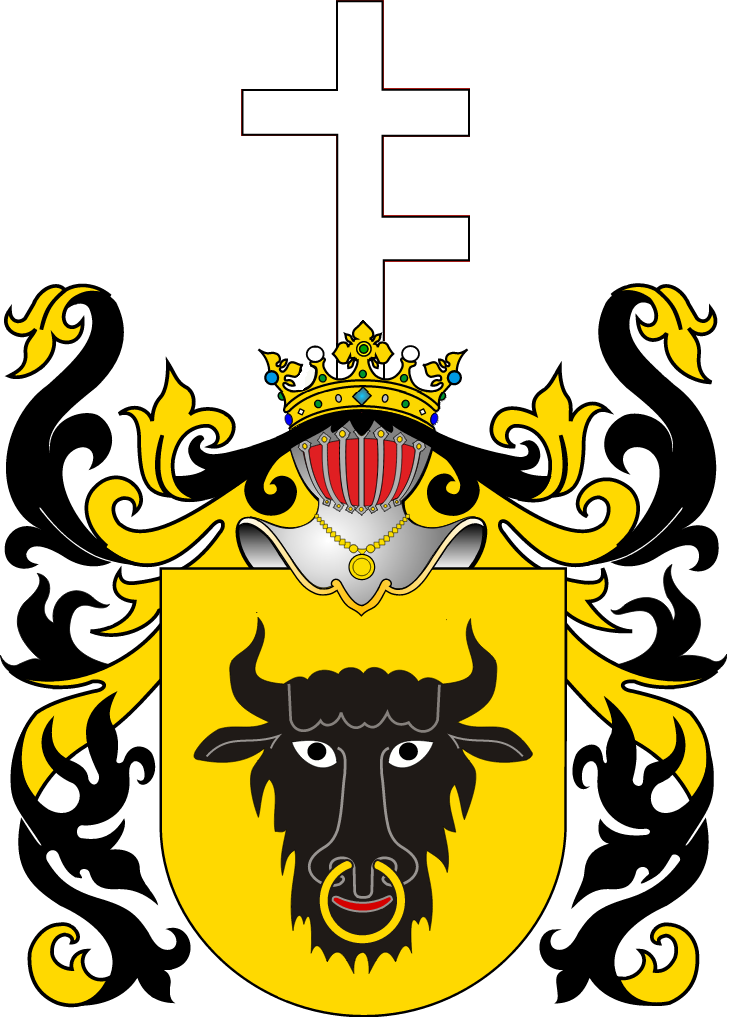
Coat of arms of the Szczepanowski family

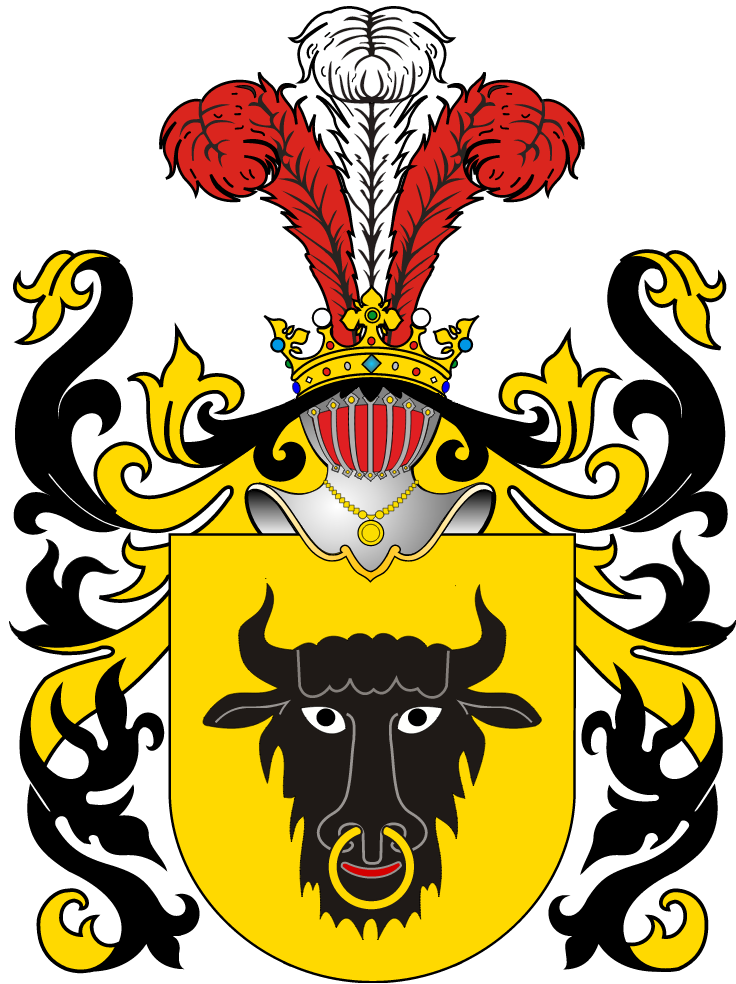
Coat of arms of Kołaczkowski family from Silesia

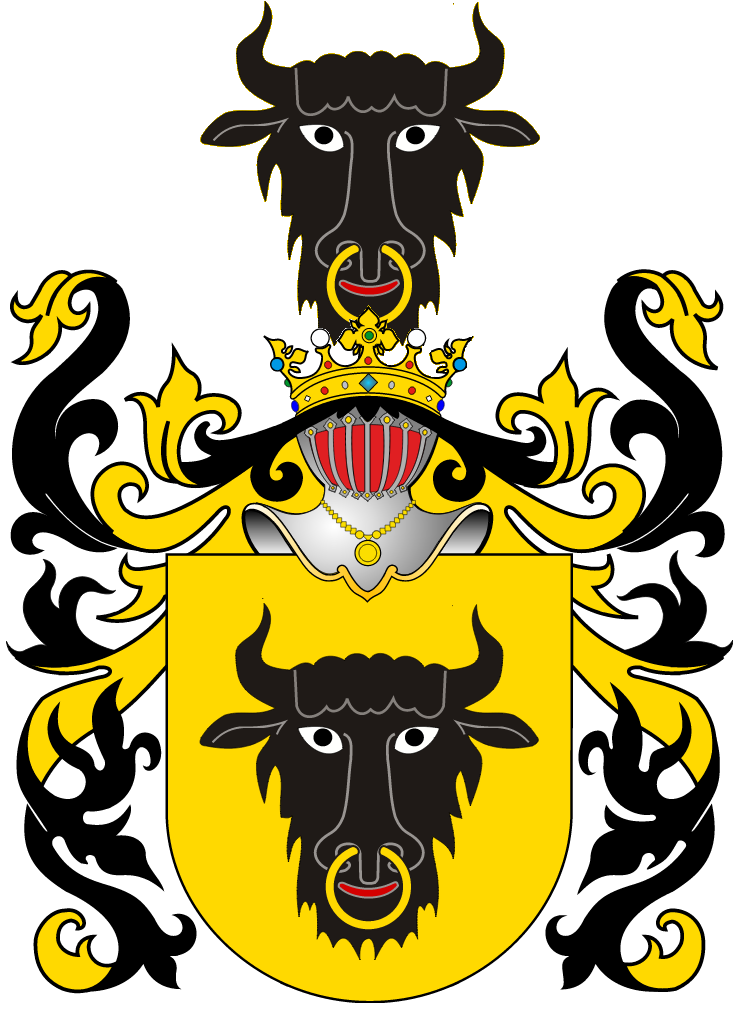
Coat of arms of Marklowski family

Cities and Villages

Coat of arms of Kalisz Voivodship

Coat of arms of Kalisz Voivodship in Congress Kingdom

Coat of arms of Lodz Voivodship in the Second Republic of Poland

Coat of arms of powiat Kalisz

Coat of arms of Leszno

Coat of arms of Dynów

Coat of arms of powiat Leszno

Coat of arms of gmina Mykanów

Coat of arms of gmina Przygodzice

Coat of arms of gmina Czermin

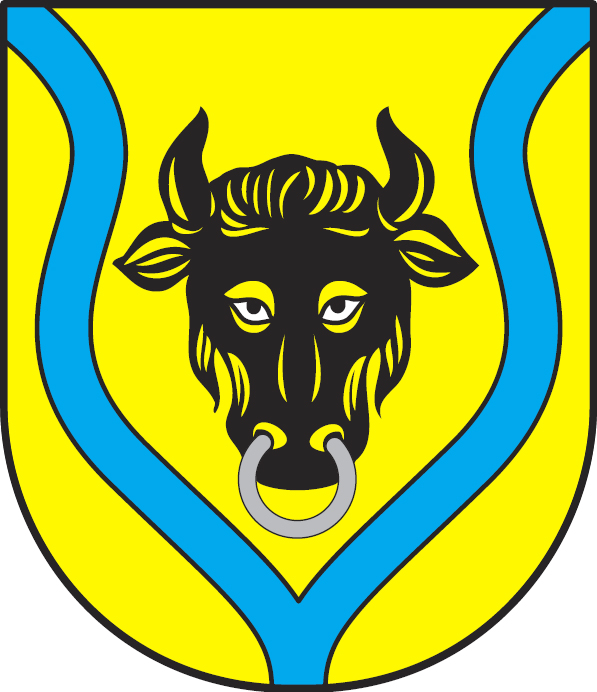
Coat of arms of gmina Popów

Coat of arms of gmina Gołuchów

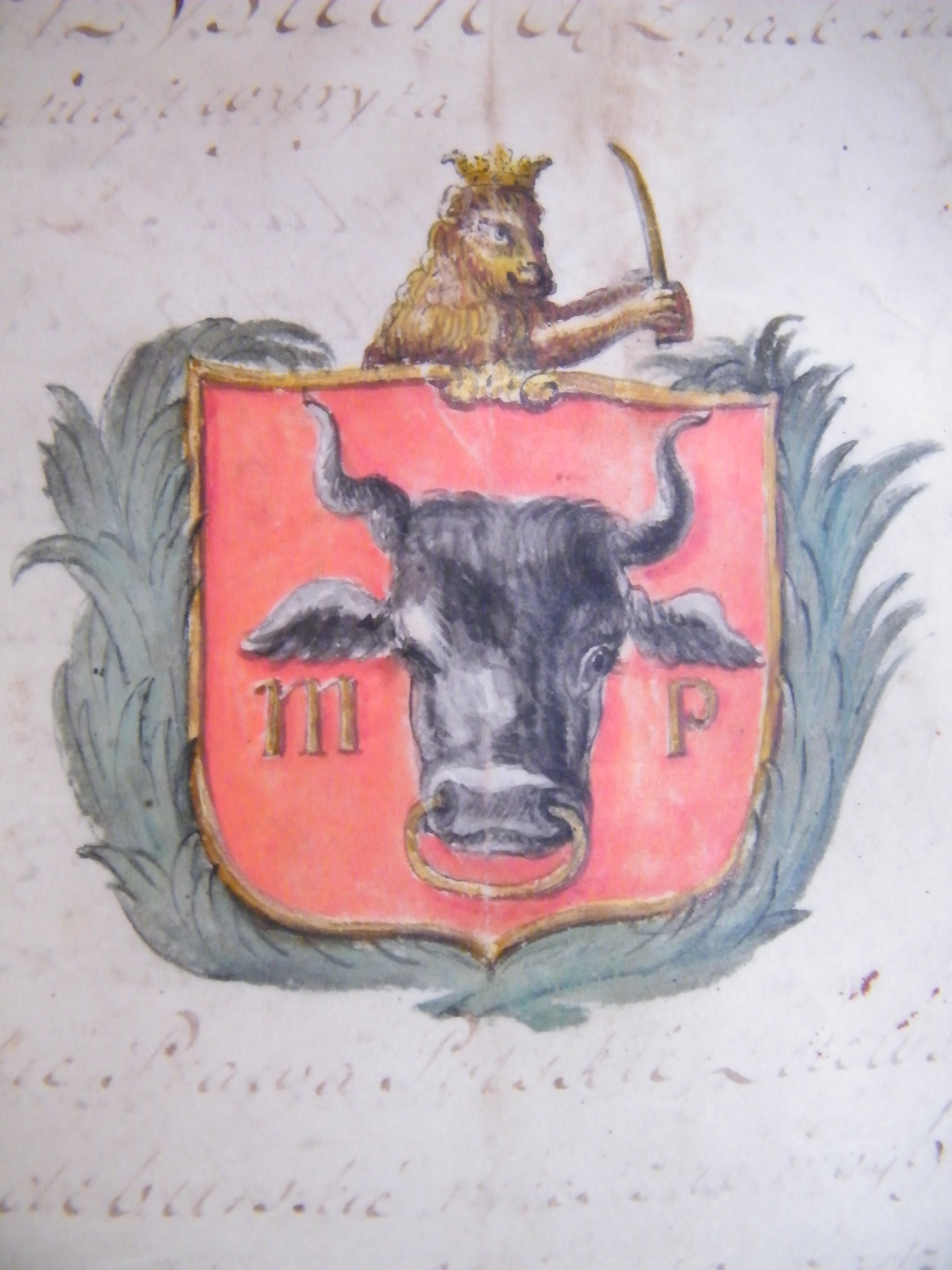
Coat of arms of Czermno (1745)

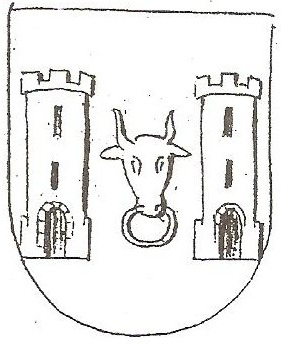
Design of the coat of arms Przysucha (1847)

Other

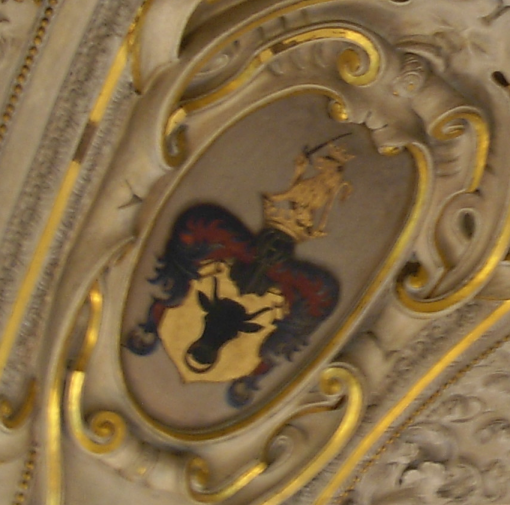
Wieniawa coat of arms in Baranow-Sandomierski castle

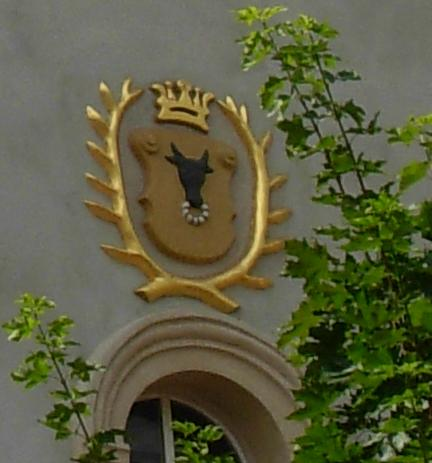
Wieniawa coat of arms in Leżajsk monastery.

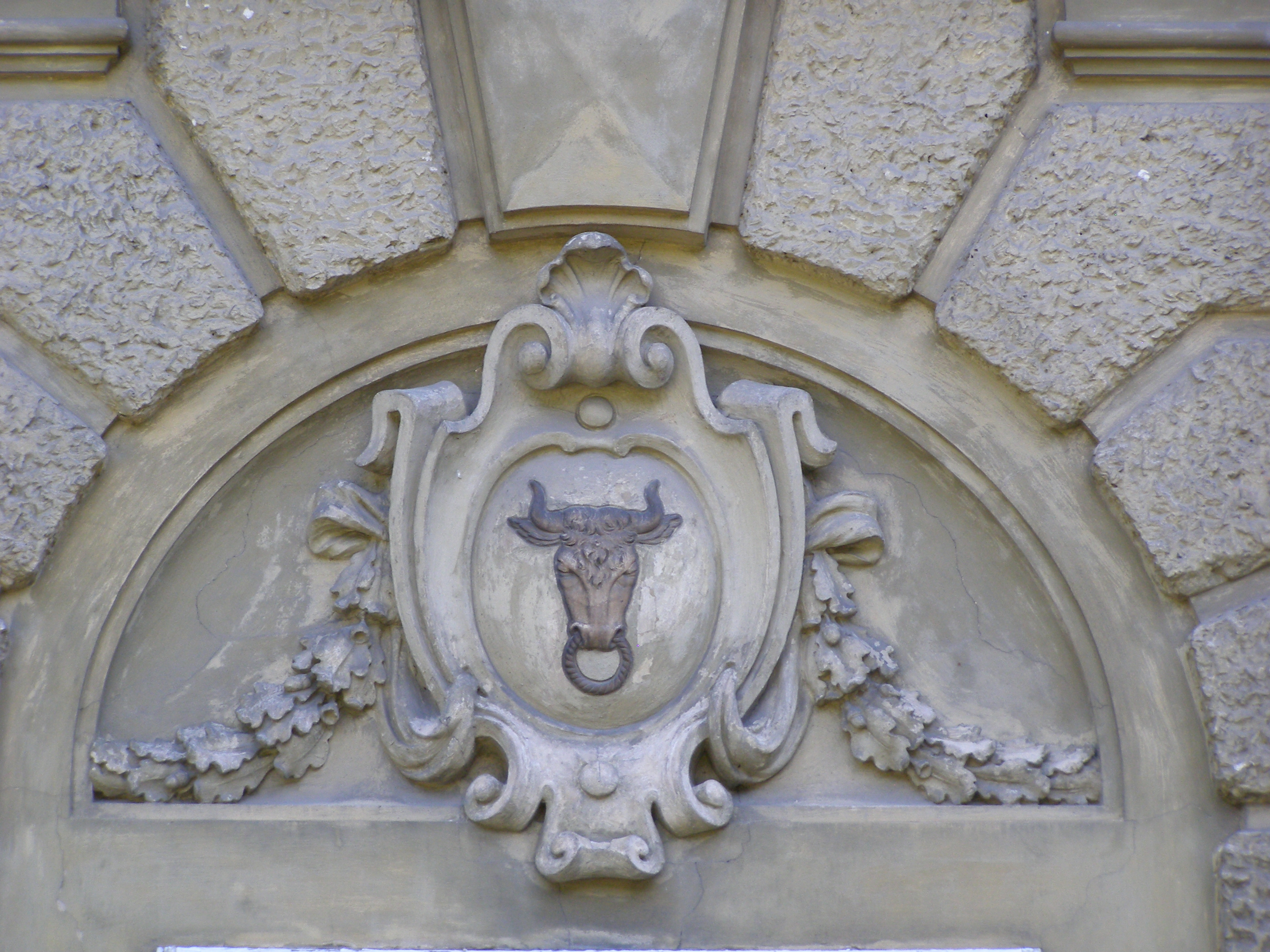
Łańcut Castle

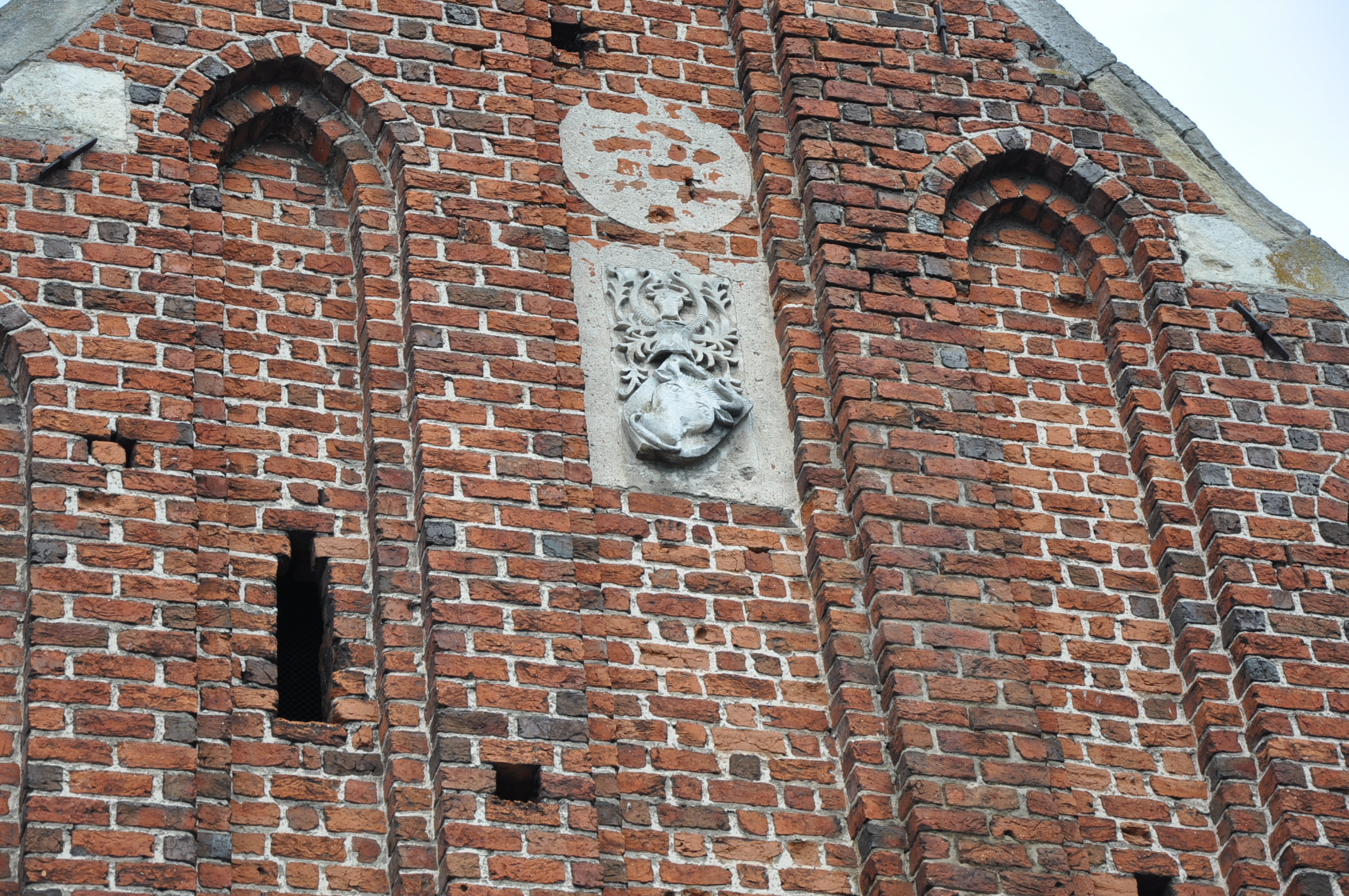
Dlugosz House in Wiślica

== See also ==
- Polish heraldry
- Heraldic family
- List of Polish nobility coats of arms

== Bibliography ==
- Alfred Znamierowski: Herbarz rodowy. Warszawa: Świat Książki, 2004, s. 176. ISBN 83-7391-166-9.
- Jan Długosz: Insignia seu Clenodia Regis et Regni Poloniae. Poznań: Zygmunt Celichowski, 1885, s. 20.
- Kasper Niesiecki, Herbarz, t. IX, s. 301-302
- Andrzej Kulikowski: Wielki herbarz rodów polskich. Warszawa: Świat Książki, 2005, s. 313. ISBN 83-7391-523-0.
- Józef Szymański: Herbarz średniowiecznego rycerstwa polskiego. Warszawa: PWN, 1993, s. 289–291. ISBN 83-01-09797-3.
- Tadeusz Gajl: Herbarz polski od średniowiecza do XX wieku : ponad 4500 herbów szlacheckich 37 tysięcy nazwisk 55 tysięcy rodów. L&L, 2007, s. 406–539. ISBN 978-83-60597-10-1.
- Kasper Niesiecki, Herbarz, t. IX, s. 301-302
- Juliusz Karol Ostrowski: Ksiega herbowa rodów polskich. Warszawa: 1897.
- Sławomir Górzyński: Arystokracja polska w Galicji: studium heraldyczno-genealogiczne. Warszawa: DiG, 2009, s. 152–153. ISBN 978-83-7181-597-3.
