= Józef Piłsudski Park =

Józef Piłsudski Park or Marshal Józef Piłsudski Park is the name of several parks in Poland dedicated to Józef Piłsudski:

- Marshal Józef Piłsudski Park, Września
- A part of Mokotów Field, Warsaw
- The largest park in Łódź
- A park in Mława
- A park in Rypin

== See also ==
- Józef Piłsudski's cult of personality
