= Wanda Pełczyńska =

Polish journalist, educator and politician

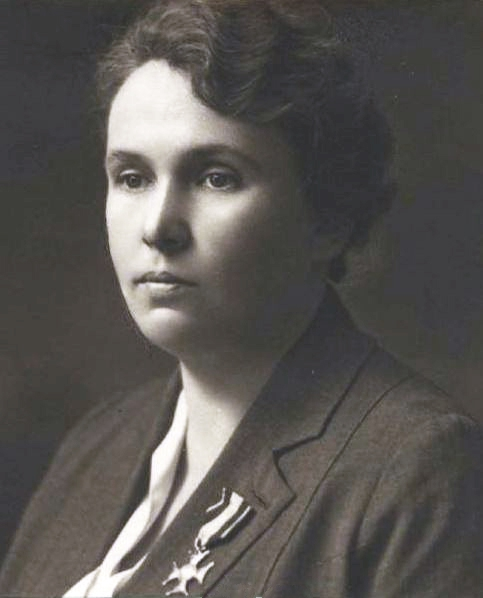
Wanda Pełczyńska

Wanda Izabela Pełczyńska (6 January 1894 – 5 September 1976) was a Polish journalist, educator and politician. She served in the Legislative Sejm for the Second Polish Republic from 1935 to 1938.

The daughter of Józef Filipkowski, a railway engineer, and Zofia Kwiatkowska, she was born Wanda Izabela Filipkowska in Puerto Rico. She took teaching courses in Warsaw and studied Polish at Jagiellonian University.

During World War I, she was a courier in the 1st Brigade, Polish Legions. In 1919, she was head of couriers for the Lithuanian-Belarusian Front. In 1920, she began teaching at a teacher's college in Warsaw. From 1923 to 1926, she was editor for Bluszcz, from 1927 to 1931, was editor of Kobiety Współczesnej and, from 1927 to 1934, she was co-editor of Młodej Matki.

Pełczyńska served on the board for the Polish section of FIDAC. She was also associated with the Nonpartisan Bloc for Cooperation with the Government (BBWR). During World War II, she was associated with the Union of Armed Struggle (ZWZ) in Vilnius. She was arrested by the Soviet authorities in July 1940 and imprisoned in Lukiškės Prison and later in Warsaw. She took care of the wounded during the Warsaw Uprising. After 1945, she lived in exile in London.

In 1923, she married Tadeusz Pełczyński, a general in the Polish army. Her son Krzysztof died in the Warsaw Uprising.

She was awarded the:

- Silver Cross of the Virtuti Militari
- the Knight's Cross and the Officer's Cross in the Order of Polonia Restituta
- the Cross of Independence with Swords

She died in London at the age of 82. She was originally buried in London but was later interred in the Powązki Military Cemetery.
