= Latvia–Poland relations =

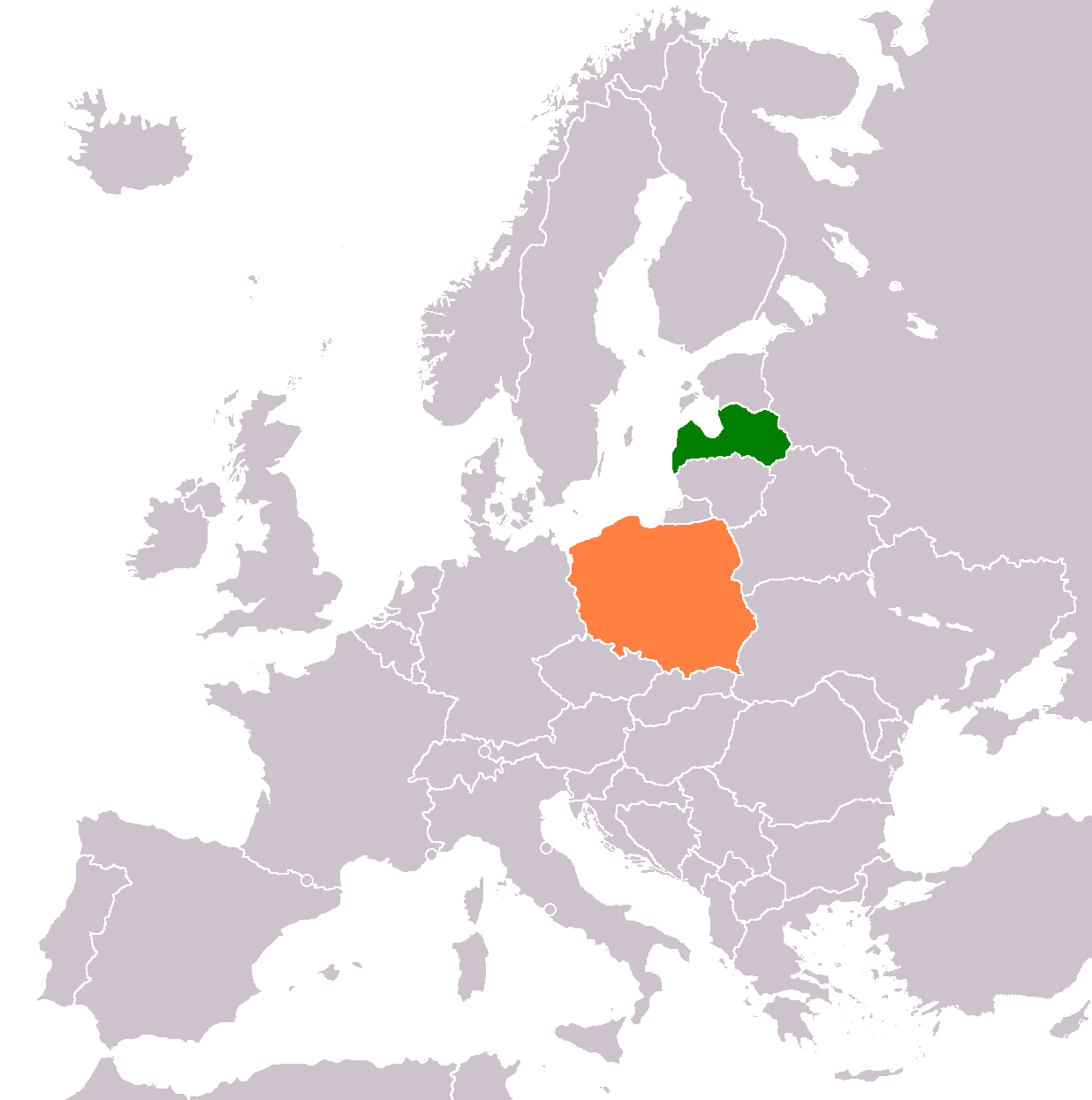

- Latvia: Poland

Latvia–Poland relations are foreign relations between Latvia and Poland. Both countries enjoy good relations and are close allies. There are around 57,000 Poles living in Latvia.

Both countries are full members of the European Union, NATO, OECD, OSCE, Bucharest Nine, Three Seas Initiative, Council of Europe, Council of the Baltic Sea States and HELCOM.

== History ==
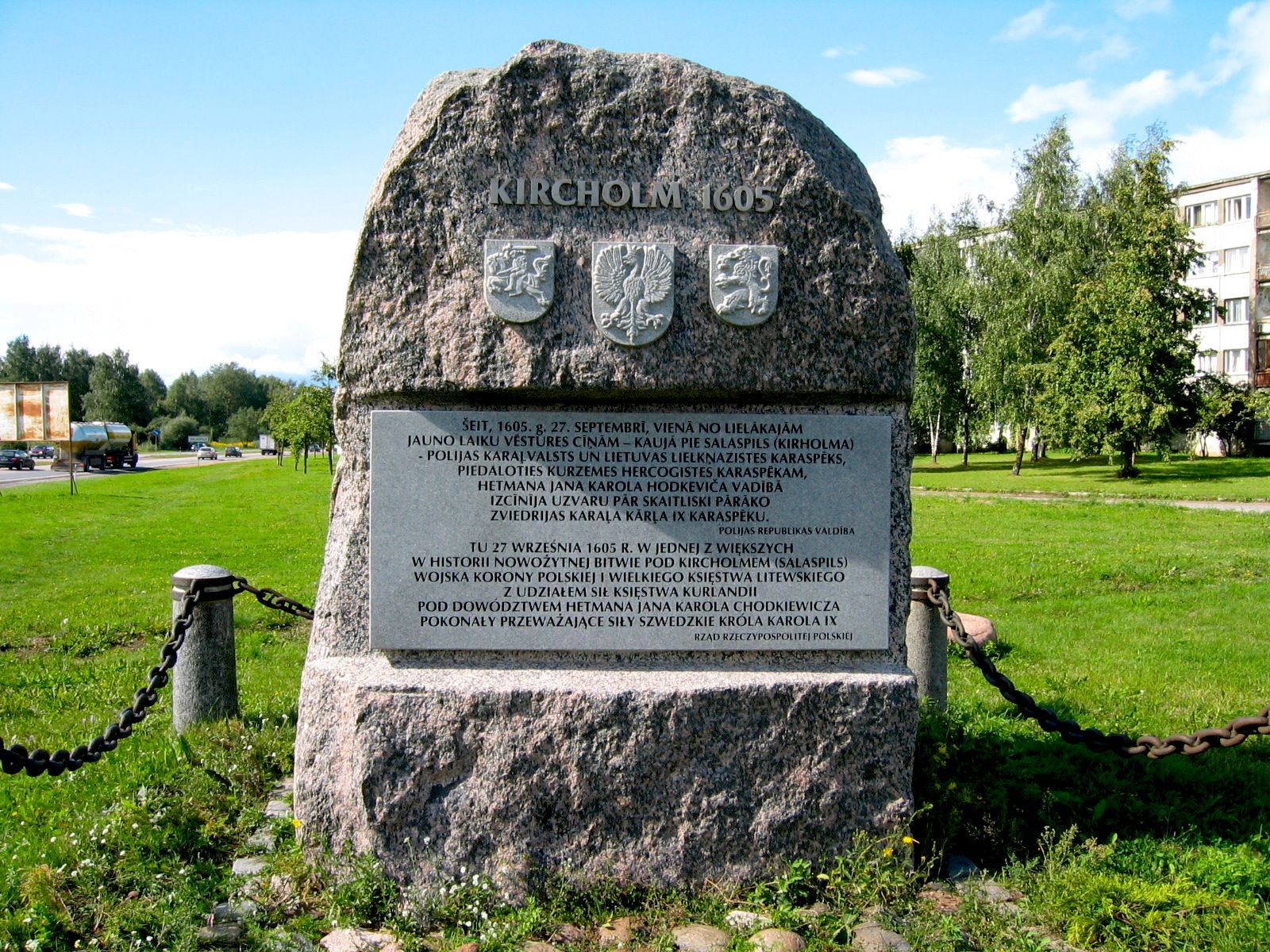
Battle of Kircholm memorial in Salaspils, Latvia

Present-day Latvia was part of the Polish–Lithuanian Commonwealth in its entirety until 1621, and then partially until the Partitions of Poland. It endured several Swedish invasions during the Polish–Swedish wars of 1600–1611, 1617–1618, 1621–1625, 1626–1629, 1655–1660 and 1700–1721. The Battle of Kircholm at modern Salaspils, Latvia, in which the Poles defeated the more numerous invading Swedes in 1605, is considered one of the greatest victories in Polish military history. It is commemorated in Salaspils.

In the 19th century, both Poles and Latvians were subjected to Russification policies within the Russian Empire.

=== 20th century ===
After World War I, both Latvia and Poland regained independence, and the nations became allies against the invading Soviet Russians. In January 1920 a joint Polish and Latvian force defeated the Red Army in the Battle of Daugavpils. In 1920, over 2,500 Polish soldiers of the former Polish Legion in Finland were evacuated from Finland via Liepāja to Poland. The Polish victory in the Battle of Warsaw in August 1920, secured both Polish and Latvian independence. Both countries shared a common border in the interbellum.

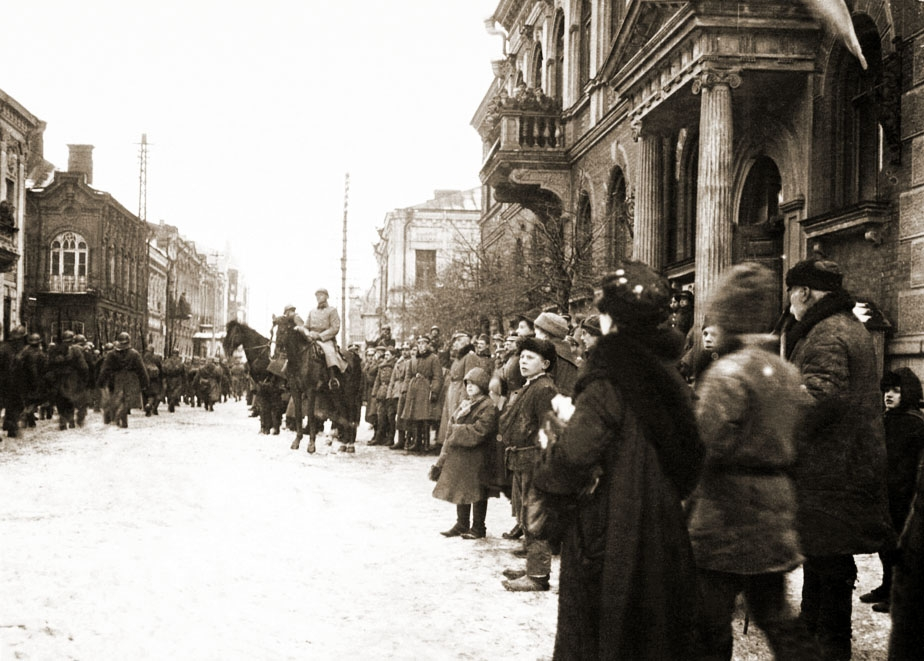
Polish 5th Legions' Infantry Regiment in Daugavpils after the Polish–Latvian victory against Soviet Russia in 1920

In 1922, Poland, Latvia, Estonia and Finland were the signatories of the Warsaw Accord, which however did not enter into force, as Finland did not ratify it under pressure of Germany, which was hostile to Poland. Instead, in 1925, Poland, Latvia, Finland and Estonia signed a convention on conciliation and arbitration in Helsinki.

In 1937–1938, both ethnic Poles and Latvians in the Soviet Union were subjected to genocidal campaigns carried out by the NKVD, known as the Polish Operation and the Latvian Operation respectively. Following the Molotov–Ribbentrop Pact, Poland and Latvia were both to be occupied by Nazi Germany and the Soviet Union. During the invasion of Poland by Germany and the Soviet Union at the start of World War II in September 1939, there were some 29,000 Polish citizens in Latvia, and soon 2,000 Polish refugees arrived to Latvia. Aleksandra Piłsudska, widow of pre-war Polish leader Józef Piłsudski, with daughters Wanda and Jadwiga fled through Latvia to Sweden. Poland was occupied by Germany and the Soviet Union since 1939, while Latvia was occupied solely by the Soviet Union since June 1940. Both nations were under common oppression, and many Poles and Latvians were forcefully deported by the Russians to Siberia. In the course of Operation Barbarossa, from mid-1941, both countries were entirely occupied by Germany. Latvian conscripts from the Soviet Red Army alike Polish POWs and civilians were among the prisoners of the Stalag II-B German prisoner-of-war camp in Czarne.

In 1942, Polish Prime Minister-in-Exile Władysław Sikorski's intervention to British and American authorities thwarted Soviet attempts to obtain Allied approval for the planned annexation of Latvia and eastern Poland.

In 1944–1945, both countries were again occupied by Soviet forces. Soviet repressions and deportations of both Latvian and Polish citizens continued. Poland's formal independence was eventually restored, although with a Soviet-installed communist regime, while Latvia was annexed into the Soviet Union, thus both had no relationship until the dissolution of the Soviet Union.

After the fall of the USSR, both countries re-established diplomatic relations on August 30, 1991.

== Modern relations ==
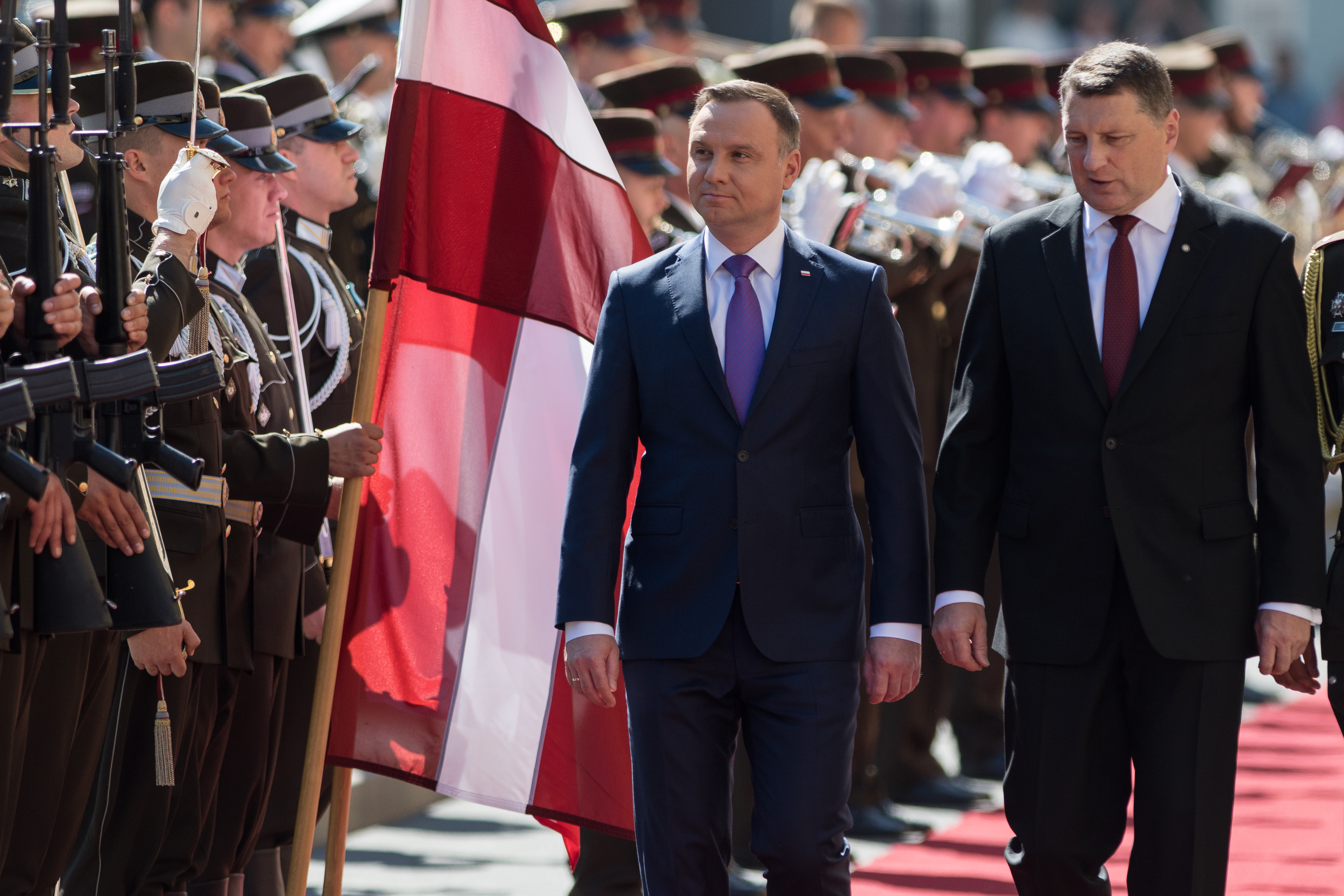
President of Poland Andrzej Duda with President of Latvia Raimonds Vējonis in Latvia in 2018

April 12, 2010, was declared a day of national mourning in Latvia to commemorate the 96 victims of the Smolensk air disaster, including Polish President Lech Kaczyński and his wife Maria Kaczyńska.

The Polish Air Force takes part in the NATO Baltic Air Policing mission to guard the airspace over the Baltic states including Latvia. Since 2017, a Polish military contingent has been stationed in Latvia as part of the NATO Enhanced Forward Presence defense forces.

In 2022, Latvian and Polish gas grids were connected, following the commissioning of the GIPL interconnection, also providing Latvia with a connection to the EU gas market.

== NATO and EU ==
Poland joined NATO in 1999, whereas Latvia joined NATO in 2004. Both countries became members of the European Union in 2004.

== Resident diplomatic missions ==
- Latvia has an embassy in Warsaw.
- Poland has an embassy in Riga.
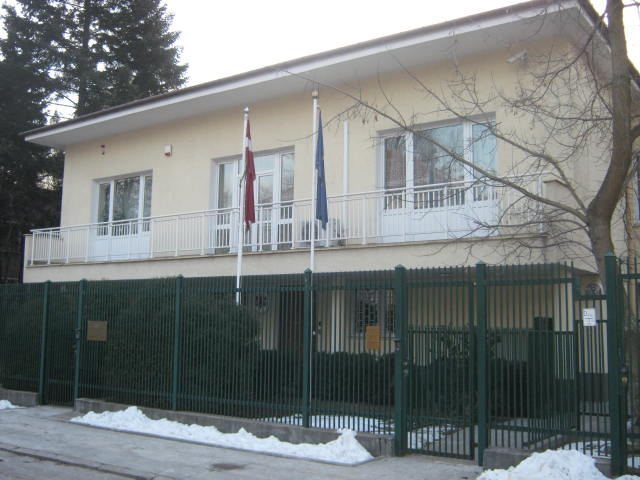
Embassy of Latvia in Warsaw

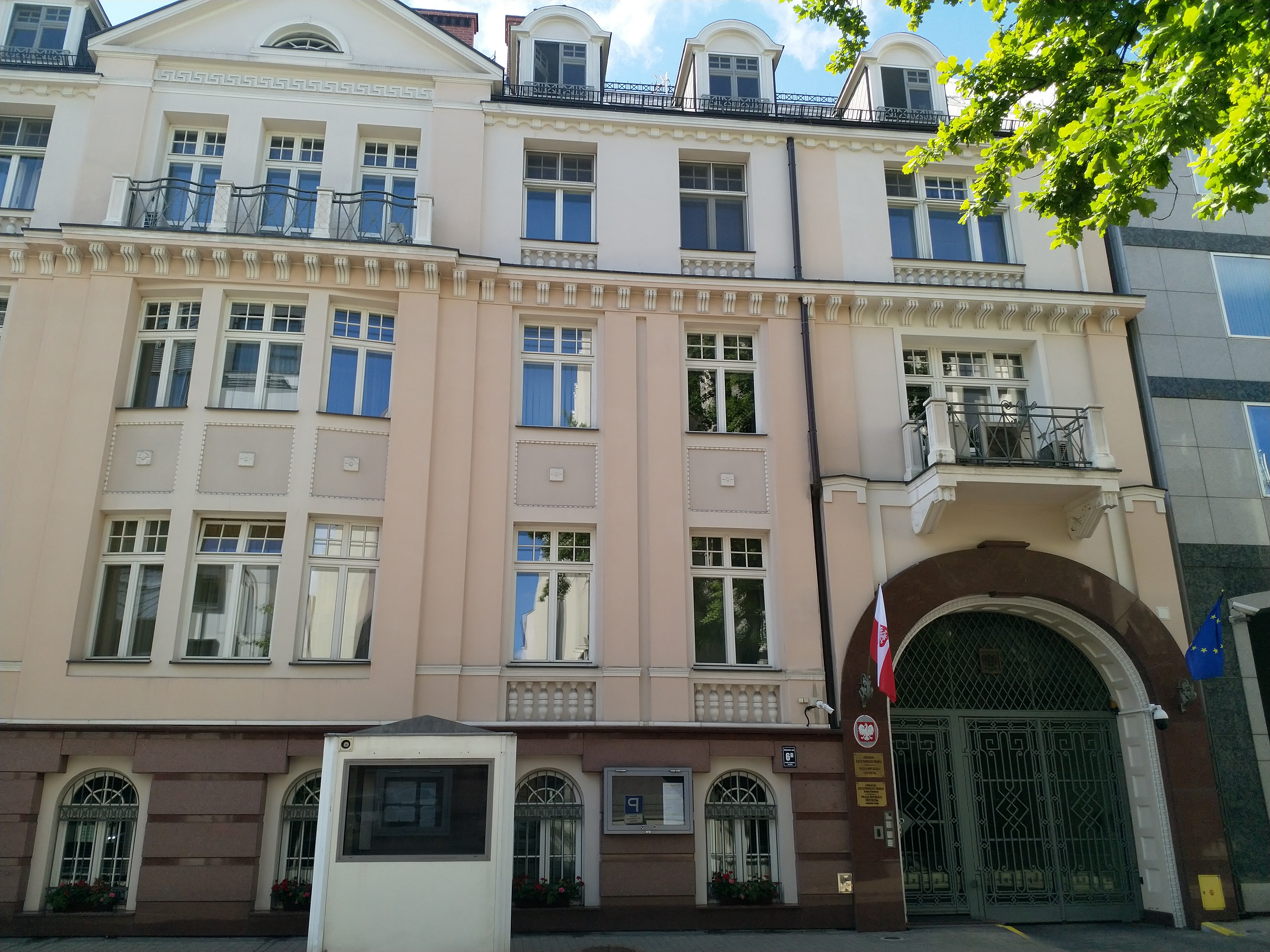
Embassy of Poland in Riga

== See also ==
- Foreign relations of Latvia
- Foreign relations of Poland
- Poles in Latvia
- 2004 enlargement of the European Union
- Poland in the European Union
