= Maria Piłsudska =

First Lady of Poland

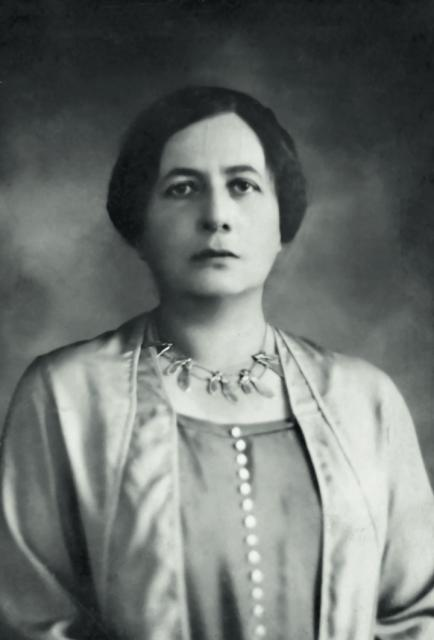

First Lady of Poland
- In role November 14, 1918 – 17 August 1921
- President: Józef Piłsudski (Chief of State)
- Preceded by: Position established
- Succeeded by: Aleksandra Piłsudska

Personal details
- Born: Maria Koplewska; 1865 Vilnius, Vilna Governorate, Russian Empire (now part of Vilnius County, Lithuania)
- Died: 17 August 1921 (aged 55–56) Kraków, Poland
- Spouses: Marian Juszkiewicz (m. 1883; div. 1887) Józef Piłsudski (m. 1899)
- Children: Wanda Juszkiewicz (1887–1908)
- Education: Bestuzhev Courses

Maria Piłsudska (née Koplewska; 1865 – 17 August 1921), was a Polish socialist and independence activist, the first wife of Poland's Chief of State Józef Piłsudski and ostensibly the first lady of Poland during most of his service as Poland's Chief of State.

== Biography ==
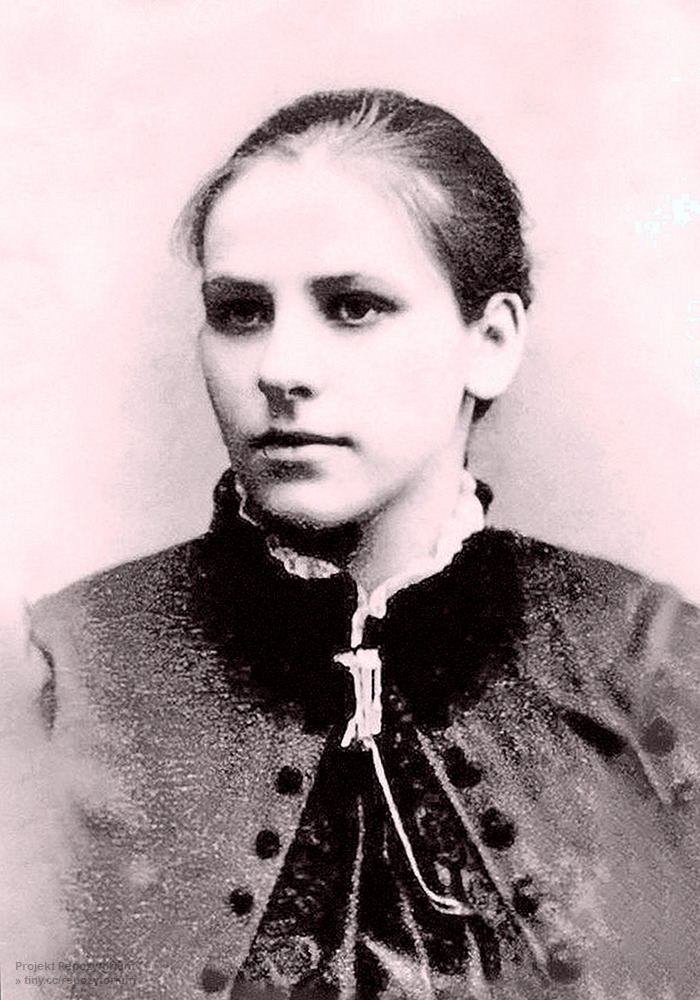
Maria Piłsudska née Koplewska (1865-1921) in her youth, ca. 1885

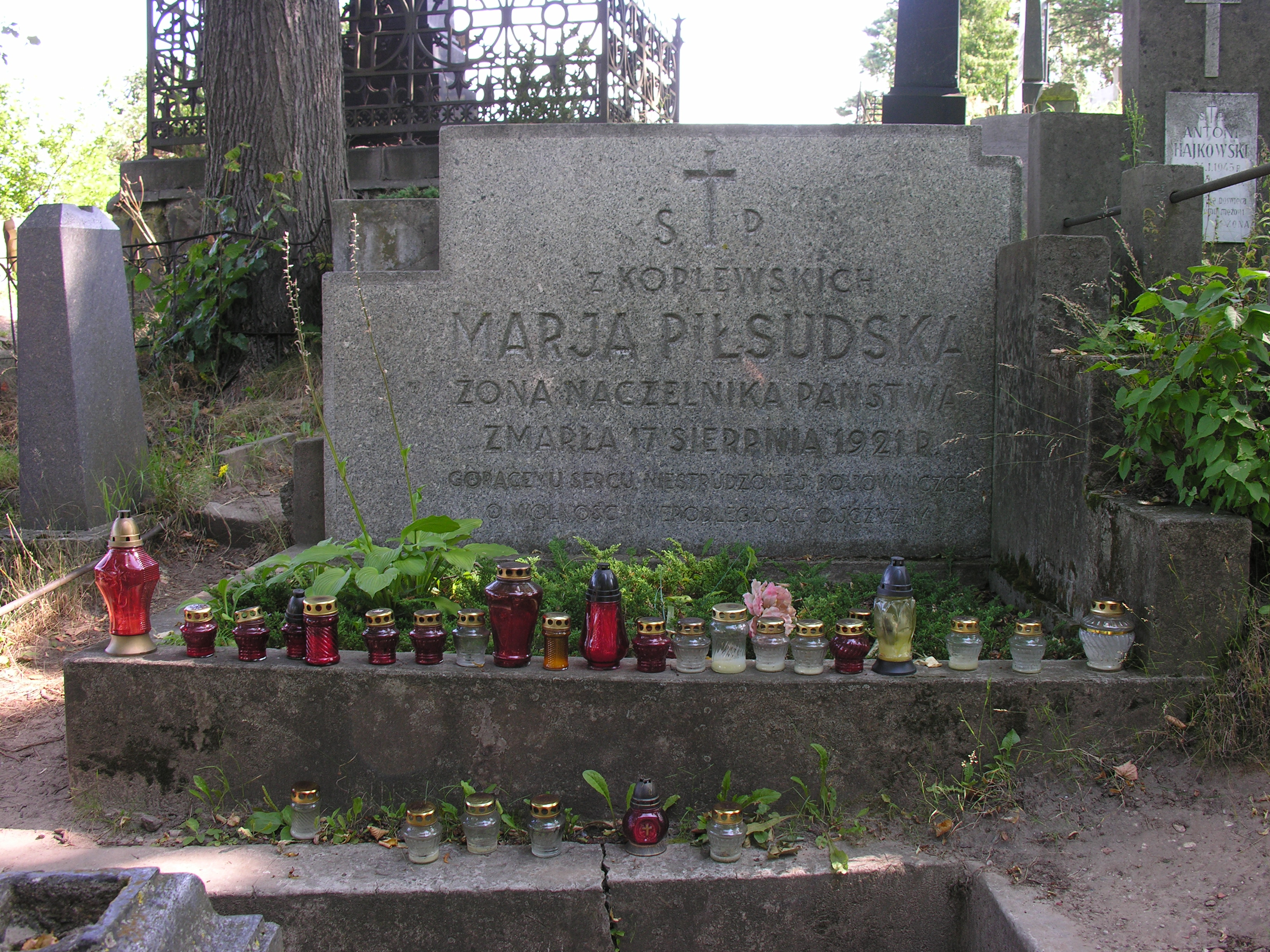
Maria Piłsudska's grave at Rossa Cemetery in Vilnius

She was born in 1865 in Vilnius, at that time part of the Russian Empire, to Konstanty Koplewski, a prominent physician. After graduating from high school, she moved to St. Petersburg, Russia. There she studied in the Bestuzhev Courses, a university for women, while cultivating friendships within certain revolutionary circles. It was there she met Marian Juszkiewicz, a young railway engineer whom she married in 1883. Their marriage fell apart soon after the birth of their daughter, Wanda, in 1887.

In 1892, Maria met Józef Piłsudski. After seven years, they married on 15 July 1899 at the village of Paproć Duża near Łomża. Since Maria was a divorcee and the Catholic Church did not recognize divorce, she and Piłsudski converted to Protestantism. Soon afterward they settled in Łódź, where Józef continued his revolutionary activities. In February 1900, they were arrested when a clandestine printing press was discovered in their apartment. After eleven months Maria was released, while Piłsudski remained imprisoned in the infamous Tenth Pavilion at the Warsaw Citadel in the Russian-occupied part of Poland. Upon his subsequent escape from a mental hospital in St. Petersburg to which he had been transferred, the couple moved to Lwów, in eastern Galicia in Austria-Hungary.

== Political activism ==
In mid-November 1901, they relocated to London, the seat of the Polish Socialist Party's leadership. In April 1902, pursuant to the needs of the PPS, they returned to Lwów, and in 1904 moved to Kraków.

In May 1906 Piłsudski met Aleksandra Szczerbińska, who was working with the PPS paramilitary organization. After a time, Piłsudski and Aleksandra began an affair. In 1908 Maria Piłsudska's daughter by her first marriage, Wanda, died. By 1909, Maria was aware of Józef's affair but refused to divorce him, and they continued to share a home until the outbreak of the First World War. Maria remained popular among the PPS and its paramilitary faction, and had helped Józef gain adherents amongst them. Their marriage continued to deteriorate, however, and after his release from Magdeburg Prison in November 1918, Piłsudski abandoned her. Aleksandra Szczerbińska became his de facto wife, although for propriety's sake they had to maintain separate homes. Maria Piłsudska withdrew from public life and continued to reside in Kraków.

Maria Piłsudska died in Kraków on 17 August 1921. She was buried at the Rasos Cemetery in Vilnius. Piłsudski did not attend the funeral; two months later he married Aleksandra, by whom he had had a daughter, Wanda, in 1918, and a second daughter, Jadwiga, in 1920.
