= Suicide of Walery Sławek =

Suicide of Polish politician Walery Sławek

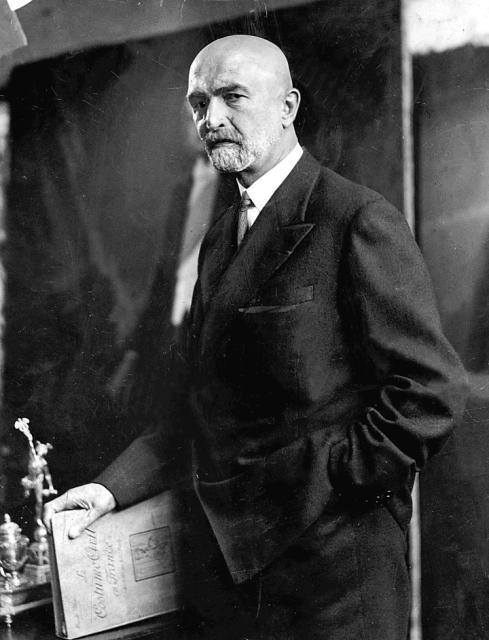
Walery Sławek (1879–1939)

On 2 April 1939, Walery Sławek, a prominent Sanation politician, close associate of Józef Piłsudski, three-time Prime Minister of the Second Polish Republic, and key architect of the April Constitution, shot himself in the mouth with a pistol in his Warsaw apartment.

Sławek did not die immediately; efforts were made to save him, but he succumbed the following morning in a hospital. In his farewell letter, he did not disclose the reasons for his suicide, leaving the motives subject to ongoing speculation and conjecture.

== Sławek's situation after Piłsudski's death ==
Józef Piłsudski had envisioned Sławek as a potential President. Sławek expected that after Piłsudski's death, Ignacy Mościcki would resign and nominate him as successor. However, this did not happen. Mościcki formed an informal alliance with General Edward Rydz-Śmigły to marginalize Sławek from the ruling camp. Consequently, Sławek gradually lost direct influence over politics. On 12 October 1935, he resigned as Prime Minister, and on 30 October, he dissolved the Nonpartisan Bloc for Cooperation with the Government. He was also blamed for the low voter turnout (45.9%) in parliamentary elections.

On 22 June 1938, following Stanisław Car's death, Sławek was elected Marshal of the Sejm, supported by many Sanation deputies protesting his treatment by Rydz-Śmigły and Mościcki. However, the Sejm was dissolved by Mościcki on 18 September. In the subsequent elections, Sławek faced attacks from former allies. Stanisław Giza, a researcher at the Józef Piłsudski Institute for Research in Modern History of Poland, recalled:

Living in central Warsaw, I found leaflets in my mailbox before the elections with a single sentence: "Do not vote for Sławek".

== Suicide ==
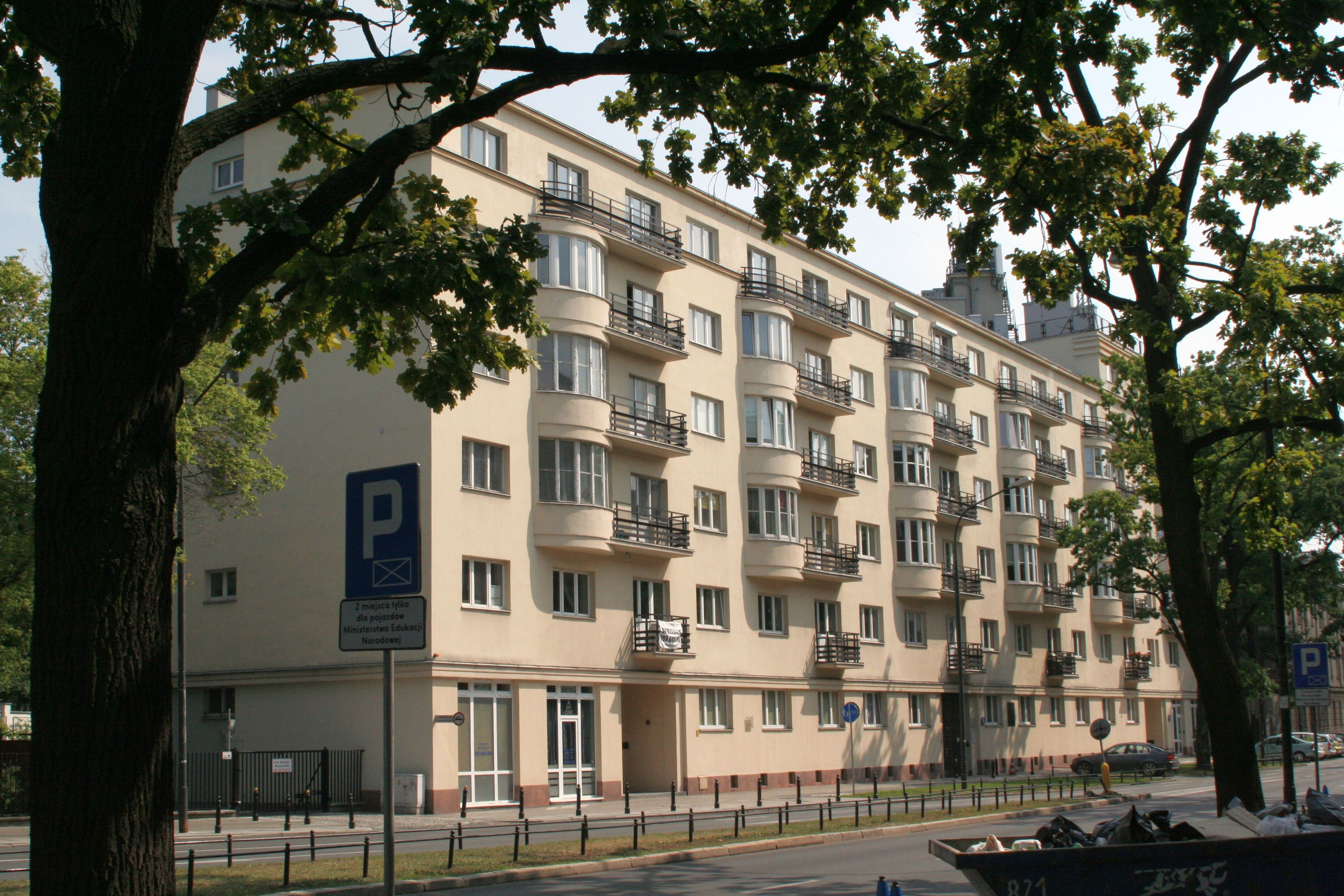
Cooperative "Proporzec" tenement at 16 Johann Christian Schuch Avenue, where Walery Sławek lived and died

On 2 April 1939, at 8:45 p.m. (the time of Piłsudski's death), Sławek shot himself in the mouth in his Warsaw apartment at 16 Johann Christian Schuch Avenue. He used an old Browning pistol from his Polish Socialist Party days. His friend Janusz Jędrzejewicz described the weapon:

I often saw that old Browning, always well-maintained, meticulously oiled .... I held it with some emotion, like a retired, once-lethal tool whose final bullet had fulfilled its purpose. Could I have imagined then that its last shot was still awaiting its destiny?

Before the attempt, Sławek wrote a farewell letter:

I am taking my own life. I ask no one to be blamed. 2 April 1939. W. Sławek.

He added:

I burned private papers and those entrusted to me. If not all, I ask those affected to forgive me. May the All-Seeing God forgive my sins, including this last one.

He also left a letter addressed to Mościcki, the contents of which were never disclosed.

The bullet lodged in his palate without piercing his skull. He was rushed to the Józef Piłsudski Military Hospital's Institute of Trauma Surgery. The shot, fired at an angle from an old pistol, failed to penetrate the palate. Sławek underwent a blood transfusion and a two-hour surgery. His condition briefly improved around 4 a.m. on 3 April, but he died at 6:45 without regaining consciousness.

== Funeral ==
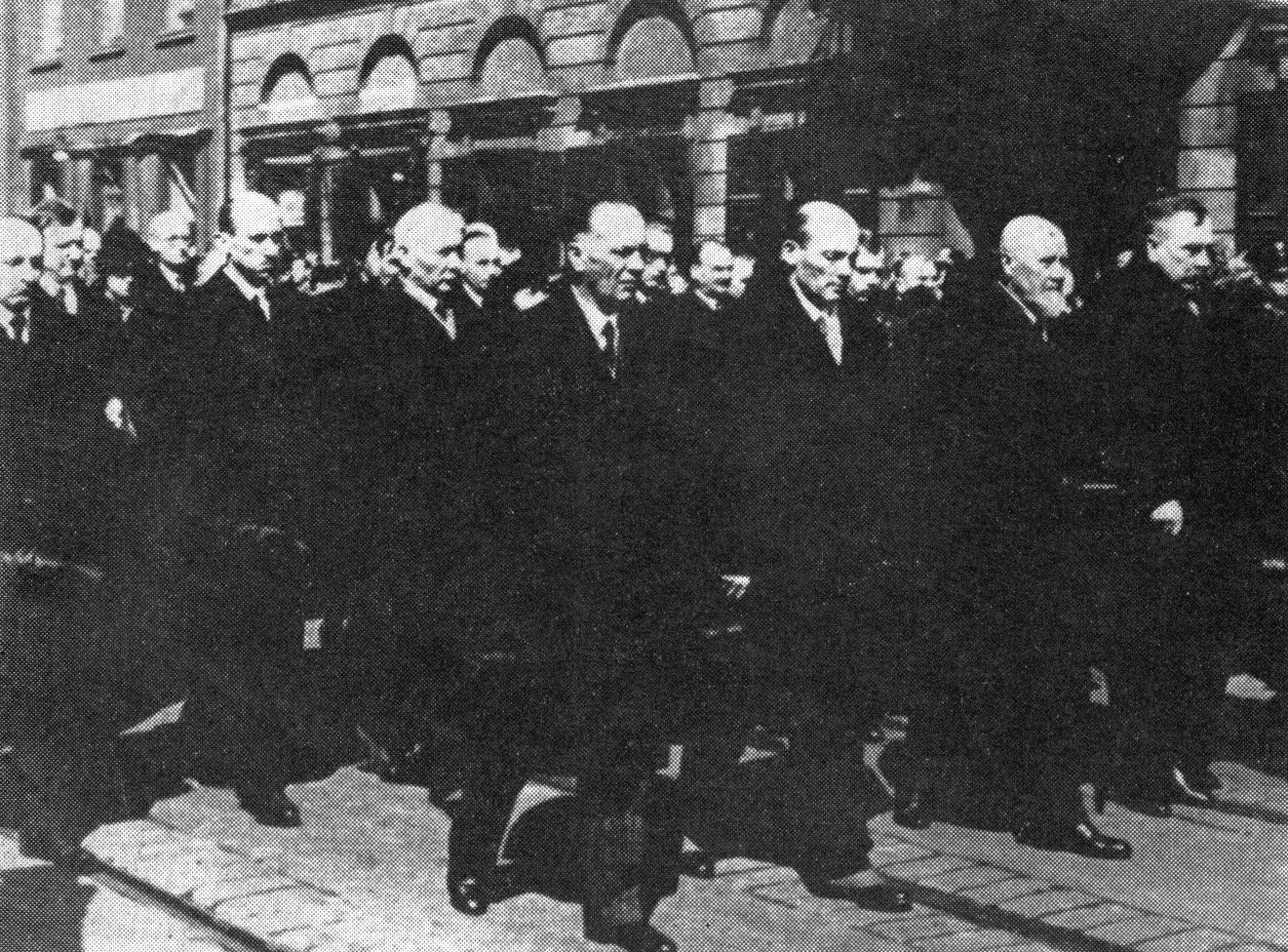
Funeral of Sławek, with (front row) Kazimierz Świtalski, Janusz Jędrzejewicz, Aleksander Prystor, and Jędrzej Moraczewski

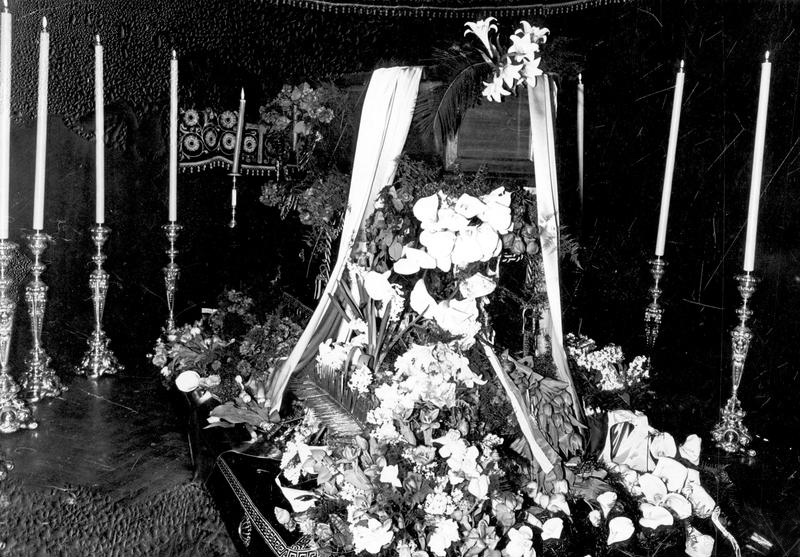
Coffin with Sławek's body

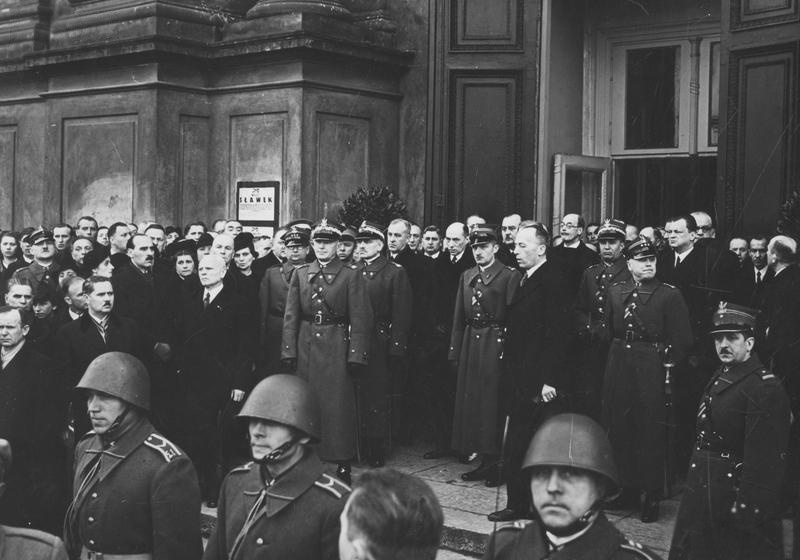
Funeral attendees, including Marshal Edward Rydz-Śmigły, Gen. Tadeusz Kasprzycki, and Gen. Felicjan Sławoj Składkowski, outside St. John's Archcathedral, Warsaw

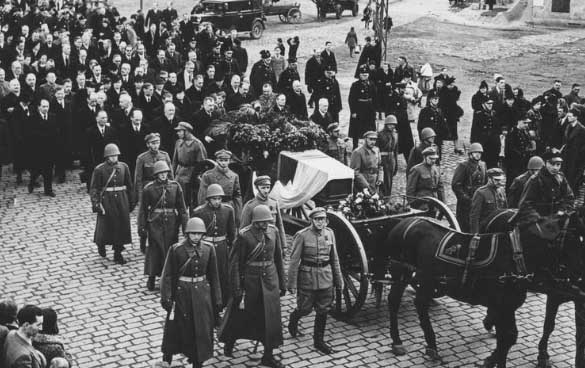
Funeral procession

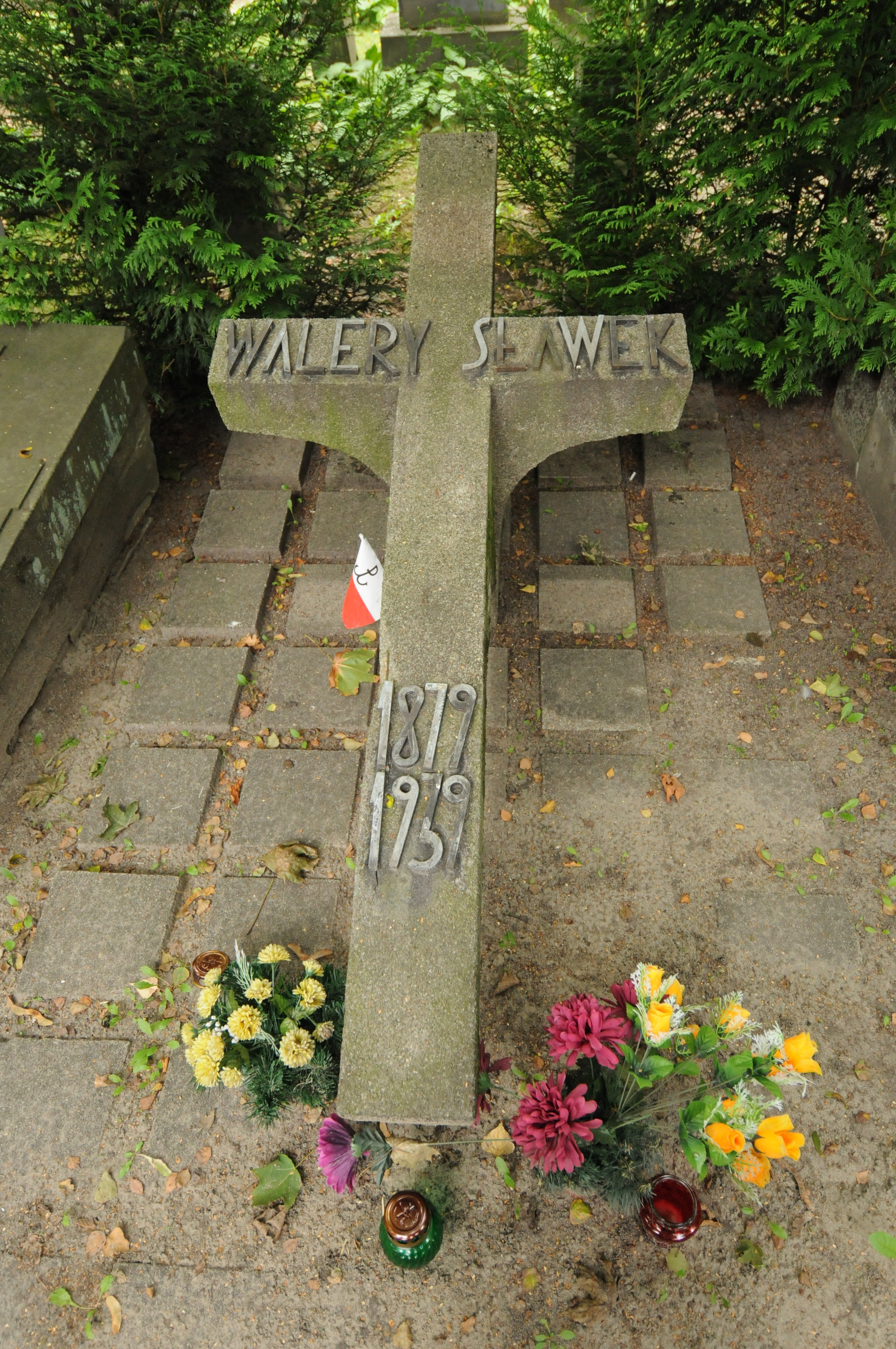
Sławek's grave at Powązki Military Cemetery, Warsaw, 2009

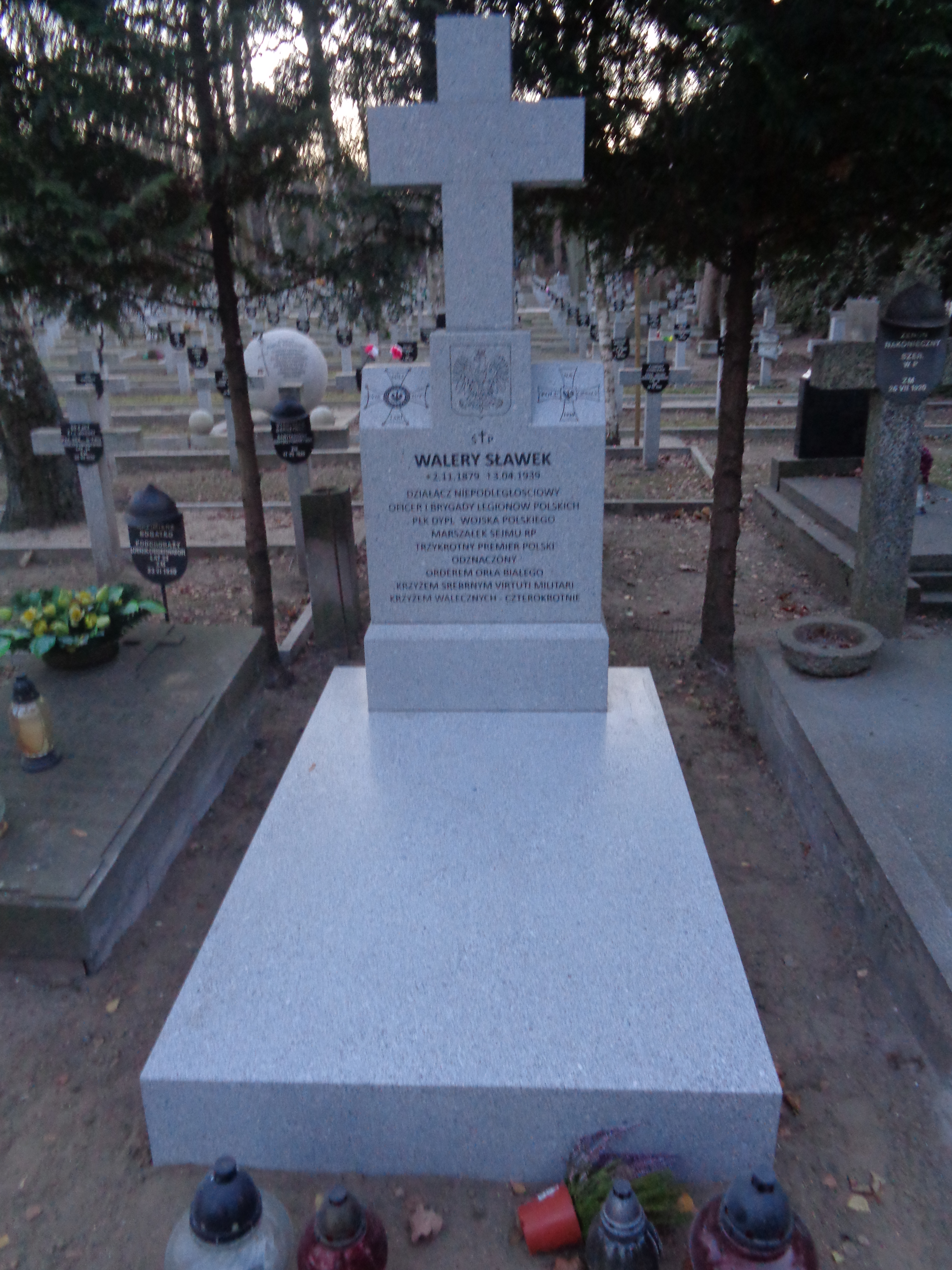
Sławek's grave at Powązki Military Cemetery, Warsaw, 2018

After his death, Sławek's body was displayed in his apartment until the funeral, where comrades, colleagues, and the public paid their respects. The funeral took place on 5 April 1939 in Warsaw. The procession, led by Canon Popławski, proceeded from the Field Cathedral of the Polish Army on Długa Street through Warsaw to the Powązki Military Cemetery. Rydz-Śmigły attended just before the service began. As the coffin was removed from the catafalque, Sławek's closest friends surrounded it, preventing Rydz-Śmigły's approach, blaming him for Sławek's death. The coffin was carried by, among others, Aleksander Prystor, Janusz Jędrzejewicz, Michał Tadeusz Brzęk-Osiński, and Gen. Lucjan Żeligowski. The funeral became a demonstration by Piłsudski loyalists against the Camp of National Unity. Wreaths included inscriptions such as: "To Walery Sławek – friends from PPS", "To a Friend of the Family – Aleksandra Piłsudska", and "To My Beloved Godfather – Jadwinia Piłsudska".

== Motives for suicide ==
According to Andrzej Garlicki, Sławek's suicide stemmed from his failure in the Sanation's internal struggle to realize his political vision. Marian Drozdowski similarly points to his "personal political defeat". Andrzej Micewski, however, argues Sławek "voluntarily withdrew from the power struggle". Stanisław Mackiewicz suggests Sławek felt he had failed Piłsudski:

The reasons for the suicide are clear. Piłsudski tasked him with becoming president, and he couldn't achieve it (...). He felt like a loyal dog unable to fulfill his duty.

Aleksandra Piłsudska disputed this view. Janusz Jędrzejewicz believed the suicide was a protest against Rydz-Śmigły's policies, which Sławek saw as undermining Piłsudski's legacy. In late 1938 and early 1939, Sławek confided in former PPS colleagues, expressing frustration with the ruling camp's discord, as recounted by Norbert Barlicki to Ludwik Cohn:

I met Sławek, imagine that. He approached me, said he was disillusioned, poured out grievances against his friends, and spoke of rifts in the Sanation.

Sławek's biographer, Jerzy Marek Nowakowski, attributes the suicide to overlapping factors:

The psychological breakdown following Piłsudski's death, exacerbated by his exclusion from power, likely never fully subsided. This was deepened by harassment from former political allies, a sense of failing to fulfill the Marshal's political testament, and feelings of co-responsibility for Poland's international weakness and domestic political system.

Leszek Moczulski argues there was no mystery behind the suicide:

Various reasons for the suicide have been sought, but there's no mystery. After 20 years of independence, Poland faced mortal danger. Sławek knew the threat's scale and believed, rightly, that he was a key source of Sanation's division post-Piłsudski. Active involvement would deepen divisions; inaction would leave him a hindrance to unity. With collective action closed to him, he removed himself as an obstacle in the most definitive way. This wasn't suicide but a soldier's sacrifice.

== Doubts ==
Dariusz Baliszewski questions whether Sławek's death was truly a suicide, citing suspicious circumstances. He notes that Sławek burned numerous personal and official documents before the attempt. Baliszewski cites Teresa Perl, wife of Feliks Perl, who told Stanisław Giza that Sławek planned a coup d'état with Tomasz Arciszewski and Kazimierz Pużak to overthrow the Składkowski government. Allegedly, Rydz-Śmigły learned of this and ordered Colonel Józef Smoleński of the General Staff's Section II to arrest Sławek for treason. Warned by phone, Sławek supposedly took his life just before the arrest.

Baliszewski acknowledges the lack of evidence for this account, which Smoleński himself refuted:

I must categorically state, for the sake of truth, that I did not participate in this action based on Mrs. Perlowa's "assumptions". My role as head of Section II involved gathering intelligence on Nazi Germany's military developments, counterintelligence, and organizing sabotage behind German lines. Internal political matters, including party or personal disputes, fell under the Prime Minister's and Interior Ministry's special agencies. I learned of Sławek's suicide from the press.

Baliszewski also references a March 1939 meeting in the Bank Gospodarstwa Krajowego's basement, where deputies Józef Ostafin and Edwin Norbert Wagner allegedly learned of a coup to install Sławek as president. They informed Mościcki's chaplain, reportedly triggering a search of Sławek's apartment and prompting his suicide. Additionally, Judge Ignacy Wielgus claimed General Marian Kukiel and Stanisław Haller discussed a coup to make Sławek president, Leon Kozłowski prime minister, and Kazimierz Pużak interior minister, with General Kazimierz Sosnkowski urging Sławek to poison Mościcki and align with Germany.

Baliszewski further highlights a peculiar account from Dr. Marek Werner, then a 9-year-old living below Sławek's apartment:

On 2 April 1939, around 9:00 PM, I was packing my schoolbag. My father, Major Symeon Kazimierz Werner, was in the bathroom. No gunshot was heard. Suddenly, my father grabbed his pistol and ran upstairs to Sławek's apartment. The doors were locked, requiring the caretaker, Mr. Marczak, to assist. It took about half an hour for police and an ambulance to arrive. Sławek was alive but died at 6:00 AM in Ujazdów Hospital. No one discussed the event with me. My father, who died in England in 1945, returned hours later, distraught, saying, "These legionaries. They liberated Poland, but now they’re leading it to ruin," without explaining.

Baliszewski admits these hypotheses lack verifiable evidence but notes three independent accounts of a 1939 conspiracy involving Sławek. He cites Bolesław Nawrocki, executor of Maria Mościcka's will, who claimed she confirmed a 1939 assassination attempt on Mościcki, which the president attributed to Sławek.

== Bibliography ==
- Rawicz, Jerzy (1979). Pozostało do wyjaśnienia [Yet to Be Explained] (in Polish). Warsaw: Czytelnik.
