= Andrzej Jaraczewski =

Polish Navy officer (1916–1992)

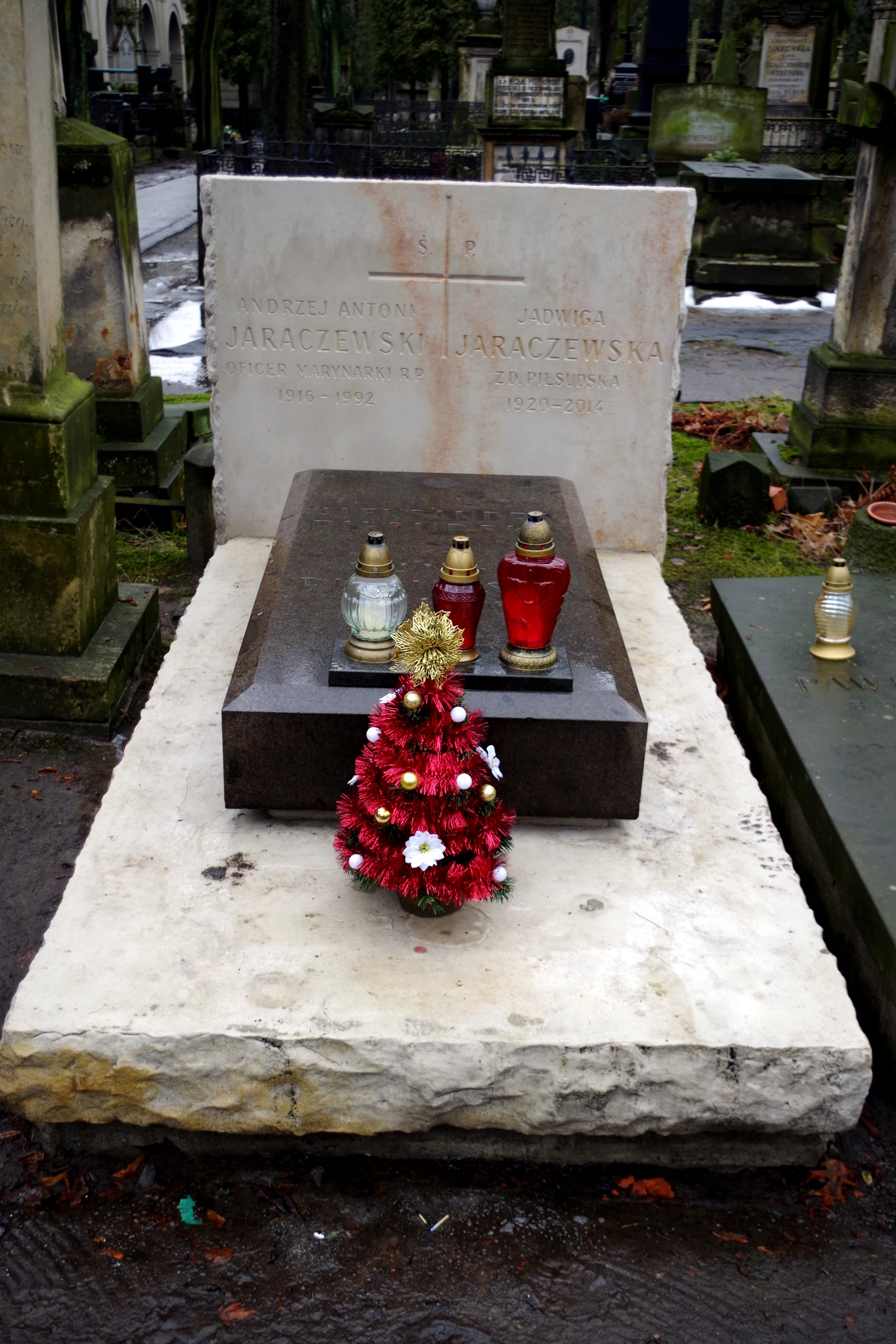
- Born: Andrzej Antoni Jaraczewski; 16 November 1916; German Empire
- Died: 18 October 1992 (aged 75); Poland
- Resting place: Powązki Cemetery, Warsaw, Poland
- Education: Naval Cadet School in Toruń
- Spouse: Jadwiga Piłsudska (m. 1944)
- Children: Krzysztof Józef Jaraczeski; Joanna Maria Onyszkiewicz
- Relatives: Józef Piłsudski (father-in-law); Aleksandra Szczerbińska (mother-in-law); Wanda Piłsudska (sister-in-law)
- Military career
- Allegiance: Poland
- Branch: Polish Navy
- Service years: 1935-1946
- Rank: Lieutenant (kapitan marynarki)
- Nickname: Andrew
- Units: 3. MGB Flotilla; 8. MTB Flotilla
- Commands: MGB S-1 Chart; MGB S-3 Wyżeł; MTB S-7
- Awards: Cross of Valour Naval Medal (three times)

Andrzej Antoni Jaraczewski, nickname Andrew (8 November 1916 – 18 October 1992), was a Polish Navy officer (porucznik marynarki - lieutenant).

He was born into the Polish noble family, Jaraczewski, holding the Zaremba coat of arms. After graduating from the Naval Cadet School in Toruń (now Naval Academy in Gdynia) he was made Sub-Lieutenant (podporucznik marynarki) on 1 October 1938. After the Second World War broke out, he participated in evacuating Polish submarines to the United Kingdom, where he was commanding officer of submarine chasers within 3. MGB Flotilla and torpedo boat within 8. MTB Flotilla. Lt Jaraczewski, alongside Lt Cdr N. B. Weir, accepted the surrender of U-249, the first German submarine surrendered after the capitulation of Nazi Germany.

In 1944 he married Fg Off Jadwiga Piłsudska, an Air Transport Auxiliary pilot and daughter of Marshal Józef Piłsudski. They had two children; a son, Christopher Joseph (in Polish Krzysztof Józef) and daughter, Jane Mary (in Polish Joanna Maria), who later married Polish politician Janusz Onyszkiewicz. In 1977, he and his wife took part in the Silver Jubilee of Elizabeth II on board the MGB S-3 during the Thames River Pageant.

He was awarded the Polish Cross of Valour and Polish Naval Medal (three times).

Jaraczewski is buried in the Powązki Cemetery in Warsaw, Poland.
