= ORP S-3 =

Polish motor gunboat of World War II, leased from the UK

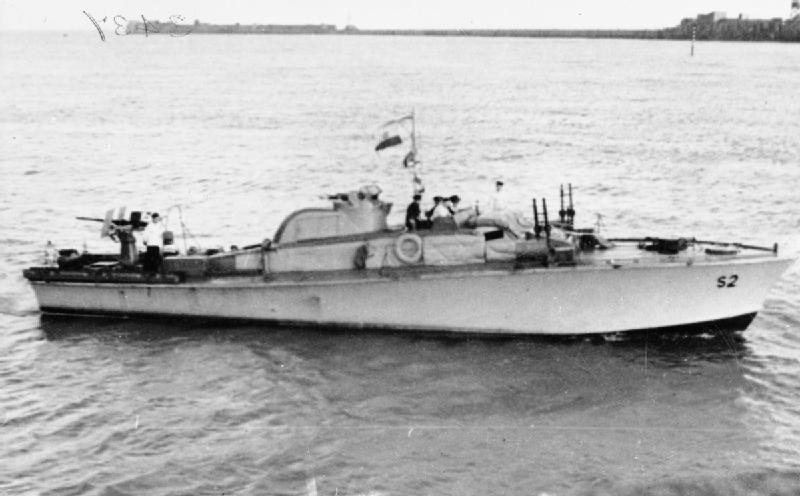
- Twin S.2 after rearming

History

Poland
- Name: ORP S-3
- Builder: British Power Boat Company, Hythe
- Commissioned: July 28, 1940
- Decommissioned: May 17, 1943

United Kingdom
- Name: Freeelance
- Commissioned: 1945
- Fate: converted into a motor yacht

General characteristics
- Class & type: BPB 63'-class motor gunboat
- Displacement: standard: 24 t (24 long tons); full: 31 t (31 long tons)
- Length: 19.2 m (63 ft 0 in)
- Beam: 5 m (16 ft 5 in)
- Draft: 1.3 m (4 ft 3 in)
- Propulsion: 2 Rolls-Royce Merlin engines, each with 1,100 hp (820 kW)
- Speed: 40 knots (74 km/h; 46 mph)
- Crew: 11
- Armament: 1 × 20 mm Oerlikon cannon; 4 depth charges; 4 × 7.7 mm Lewis guns

ORP S-3 (British designations: MA/SB 45, MGB 45) was a Polish motor gunboat of World War II, one of two British Power Boat 63' type boats leased from the United Kingdom by the Polish Navy in 1940. Unofficially referred to as "Wyżeł" in some post-war literature, this name was likely not used. It conducted numerous patrols and engaged in several skirmishes with German light naval forces in the English Channel from August 1940 until its decommissioning in May 1943. After the war, it was converted into a motor yacht.

== History ==
In early 1939, Poland ordered two motor torpedo boats from the British shipyard J. Samuel White in Cowes. These were not completed before the outbreak of World War II, and the order was taken over by the Royal Navy. Following the Polish-British naval agreement of 18 November 1939, the Naval Command decided to complete the boats for the Polish Navy reconstituted in the UK. By summer 1940, it was agreed that Poland would receive only one of the original boats, ORP S-1, while the British Admiralty offered two smaller sister boats, later designated ORP S-2 and S-3, in exchange. Some sources suggest the second Cowes boat (MA/SB 47) was damaged by air attack, prompting the substitution.

The leased boats, originally ordered by the Swedish Navy as T 1 and T 2, were built at the British Power Boat Company in Hythe and taken over by the Royal Navy as MA/SB 44 and 45 after the war began. Designed by racing boat designer Hubert Scott-Paine, they belonged to the third series of the BPB 63' (63-foot) type, alongside four boats built for Norway. Initially intended as motor torpedo boats, the Royal Navy repurposed them for anti-submarine warfare as motor anti-submarine boats (MA/SB), equipped with light artillery and depth charges but lacking planned sonar systems. In January 1941, they were reclassified as motor gunboats (MGB).

Temporarily designated No. III, the boat was assigned the Polish designation S-3, (Note: According to Borowiak (2015, p. 108), the method of numbering for alphanumeric designations "S" was changed at the end of 1940. In correspondence, the names of the pursuit boats were usually written with a period, in the form: S.1, S.2, S.3 (Borowiak (2015, pp. 117, 178)).) alongside its British designations MA/SB 45 and, from January 1941, MGB 45. A Naval Command directive on 8 January 1941 omitted the prefix ORP for these boats, contrary to pre-war regulations. The name "Wyżeł", proposed by group commander Lieutenant Tadeusz Dąbrowski in December 1940, was not approved. Some sources mention an MGB 205 designation, but this lacks confirmation. On 11 July 1940, Sub-Lieutenant Andrzej Jaraczewski was appointed commander, and S-3 was commissioned on 28 July. Unlike S-1 and S-2, S-3 remained leased, not purchased, by the Polish Navy.

== Design ==
The length overall of S-3 was 19.2 metres (63 ft 0 in), with a beam of 5 metres (16 ft 5 in) and an average draft of 1.3 metres (4 ft 3 in). Its standard displacement was 24 long tons (24 t), and full displacement was approximately 31 long tons (31 t). Propulsion consisted of two Rolls-Royce Merlin aviation gasoline engines, each producing 1,100 horsepower (820 kW) (2,200 hp, 1,600 kW total). The maximum speed during trials was 40 knots (74 km/h; 46 mph), though it typically did not exceed 35 knots (65 km/h; 40 mph) in service. The standard crew comprised 11 personnel: two officers and nine non-commissioned officers and sailors.

Initially, the boat's armament included a single 20 mm Oerlikon autocannon on the stern deck and four 7.7 mm Lewis machine guns, mounted in pairs in turrets on the midship section on either side of the superstructure. It was designed to carry up to ten depth charges (potentially replacing the autocannon), but this was reduced to four at commissioning and two by August 1940.

During a refit in autumn 1941, the armament was modified. The Oerlikon autocannon remained, but the Lewis gun turrets were removed. A twin 12.7 mm Vickers heavy machine gun was installed in a Frazer-Nash turret on the superstructure's centreline, and two twin 7.7 mm Lewis machine guns were mounted on column bases along the sides near the command station. Reinforced stern decking enabled the boat to carry up to 18 small 30 kg (66 lb) naval mines of the R type, which were floating mines connected by 33-metre (108 ft) ropes, forming a barrier that sank after about an hour.

== Service ==
S-3, alongside its sister boat S-2, joined the 3rd MA/SB Flotilla (reclassified as MGB Flotilla in 1941) on 28 July 1940, based in Dartmouth and later Fowey. Operating in the English Channel, their primary roles included protecting coastal convoys and conducting offensive patrols toward occupied French shores. In 1940, amid fears of German invasion, S-2 and S-3 were heavily used for reconnaissance patrols. Beginning operations on 14 August, S-3 completed seven patrols that month. The Polish crew's meticulous engine maintenance resulted in S-3 logging 150 hours underway by September, the highest in the flotilla since its formation.

Over nearly three years, S-3 engaged in coastal operations, encountering the enemy several times but suffering frequent mechanical and combat-related damage. On the night of 3–4 September 1940, it ran aground on North Goodwin Sands east of Dover alongside S-2, damaging a propeller shaft and propeller during low tide. (Note: Sources differ on whether S-3 was towed by S-2 or returned on one engine (Borowiak (2015, pp. 176–177)).) This prevented its participation in the bombardment of Cherbourg on 23 September. On 25 November 1940 (or possibly 25 October), a magnetic mine detonated near S-3 at Fowey's entrance, fracturing the keel and injuring three crew members. (Note: Borowiak (2015, p. 181) cites 25 November, but Twardowski (2014, pp. 7, 12) and others suggest 25 October.) Its high speed, maintained after evading German aircraft fire, likely prevented sinking. Repairs lasted until June 1941. On 17 June 1941, S-3 struck rocks near Falmouth at 35 knots in fog, damaging the bow. Repairs and rearming extended from 20 June to December 1941. During the refit, the vessel was rearmed with heavy machine guns and mines.

On 16 January 1942, with MGB 8, it attacked a German patrol boat off Boulogne's roadstead, providing covering fire while MGB 8 deployed a depth charge, but suffered bow leaks from nearby explosions. It was repaired from 1 February to 17 April 1942. On the night of 8–9 June 1942, S-3 and two other boats engaged German armed trawlers near Dunkirk. On 21 June, an engine failure forced it to abandon a patrol with S-2, missing a skirmish against six German torpedo boats. On 20–21 July, S-3 and S-2 were fired upon by Dunkirk's shore batteries without losses.

On 7 August 1942, S-3, S-2, MGB 41, and three torpedo boats attacked a German convoy, with S-3 covering the damaged S-2 during a fight against four German torpedo boats, possibly damaging one. On 22 September, S-3 and two British boats were attacked by three Messerschmitt Bf 109 fighters, possibly downing or damaging one, with no losses on S-3. On 5–6 October 1942, S-3, S-2, and three boats laid mines on a convoy route from Boulogne to Dunkirk, likely damaging convoy units, as eight explosions were heard. A similar operation on 11–12 October (or possibly 11–12 June) resulted in one explosion, with shore fire targeting the boats. (Note: Borowiak (2015, pp. 155, 196–197) lists these events under both 11–12 June and 11–12 October; Twardowski (2014, p. 8) mentions 14 June.)

Due to wear, S-3 was decommissioned from Polish service on 16 May 1943 and returned to the Royal Navy on 20 May in Dover. It spent 251 days at sea, participating in 97 patrols and operations, including five engagements. The Polish crew later manned the leased MGB 113, designated S-4.

Post-war, S-3 was sold privately in 1945 and converted into the motor yacht Freelance, still extant in 2014. In 1977, it participated in a parade for Queen Elizabeth II's Silver Jubilee, with former commander Andrzej Jaraczewski aboard. Its engines were replaced with more economical units during its civilian use.

== Commanders ==
Rank, name	Start	End
Sub-Lieutenant Andrzej Jaraczewski (promoted to Lieutenant on 3 May 1941)	11 July 1940	25 September 1941
Sub-Lieutenant Maciej Bocheński	26 September 1941	March 1943
Sub-Lieutenant Roman Dulla (acting)	12 January 1943	16 April 1943
Sub-Lieutenant Ludwik Antoszewicz	16 April 1943	16 May 1943

The crew included Sub-Lieutenant Tadeusz Lesisz as watch officer (11 July – 9 December 1940).

== Bibliography ==
- Borowiak, Mariusz (2015). Ścigacze Polskiej Marynarki Wojennej w II wojnie światowej [Motor Gunboats of the Polish Navy in World War II] (in Polish). Warsaw: Alma-Press. ISBN 978-83-7020-611-6.
- Twardowski, Marek (2014). "Polskie ścigacze w II wojnie światowej" [Polish Motor Gunboats in World War II]. Morze, Statki i Okręty (in Polish). 19 (144). Magnum-X. ISSN 1426-529X.
