= ORP S-2 =

Polish motor gunboat from World War II

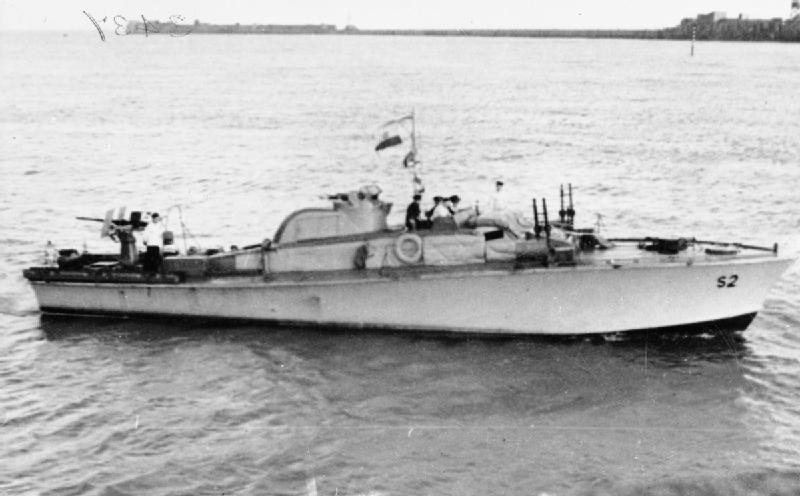
- ORP S-2 after rearmament, 1942–1944

History

Poland
- Name: ORP S-2 (MA/SB 44, MGB 44)
- Builder: British Power Boat Company, Hythe
- Commissioned: July 19, 1940
- Decommissioned: July 5, 1944

General characteristics
- Class & type: motor gunboat
- Type: BPB 63′
- Displacement: standard: 24 t (24 long tons); full: about 31 t (31 long tons)
- Length: 19.2 m (63 ft 0 in)
- Beam: 5 m (16 ft 5 in)
- Draft: 1.3 m (4 ft 3 in)
- Propulsion: 2 Rolls-Royce Merlin engines, 1,100 hp each
- Speed: 40 kn (74 km/h; 46 mph) (trials); 35 kn (65 km/h; 40 mph) (operational)
- Complement: 11
- Armament: 1 × Oerlikon 20 mm cannon; 2 × 12.7 mm heavy machine guns; 4 × 7.7 mm Lewis machine guns; 18 × 30 kg naval mines

ORP S-2 (British designations: MA/SB 44, MGB 44) was a Polish motor gunboat from World War II, one of two British Power Boat 63'-type vessels acquired by the Polish Navy in 1940. It is also known in some literature by the unofficial name Wilczur. The Polish flag was raised on the vessel on 19 July 1940, with Sub-Lieutenant Eugeniusz Wciślicki as its first commander. ORP S-2 participated in numerous skirmishes with German light naval forces in the English Channel region. It was decommissioned on 5 July 1944 due to wear and was likely scrapped after March 1947.

== History ==
The sister gunboats ORP S-2 and ORP S-3 were offered to the Polish Navy Command in exchange for the second of two torpedo boats ordered before the war from the J. Samuel White shipyard in Cowes, of which only the first, ORP S-1, was delivered. Originally built for the Swedish Navy under the designations T 1 and T 2 at the British Power Boat yard in Hythe, these vessels bore the British designations MA/SB 44 and 45 (Motor Anti-Submarine Boat) and were requisitioned by the Royal Navy after the outbreak of war. Designed by racing boat innovator Hubert Scott-Paine, they belonged to the third series of the BPB 63' (63-foot) type, alongside four additional boats intended for Norway. Initially planned as torpedo boats, the British repurposed them for anti-submarine duties with light artillery and depth charges, though they lacked intended sonar equipment and were ultimately reclassified as gunboats.

ORP S-2 was handed over to the Polish Navy on 28 June 1940 and formally transferred under an agreement dated 10 July 1941. It entered service on 19 July 1940, with Sub-Lieutenant Eugeniusz Wciślicki appointed captain on 11 July. From January 1941, following a British reclassification, it also carried the designation MGB 44 (Motor Gun Boat). Some sources mention the Polish name Wilczur (Wolfhound), though this was unofficial and its widespread use is uncertain. (Note: According to Borowiak (2015, p. 143), the crew "infrequently" used the unofficial name ORP Wilczur. Borowiak (2015, p. 128) also notes that Lieutenant Tadeusz Dąbrowski, commander of the gunboat group, proposed renaming ORP S-1, S-2, and S-3 to Ogar, Wilczur, and Wyżeł, but the Polish Navy Command rejected this in January 1941. However, Captain Jaraczewski, commander of ORP S-1 and S-3, claimed crews neither used nor likely knew these names (Twardowski (1998, p. 41)).) References to an MGB 204 designation appear in some accounts, but lack substantiation.

== Design ==
ORP S-2 was a gunboat measuring 19.2 meters in length, with a maximum beam of 5 meters and an average draft of 1.3 meters. Its standard displacement was 24 long tons, increasing to approximately 31 long tons fully loaded. Propulsion came from two Rolls-Royce Merlin aviation gasoline engines, each producing 1,100 horsepower. It achieved a maximum speed of 40 knots during trials, though operational speed did not exceed 35 knots. The standard crew comprised two officers and nine non-commissioned officers and sailors.

Initially, its armament included a single Oerlikon 20 mm cannon on the aft deck and four 7.7 mm Lewis guns, mounted in pairs in turrets amidships on either side of the superstructure. It could carry up to ten depth charges (possibly replacing the cannon), though this was reduced to four upon commissioning and further to two by August 1940.

Between October 1941 and January 1942, ORP S-2 was rearmed. The Oerlikon cannon remained aft, but the Lewis gun turrets were removed. A twin 12.7 mm Vickers machine gun was installed in a Frazer-Nash turret on the superstructure's centerline, supplemented by two twin 7.7 mm Lewis guns on column mounts near the command position. Reinforced aft decking allowed it to carry up to 18 small 30 kg mines of the R type − floating mines linked by 33-meter ropes to form a barrier, sinking after about an hour.

== Service ==
ORP S-2 joined the multinational 3rd MA/SB Flotilla (later MGB) on 19 July 1940, based in Dartmouth, then Fowey and Ramsgate. It was soon joined by ORP S-3 and later ORP S-1, forming the III Division of the flotilla, commanded by Sub-Lieutenant Wciślicki, nicknamed "Captain Whisky" by the British. Their primary duties included escorting coastal convoys in the English Channel, offensive raids toward occupied Belgium and France, and patrolling the British coast. Administratively, the Polish gunboats reported to the Polish Naval Command "Południe" in Plymouth, while tactically they were under British command.

The crew's first combat success was downing a German Heinkel He 111 bomber on 27 August 1940 near Portsmouth. On the night of 3–4 September, ORP S-2 and S-3, escorting a coastal convoy, ran aground on North Goodwin Sands; ORP S-3 sustained damage and was towed to Ramsgate by ORP S-2. On 23 September, ORP S-2 helped escort the battleship HMS Revenge during the bombardment of Cherbourg. In early March 1941, one engine was replaced, and on 21–22 March, the vessel engaged in a brief firefight between British and German gunboats. From 10 June to 26 September 1941, Sub-Lieutenant Maciej Bocheński temporarily replaced Wciślicki, during which both engines were swapped, followed by a refit and rearmament from September 1941 to March 1942. In March, April, and June 1942, ORP S-2 conducted patrols, including mine-laying operations.

Its most notable action occurred on 21–22 June 1942, engaging six German Schnellboote in the English Channel. ORP S-2 and S-3 patrolled near the French coast, but S-3 returned due to engine failure. At 38 minutes past midnight, ORP S-2 was alerted to six enemy vessels − S 67, S 70, S 104 (2nd Flotilla) and S 48, S 63, S 64, S 109 (4th Flotilla), possibly reduced to five − preparing to attack a British convoy. Positioning itself between the enemy and the shore by 1:05 AM, ORP S-2 opened fire, disrupting the German formation and forcing their withdrawal. Polish reports suggest the Schnellboote fired on each other in the confusion. After a brief clash, with ammunition depleted, ORP S-2 sustained minor damage − a hole in the hull and a pierced antenna − before retreating and meeting four British gunboats sent as reinforcements. Wciślicki was later accused of disobeying a 11:10 PM recall order due to a radiotelegraphist's error. (Note: Borowiak (2015, p. 158) argues the radiotelegraphist's mention in the report supports a genuine misunderstanding rather than deliberate disobedience.) Admiral Bertram Ramsay, Dover area commander, dismissed the charges, likening the action to Horatio Nelson's traditions. The engagement, with no confirmed losses, was deemed a tactical victory against superior odds, earning Wciślicki the Silver Cross of Virtuti Militari and Distinguished Service Cross, with other crew members also decorated. German records suggest one to three Schnellboote sustained minor damage, possibly from friendly fire, though this is unconfirmed. (Note: Borowiak (2015, p. 161) claims one Schnellboot was severely damaged, citing archives, but provides no specifics.)

On 5–6 July 1942, ORP S-2, leading five gunboats, clashed briefly with Schnellboote defending a convoy. On 7 August, with ORP S-3, it supported a British torpedo boat attack on a German convoy near Calais. Reports credited the Polish vessels with sinking one and damaging another enemy gunboat, though German archives suggest these claims were exaggerated. On 22 September, ORP S-2 and two British units were strafed by Luftwaffe fighters. It remained active, including transporting saboteurs to France with ORP S-1 in December 1943. Decommissioned on 5 July 1944 due to wear, it was laid up at Devonport. Inspected by a Polish Naval Mission in March 1947, its poor condition led to its likely scrapping thereafter.

Captains of ORP S-2 were:

- 19 July 1940 – 5 October 1942: Lt. Eugeniusz Wciślicki
  - 10 June 1941 – 26 September 1941: Sub-Lt. Maciej Bocheński (acting)
- 5 October 1942 – 5 December 1942: Sub-Lt. Józef Ponikiewski (acting)
- 5 December 1942 – 14 December 1942: Sub-Lt. Ludwik Antoszewicz (acting)
- 15 December 1942 – 2 May 1944: Lt. Witold Szuster
- 3 May 1944 – 5 July 1944: Sub-Lt. Jerzy Krasucki (acting)

== Bibliography ==
- Borowiak, Mariusz (2015). Ścigacze Polskiej Marynarki Wojennej w II wojnie światowej [Gunboats of the Polish Navy in World War II] (in Polish). Warszawa: Alma-Press. ISBN 978-83-7020-611-6.
- Twardowski, Marek (1998). "Polskie ścigacze w II wojnie światowej" [Polish Gunboats in World War II]. Morza, Statki i Okręty (in Polish). 3. Warsaw: Magnum-X. ISSN 1426-529X.
