= Kasztanka =

Mare of marshal Joʻzef piłsudski

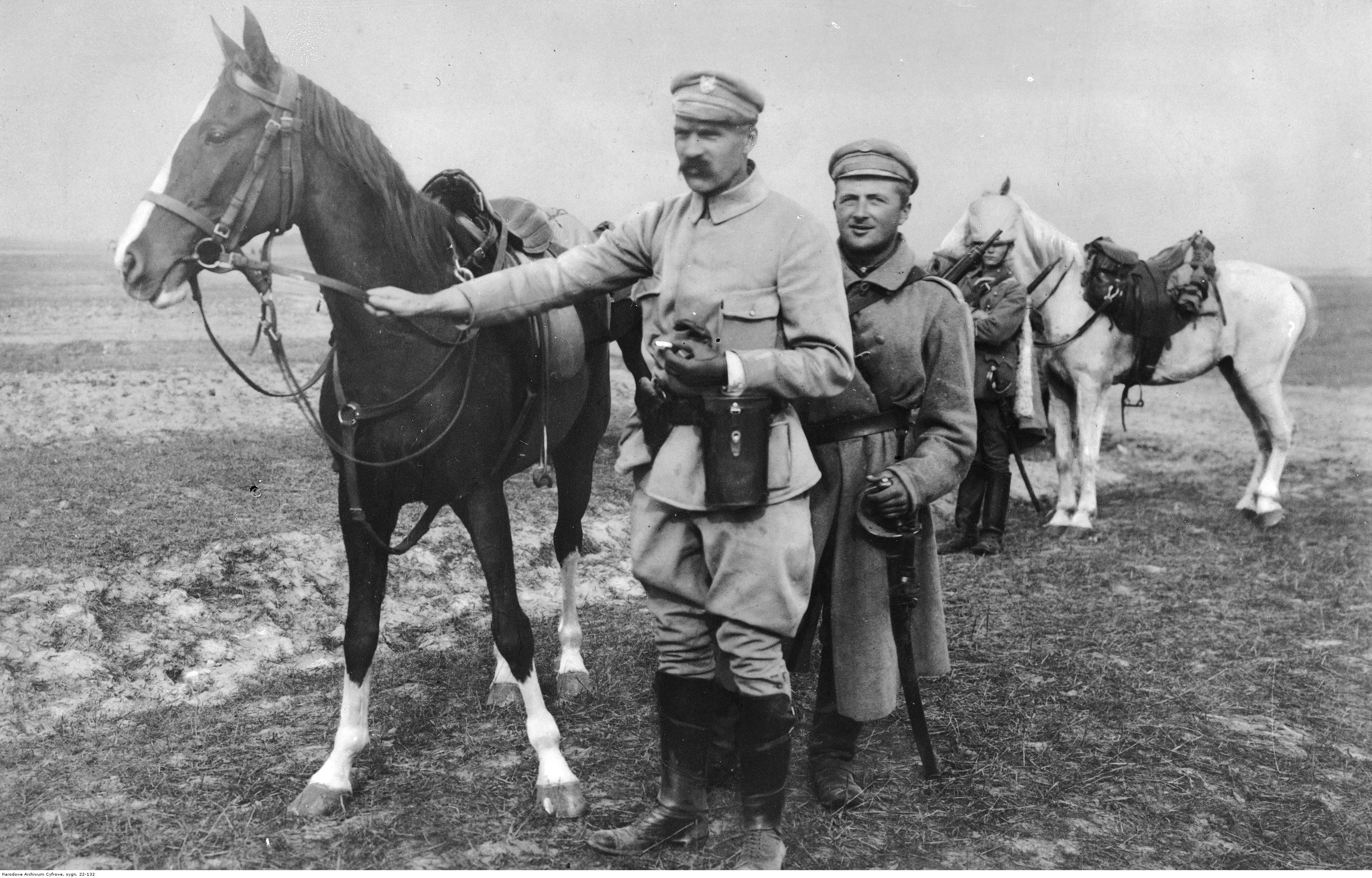
Józef Piłsudski with Kasztanka

Kasztanka ([kaʂˈtaŋka]; Polish for "chestnut mare"; born 1909 or 1910, died November 23, 1927) was the famous mare that belonged to interwar Poland's leader, Marshal Józef Piłsudski.

== Life ==
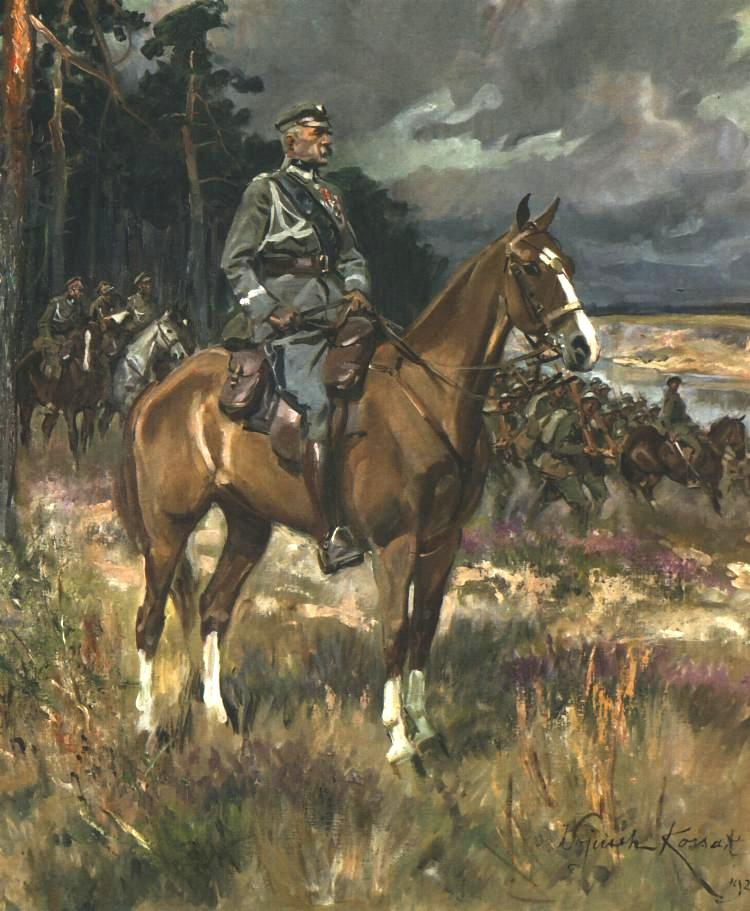
Piłsudski on Horseback, astride Kasztanka, by Wojciech Kossak

Kasztanka is the Polish word for the chestnut color in mares, and Piłsudski so named his horse due to her color.

She was foaled at Ludwik Popiel's Czaple Małe (Little Herons) estate probably in 1909 or 1910, and reared at his Czaple Wielkie (Great Herons) estate, in Miechów County, Kraków Province. Offered by her owner to the riflemen of the First Brigade of the Polish Legions, she became the service mount of Commandant Józef Piłsudski, who entered Kielce on her in August 1914 and kept her as a riding horse until her untimely death 13 years later.

She was an elegant mare of moderate height, about 14.3 hands (59 inches, 150 cm) at the withers, chestnut (light reddish-brown) in color, with markings that included a blaze and four white stockings.

Kasztanka was Józef Piłsudski's favorite horse and faithful companion in the Polish Legions' battles at the side of Austro-Hungary and Germany in World War I, for the independence of Poland. Indeed, she acknowledged only Piłsudski. Her task was to carry the Commandant during the First Brigade's marches. She was not remarkable for any unique gait nor for extraordinary feats of courage, but she was very loyal. Kasztanka was somewhat high-strung and hated artillery fire, but when her master asked, she remained controlled and obedient under difficult conditions, reciprocating his devotion.

The Polish Legions' First Uhlan Regiment, commanded by Colonel Władysław Belina-Prażmowski, presented Piłsudski with new trappings for Kasztanka, and it was in these that she henceforth appeared.

In 1922 Kasztanka went to Mińsk Mazowiecki into the care of the 7th Lublin Uhlan Regiment. From there she would be sent to Warsaw when Marshal Piłsudski, as Commander-in-Chief, was to take part in state ceremonies and, seated astride Kasztanka, review military parades. When he was at his country house in Sulejówek, the mare was sometimes brought there to visit, especially to the Marshal's daughters, Wanda and Jadwiga.

Kasztanka gave birth to two foals over the course of her life, a colt and a filly. Other than that in both cases she gave birth when she was stabled at the 7th Uhlan Regiment in Mińsk Mazowiecki, little information has been preserved concerning their sires, except that they were government-owned stallions. The colt, a gray named Niemen after the river, inherited only his dam's good looks but not her personality; he was lazy. He was proposed to succeed Kasztanka in serving Marshal Piłsudski, but never did. Kasztanka's filly, which Piłsudski christened Mera in memory of the river that flowed through Zułów, the family estate where he had been born, was foaled April 10, 1925, and was a chestnut like Kasztanka. In 1930, according to her surviving records, Mera was in the care of the First Light Cavalry Regiment as "officer's service horse of First Marshal Józef Piłsudski."

Marshal Piłsudski rode Kasztanka for the last time on November 11, 1927, at the Polish Independence Day parade on Warsaw's Saxon Square (now Piłsudski Square).

== Death ==
Ten days after Kasztanka's final parade, on November 21, 1927, she was sent by rail back to the 7th Uhlan Regiment at Mińsk Mazowiecki, where she was stabled. However, she became ill or injured en route and died two days later. The final report on her, in an addendum to the Regimental order of the day dated November 25, 1927, read:

"On November 3, 1927, the mare Kasztanka, property of Marshal Piłsudski, was sent to Warsaw for a parade celebrating the ninth anniversary of Poland's Independence on November 11. She was sent on the instructions of the military cabinet of the Minister of Military Affairs. Kasztanka was a saddle mare that had been ridden by Marshal Piłsudski since 1914. Kasztanka took part on November 11 in the parade, being mounted for the last time by Marshal Piłsudski. On November 21, 1927, she was sent by rail transport to Mińsk Mazowiecki, and became ill en route. Upon arrival at the railroad station, despite assistance rendered by the 7th Uhlan Regiment's doctor of veterinary medicine, Lt. W. Koppe, she was unable to rise. She was transported to barracks. In view of the worsening state of her health, veterinary assistance was summoned from Warsaw, and on the night of November 21–22 Lt. Col. Konrad Millak and Lt. Col. Władysław Kulczycki arrived. These doctors of veterinary medicine took further energetic measures. They did not succeed in improving the state of [Kasztanka's] health, and at 10 o'clock that day they issued the following assessment: 'Grave internal trauma... severe distress to blood vessels and heart.' Kasztanka died on November 23, 1927, at five o'clock in the morning."

The order of the day was signed by the 7th Uhlan Regiment's commander at the time, Lt. Col. Zygmunt Piasecki, who later complained that after Kasztanka's death Marshal Piłsudski would not talk to him.

Reportedly on the train, Kasztanka had attempted to get to the other side of a partition and had struck her backbone against a pole with all her force, and this was the cause of her injury and death.

== Legacy ==
After her death, Kasztanka's body underwent taxidermy; in this form, after Marshal Piłsudski's death in 1935, she was given a place in the Belweder Palace museum. The rest of her remains were buried in a park at the barracks of the 7th Uhlan Regiment, beneath a stone inscribed, "Here lies KASZTANKA, favorite combat mare of Marshal Piłsudski."

During World War II, under German occupation, the stuffed Kasztanka ended up in Warsaw's Museum of the Polish Armed Forces. The mount survived the war, but due to lack of routine care for the collections, was badly damaged by moths. After the war she was probably cremated. By some accounts, this was done at the behest of Marshal Michał Rola-Żymierski, who had opposed Marshal Piłsudski's May 1926 Coup d'État and been court-martialled and demoted from general to private, but during World War II had been restored by the Soviet Union's Marshal Joseph Stalin to the rank of general and on May 3, 1945, promoted to Marshal.

== In art ==
Kasztanka earned a place not only in the hearts of Marshal Piłsudski and his family, but in those of their countrymen. She became an equine celebrity. The first songs of Polish soldiers during World War I, written by K. Biernacki and B. Lubicz, featured Kasztanka.

She was also a subject of Wojciech Kossak's 1928 painting Piłsudski on Horseback, which hangs in the National Museum, Warsaw. This painting remains one of the most popular artistic portrayals of Piłsudski.

Kasztanka figured as well in satirical artwork and songs produced by Piłsudski's political opponents.

== See also ==
- List of historical horses
