= Aleksandra Piłsudska =

Polish independence fighter, PPS activist, First Lady of Poland

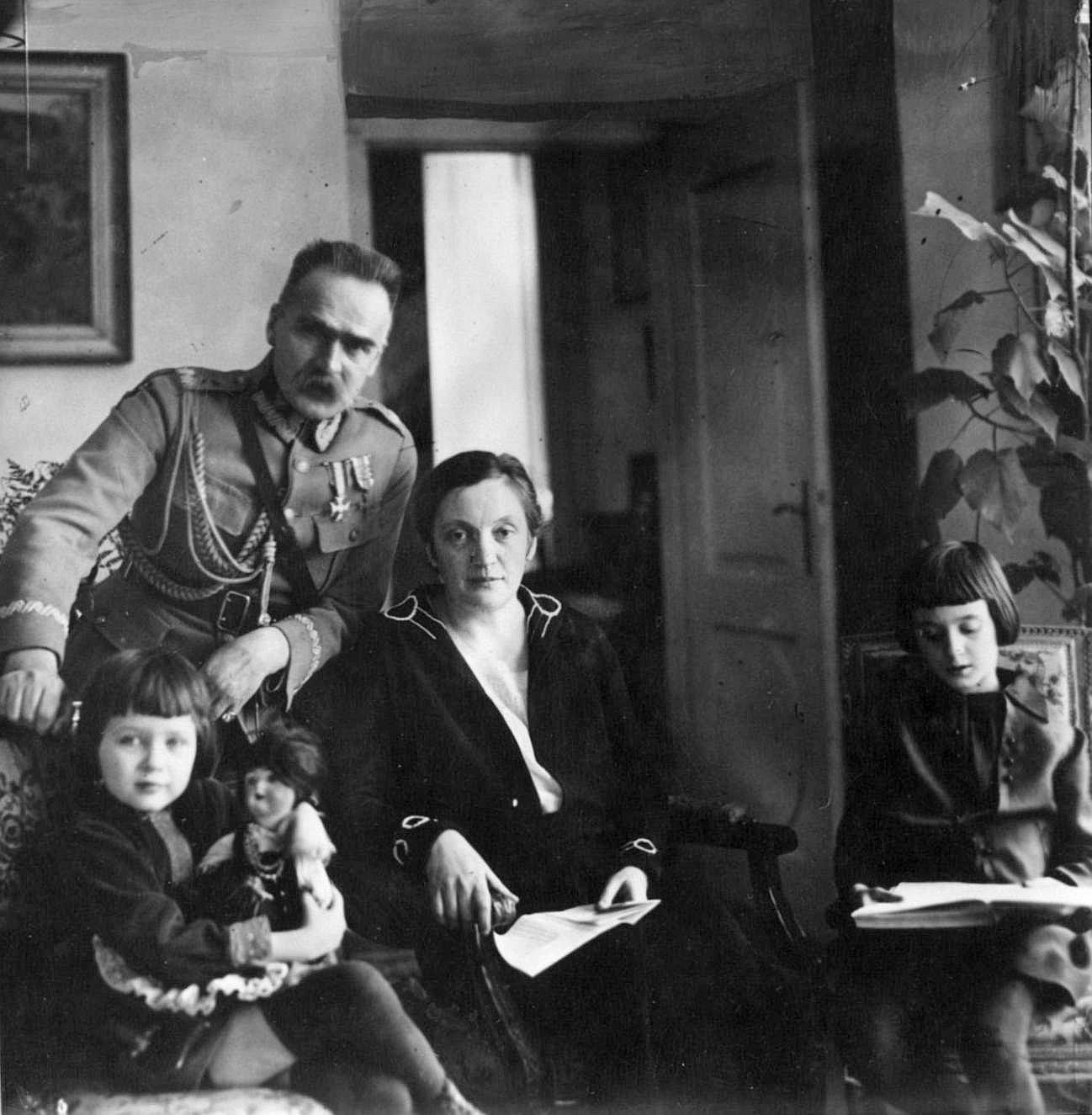

First Lady of Poland
- In role 25 September 1921 – 11 December 1922
- President: Józef Piłsudski (Chief of State)
- Preceded by: Maria Piłsudska
- Succeeded by: Vacant (Next was Maria Wojciechowska)

Personal details
- Born: Aleksandra Szczerbińska; 12 December 1882 Suwałki, Suwałki Governorate, Russian Empire
- Died: 31 March 1963 (aged 80) London, England
- Spouse: Józef Piłsudski (m. 1921; died 1935)
- Children: Wanda Piłsudska; Jadwiga Piłsudska-Jaraczewska

Aleksandra Piłsudska (née Szczerbińska; 12 December 1882 – 31 March 1963) was a Polish socialist and independence activist, member of Polish Socialist Party and Polish Military Organisation, the second wife of Józef Piłsudski.

== Life and career ==
Aleksandra was born in Suwałki, in the Suwałki Governorate, Russian Empire (now in Poland), and was the seventh child of Piotr Paweł and Julia Jadwiga (née Zahorska). Her father was a townsman, and her mother came from the nobility, but both their families were relatively poor. Aleksandra's parents died when she was ten years old, and the orphan was raised by her grandmother, Karolina Zahorska (née Truskolaska), and her aunt, Wiktoria Maria Zahorska.

She attended gymnasium, the equivalent of high school, in Suwałki, graduating in 1901, and soon began her studies at the Flying University. In 1903, she began working in the office of the Homa leather factory, located in the Wola district of Warsaw.

In 1904, she joined the Polish Socialist Party (PPS), one of the two main revolutionary and political movements in partitioned Poland, the other being National Democracy. She was soon acting as a PPS agitator in the Warsaw suburb of Praga, taking part in a demonstration held on Plac Grzybowski on 13 November 1904. She also joined the military arm of the PPS, Organizacja Bojowa, where she became a courier and stockpiler of weapons. It became necessary for her to resign from her job at the factory, and she tutored students to supplement her income.

In May 1906, she met Józef Piłsudski. That year, the PPS split into two factions, supporters and opponents of Piłsudski. She remained with the Piłsudski faction. Aleksandra was arrested in 1907 and imprisoned for three weeks in Daniłłowicze prison, then transferred to the Pawiak prison, where she was eventually released due to insufficient evidence. She moved to Radzymin and later to Kiev, and at that time fell in love with Piłsudski. (He was then unhappily married to Maria Juszkiewiczowa z Koplewskich).

In 1908, she took part in the Bezdany raid, where Piłsudski and several fellow revolutionaries robbed a Russian mail train. She was crucial in helping to organize the raid, acting as a lookout, and preparing maps and plans for weeks before the robbery. Afterwards, she moved to Lwów, and once again became an office worker in a factory. Soon, she became involved with the new organization formed by Piłsudski, The Union of Riflemen, Związek Strzelecki, and from 1912, she was an important activist in the women's section of the ZS. She was a librarian in yet another one of Piłsudski's organizations, the Union of Active Fighters, Związek Walki Czynnej, and a cofounder of the Society for the Welfare of Political Prisoners (Towarzystwo Opieki nad Więzniami Politycznymi).

During the First World War, she worked in the intelligence and communication section of the First Brigade of the Polish Legions, and soon she became involved with the Polish Military Organisation (Polska Organizacja Wojskowa). As a result of these activities, she was arrested in 1915 by the Germans in Warsaw, and again imprisoned in Pawiak in November of that year. Found guilty, she was imprisoned in Szczypiorno and Lauban in Silesia. She was released after the Act of 5 November 1916, which proclaimed the creation of the Kingdom of Poland, a puppet state, allied and expected to work with, and controlled by, the Central Powers. She then returned to Warsaw, and resumed her work in the organization called the Women's League (Liga Kobiet). She identified as a feminist and wrote:

Piłsudski already promised that if he started to organize the army he would not forget about women's unit. The feminist movement was very popular in Europe in this time. In England suffragists chained themselves to bars on the streets and torched castles while fighting for women's rights. Feminists were also popular in France and other countries. Only socialists claimed that women should have equal rights with men.

In February 1918, Aleksandra had a daughter, Wanda, and in February 1920, a second daughter, Jadwiga. Their father was Józef Piłsudski. Piłsudski and Aleksandra could not get married as Piłsudski's wife Maria refused to divorce him. It was only after Maria's death in 1921 that they were married, on 25 October of the same year.

After Piłsudski's May Coup in 1926, Aleksandra became a patron and a leader of the Women's League. She was also a chairwoman of the Military Family's Association (Rodzina Wojskowa), the "Osiedle" Association, and the Union of Polish Defenders of the Fatherland (Unia Polskich Związków Obrończyń Ojczyzny). She was also active in the affairs of the Association for the Care of Homeless Children (Towarzystwo Opieki nad Bezdomnymi Dziećmi).

Her marriage to Piłsudski became stormy in later years, with Piłsudski living apart from her for long periods of time, in various governmental residences. Josef Piłsudski died in May 1935.

After the German invasion of Poland on 1 September 1939, she fled with her daughters via Lithuania, Latvia and Sweden to the United Kingdom. There, she wrote her memoirs, and lived in London until her death. She is buried at the North Sheen Cemetery. One of her daughters, Jadwiga, a pilot, served with distinction in the Air Transport Auxiliary during the Second World War.

== Bibliography ==
- Garlicki, Andrzej (1981). "Aleksandra ze Szczerbińskich Piłsudska". Polski Słownik Biograficzny (in Polish). Vol. 26. Wrocław. pp. 303–304.
