= Wanda Piłsudska =

Polish psychiatrist

- Born: 7 February 1918; Warsaw, Kingdom of Poland
- Died: 16 January 2001 (aged 82); Warsaw, Poland
- Resting place: Powązki Cemetery
- Occupation: Psychiatrist
- Parents: Józef Piłsudski (father); Aleksandra née Szczerbińska (mother)
- Relatives: Jadwiga Piłsudska
- Awards: Order of Poland Restored (Polonia Restituta) (Officer)

Wanda Piłsudska (7 February 1918 – 16 January 2001) was a psychiatrist.

== Life ==
Wanda Piłsudska, of the Piłsudski family, was the elder daughter of Józef Piłsudski and Aleksandra Szczerbińska. She spent her youth mainly in Warsaw, living with her family at the Belweder Palace, and in Sulejówek at the cottage of Milusin, which Piłsudski had received as a gift from his soldiers.

In September 1939, together with her mother and younger sister Jadwiga Piłsudska, Wanda was evacuated by special aeroplane via Sweden to the United Kingdom. She studied medicine in Edinburgh, then practiced psychiatry at a Polish hospital outside London. She also worked with the Józef Piłsudski Institute in London.

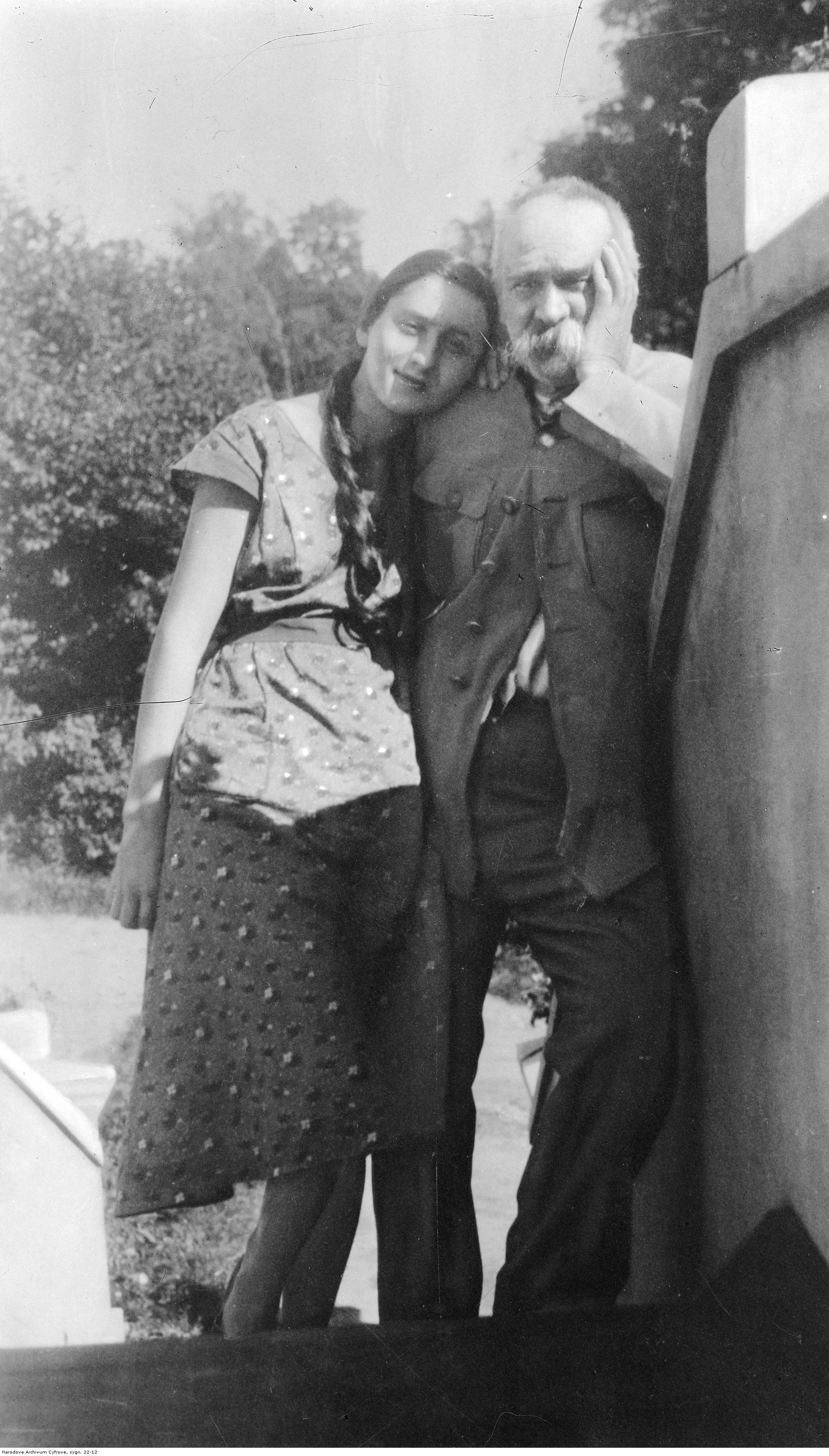
Piłsudska with her father (1931–1934)

In the autumn of 1990, Wanda returned for good to Poland. In November 2000 she regained the family cottage in Sulejówek, where she planned to create a museum dedicated to her father.

Wanda Piłsudska died on 16 January 2001 in Warsaw after a protracted illness. She willed her entire estate for the establishment of a museum honouring Józef Piłsudski.

== See also ==
- Józef Piłsudski
- Bronisław Piłsudski (1866–1918)
- Jadwiga Piłsudska
- Piłsudski (family)
- Kasztanka
