= Jadwiga Piłsudska =

Polish pilot (1920–2014)

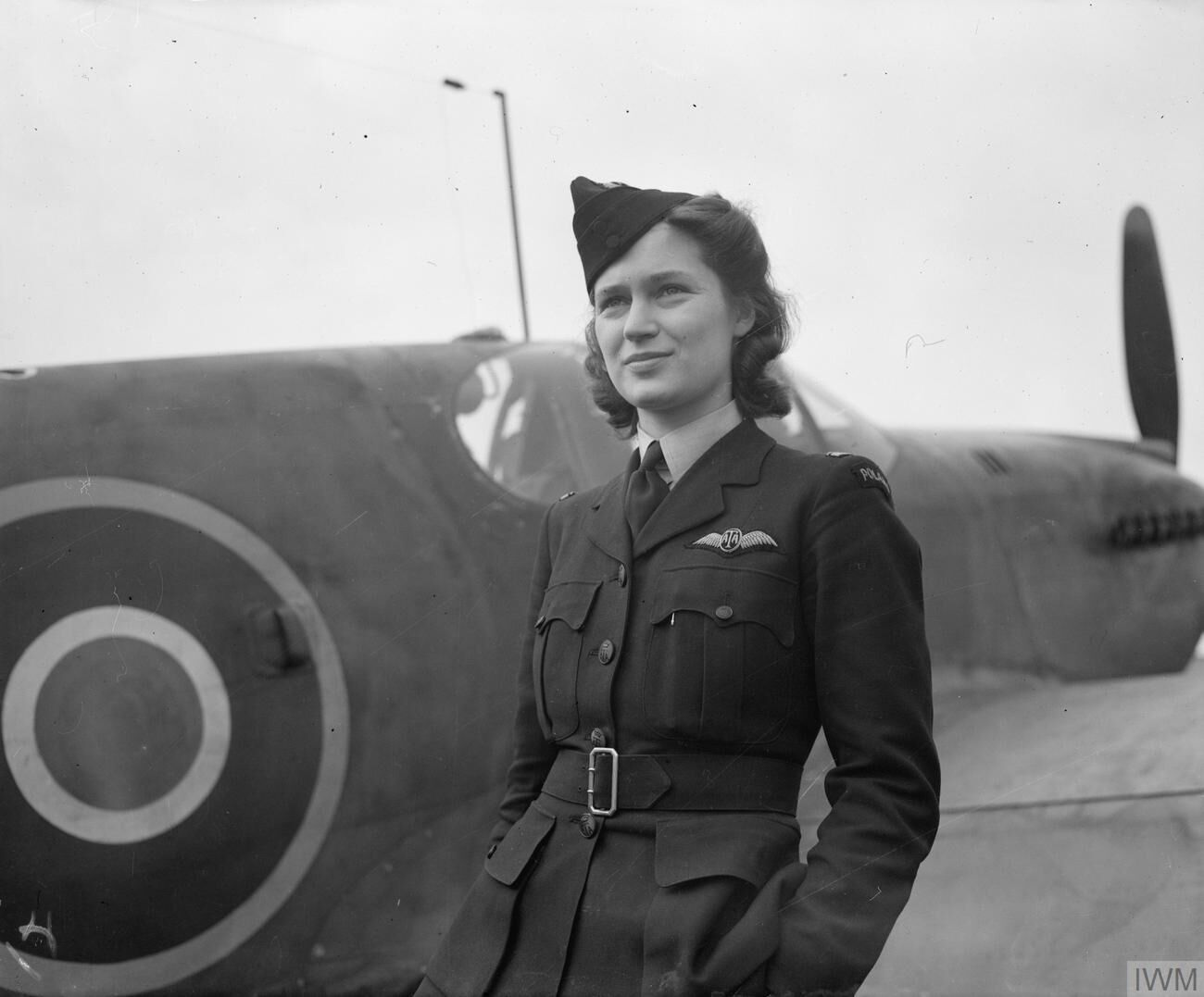
- Piłsudska, March 1943
- Born: 28 February 1920; Warsaw, Poland
- Died: 16 November 2014 (aged 94); Warsaw, Poland
- Other name: Jadwiga Jaraczewska
- Education: Wanda Szachtmajer Female High School
- Alma mater: Newnham College, Cambridge; Polish University Abroad
- Occupation: architect
- Employer: Office of Urban Planning (London County Council)
- Spouse: Andrzej Jaraczewski
- Children: Krzysztof Józef Jaraczeski; Joanna Maria Onyszkiewicz
- Parent(s): Józef Piłsudski (father); Aleksandra Szczerbińska (mother)
- Relatives: Bronisław Piłsudski (Uncle); Wanda Piłsudska (sister)
- Military career
- Allegiance: Poland; United Kingdom
- Branch: Polish Air Forces; RAF: Air Transport Auxiliary
- Service years: 1942-1944
- Rank: Second Officer (Flying Officer)
- Units: 1st Ferry Pool, White Waltham
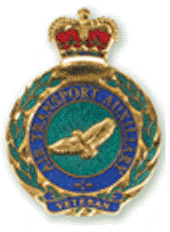
- Awards

Jadwiga Piłsudska-Jaraczewska (Polish: [jadˈviɡa piwˈsutska jaraˈt͡ʂɛfska]; 28 February 1920 – 16 November 2014) was a Polish pilot who served in the Air Transport Auxiliary during the Second World War. She was one of two daughters of Józef Piłsudski.

== Life and career ==
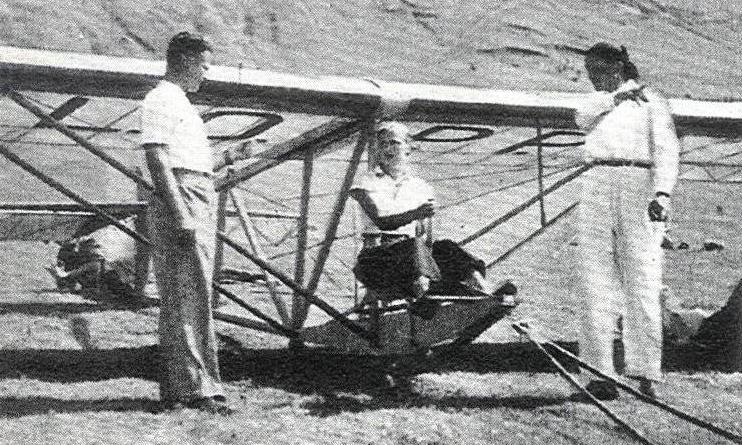
Piłsudska learning to fly at 17

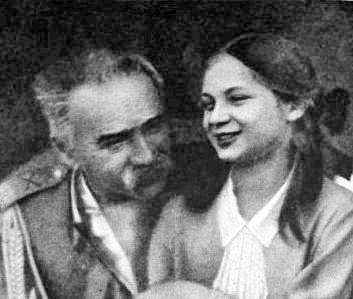
Marshal Piłsudski with daughter

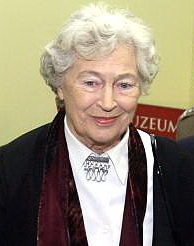
Piłsudska

Piłsudska was born on 28 February 1920 in Warsaw, the younger daughter of Marshal Józef Piłsudski, Poland's Chief of State (1918–22), first Marshal of Poland (1922–1935), and the woman who would later become his second wife, Aleksandra Piłsudska (née Aleksandra Szczerbińska).

In 1937 Piłsudska began flying gliders and obtained a pilot's licence. In 1939 she graduated from secondary school and decided to study aircraft engineering at the Warsaw Polytechnic.

In September 1939, Poland was invaded by Germany, initiating the Second World War, and her family realized that under the circumstances it would be prudent to leave the country immediately. Piłsudska fled with her mother and elder sister, Wanda, to Lithuania and eventually arrived in the United Kingdom. She resumed her studies, in 1940, matriculating at Newnham College, Cambridge University in architecture.

Later she acquired her aircraft pilot's license, and in July 1942, she joined the Air Transport Auxiliary. With the rank of second officer (flying officer) she flew unarmed military aircraft in the skies of wartime Britain and was, with Anna Leska and the Lithuanian-Pole Barbara Wojtulanis, one of several Polish women who served as wartime ferry pilots in Britain.

She took leave of absence to become a student at the Polish School of Architecture, at the Polish University Abroad (housed in Liverpool University), from 1944 to 1946, and then on the Liverpool Town Planning Course from 1946 to 1948.

In 1944, she married Polish Navy Lieutenant Andrzej Jaraczewski. She had two children: a son, Christopher Joseph (in Polish Krzysztof Józef) and daughter, Jane Mary (in Polish Joanna Maria), who later married Polish politician Janusz Onyszkiewicz.

She worked as an architect for London County Council from 1948, before she and her husband set up their own furniture design business.

Due to the communist takeover in Poland, she remained in England after the war as a political émigré. Never accepting British citizenship, she used a Nansen passport, valid for all countries in the world, except Poland.

In 1977, she and her husband took part in the Silver Jubilee of Elizabeth II on board the MGB S-3 during the Thames River Pageant.

In 1990, with the collapse of the communist government, she returned to Poland and lived in Warsaw.

She died on 16 November 2014, in Warsaw at the age of 94.

== Honours ==
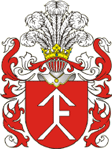
Piłsudski coat of arms

She has been honoured with a Bronze Cross of Merit with Swords and the Commander's Cross of the Order of Polonia Restituta.

== See also ==
- Piłsudski family
- Bronisław Piłsudski (1866–1918)
