= Michał Tyszkiewicz (1761–1839) =

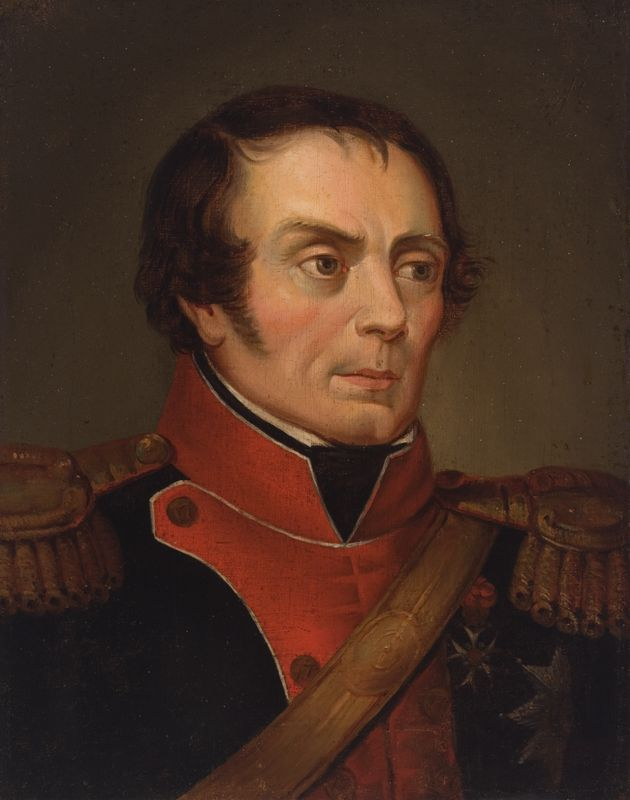
- Portrait of Michał Tyszkiewicz by an unknown painter
- Born: 1761
- Died: 4 September 1839 (aged 77–78); Valozhyn, Russian Empire

Michał Tyszkiewicz (Lithuanian: Mykolas Tiškevičius; 1761 – 4 September 1839) was a member of the noble Tyszkiewicz family and polkovnik in the French Grande Armée during Napoleon's invasion of Russia in 1812. He acquired several manors in present-day Lithuania, including those in Palanga and Biržai. He and his descendants built and reconstructed several manor houses that are some of the most important sites of manorialism heritage in Lithuania.

== Napoleonic Wars ==
During the Napoleon's invasion of Russia in 1812, Tyszkiewicz supported Napoleon in hopes of reestablishing the old Grand Duchy of Lithuania. On 5 July 1812, using his own funds, he began forming the 17th Lithuanian Uhlan Regiment. In recognition, Napoleon named Tyszkiewicz the regimental commander with the rank of colonel and Chevalier of the Legion of Honour. The regiment was attached to the X Corps of the Grande Armée. Tyszkiewicz became ill and did not participate in action; the command was taken over by major Kozlovsky. In 1904, his great-grandson published Histoire du 17me Régt de cavalerie Polonaise Lanciers du Cte Michel Tyszkiewicz 1812-1815 about the regiment.

== Estates ==
Tyszkiewicz made several large acquisitions of manors to become a large landowner. In 1811, after lengthy legal proceedings, he acquired the ruined Biržai Castle and dependent serfs from Dominik Hieronim Radziwiłł for 450,000 silver rubles. In 1819, Tyszkiewicz bought Raudondvaris Castle. It was gifted to his son Benedykt Emanuel Tyszkiewicz on the occasion of his wedding to Vanda Vankovich, daughter of Anton Vankovich. On 13 July 1824, Tyszkiewicz bought Palanga with manors in Darbėnai, Grūšlaukė, and Palanga from General Franciszek Ksawery Niesiołowski for 177,171 silver rubles. Palanga was developed as a seaside resort by his grandson Feliks Tyszkiewicz (1870–1932) who also built the current Tiškevičiai Palace. On 23 April 1828, Tyszkiewicz bought Nemėžis Manor and built the two-storey manor house that survives to this day.

== Family ==
He was son of Jozef Tyszkiewicz (1724–1815). Tyszkiewicz married Joanna Karp (1777–1816) and they had four children:

- Jan Tyszkiewicz (1801–1862), inherited Biržai where he built Astravas Manor and the Church of St. John the Baptist
- Jozef Tyszkiewicz (1805–1844), inherited Palanga, father of Egyptologist Michał Tyszkiewicz
- Benedykt Emanuel Tyszkiewicz (1807–1866), was gifted Raudondvaris where he built the Church of St. Theresa of the Infant Jesus (demolished in 1915, rebuilt in 1938)
- Joanna Tyszkiewiczówna (1816–1873), married Leon Sapieha

Tyszkiewicz was buried in Valozhyn.
