= Tyszkiewicz Palace =

Tyszkiewicz Palace or Tiškevičiai Palace can refer to several palaces of Tyszkiewicz family.

Places named Tyszkiewicz Palace or "former Tyszkiewicz Palace" and other historically owned properties of the family are located in Warsaw and Kraków, and in numerous towns of modern Poland, Belarus, Lithuania (in Palanga, Kretinga, Lahojsk, Raudondvaris, Berdychiv, Biržai, Kavarskas, Deltuva, Trakai, Lentvaris, Seredžius, and Ukraine.

Particular ones include:

- Tiškevičiai (Tyszkiewicz) Palace, Palanga
- Tyszkiewicz Palace, Warsaw
- TTiškevičiai (Tyszkiewicz) Palace, Biržai and Astravas Manor
