= Palanga Amber Museum =

- Palangos gintaro muziejus

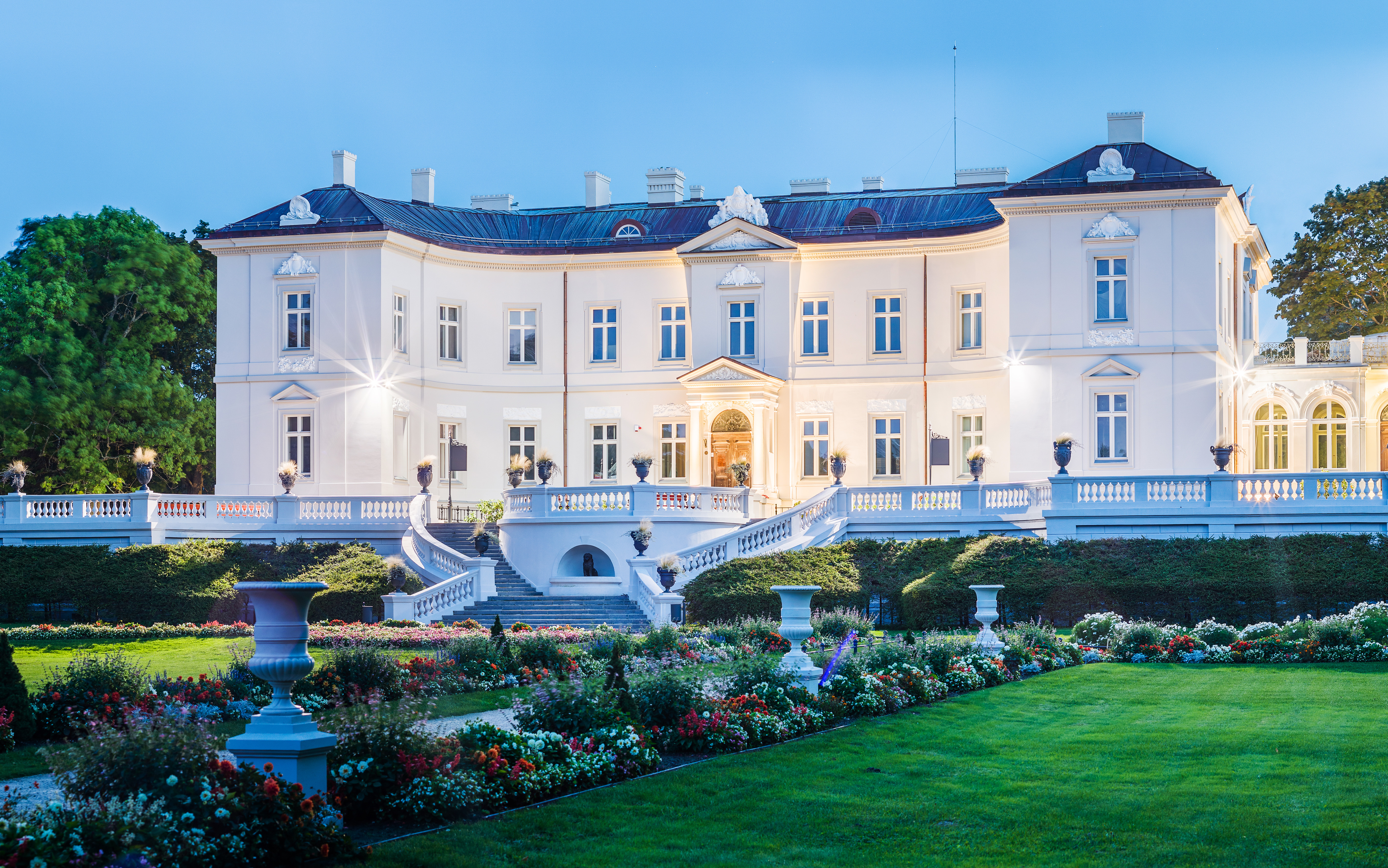
- The Palanga Amber Museum, also known as Tiškevičiai Palace, in Palanga, Lithuania
- Established: 1963; 63 years ago
- Location: Palanga, Lithuania
- Coordinates: 55.906944°N 21.055833°E
- Type: Art Museum
- Key holdings: Sun Stone
- Owner: Lithuanian Art Museum
- Website: www.pgm.lt

The Palanga Amber Museum (Lithuanian: Palangos gintaro muziejus), near the Baltic Sea in Palanga, Lithuania, is a branch of the Lithuanian National Museum of Art. It is housed in the restored 19th-century Tiškevičiai Palace and is surrounded by the Palanga Botanical Garden. The museum's collection of amber comprises about 28,000 pieces, of which about 15,000 contain inclusions of insects, spiders, or plants. About 4,500 pieces of amber are exhibited; many of these are items of artwork and jewelry.

== History and background ==
The Baltic Sea coast has been a source of Eurasian amber trade since prehistoric times (see Amber Road). Neolithic artifacts made of amber were discovered in nearby Juodkrantė in the 19th century - these artifacts unfortunately disappeared during the 20th century. Lithuanian mythology, folklore, and art have long associations with amber; the legend of Jūratė and Kastytis imagines an undersea palace of amber under the Baltic, which was shattered by Perkūnas, the god of thunder. Its fragments were said to be the source of the amber that still washes up on the beaches nearby.

Amber workshops appeared in Palanga during the 17th century; guilds devoted to the material functioned in Brügge, Lübeck, Danzig, and Königsberg. By the end of the 18th century Palanga was the center of the Russian Empire's amber industry. In the years preceding World War I about 2,000 kilograms of raw amber were processed in Palanga annually.

In 1897 Feliks Tyszkiewicz, a member of an old Ruthenian/Lithuanian noble family that had long had a presence in Palanga, built the Neo-Renaissance-style palace that now houses the museum. Designed by the German architect Franz Heinrich Schwechten, it fell into disrepair after the disruptions of World War I and World War II.

The palace was restored in 1957 according to plans by the architect Alfredas Brusokas. It opened as an amber museum in 1963 as a branch of the Lithuanian Museum of Fine Arts, with a small collection of about 480 pieces; it received its millionth visitor on August 13, 1970. The palace was incorporated into the Lithuanian Art Museum during the 1990s, and continues to expand.

== Exhibits ==
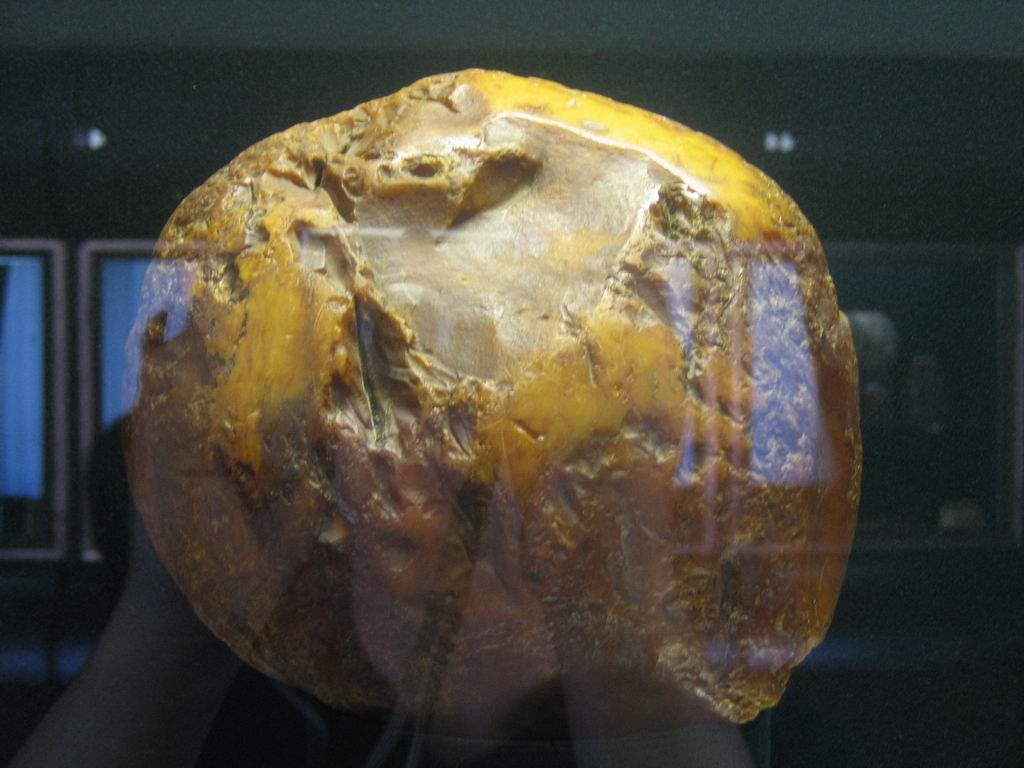
One of the largest amber pieces in Europe, the Amber Sun or Sun Stone, exhibited in the museum

The exhibition areas open to the public include 15 rooms covering about 750 square meters; a chapel connected to the palace houses temporary exhibitions. The museum is thematically divided into the scientific and cultural/artistic aspects of amber.

The first floor is dedicated to displays that illustrate the formation and composition of amber. Amber in the area arose from deltaic deposits of rivers flowing from Fennoscandia in the Eocene period, about 40 to 45 million years ago. The processes via which resin is changed into amber by microorganisms, oxidation, and polymerization are illustrated. Samples of microdrops and microicicles (i.e. "amber within amber") are among the displayed items.

The museum holds Europe's third largest amber specimen, the "Sun Stone", of size 210x190x150 mm and weighing 3,526 grams, which has been stolen twice. Amber from other areas of the world is also part of the collection.

The cultural and artistic exhibits include a 15th-century ring, a 16th-century cross, and amber jewelry from the past four centuries, as well as a number of rosaries, cigarette holders, and decorative boxes. The missing amber artifacts that were dated to the Neolithic era have been reconstructed by archeologists. Selections of modern amber work are part of the collection, including pieces by the Lithuanian artists Horstas Taleikis, Dionyzas Varkalis, Jonas Urbonas, and others.

== Botanical park ==
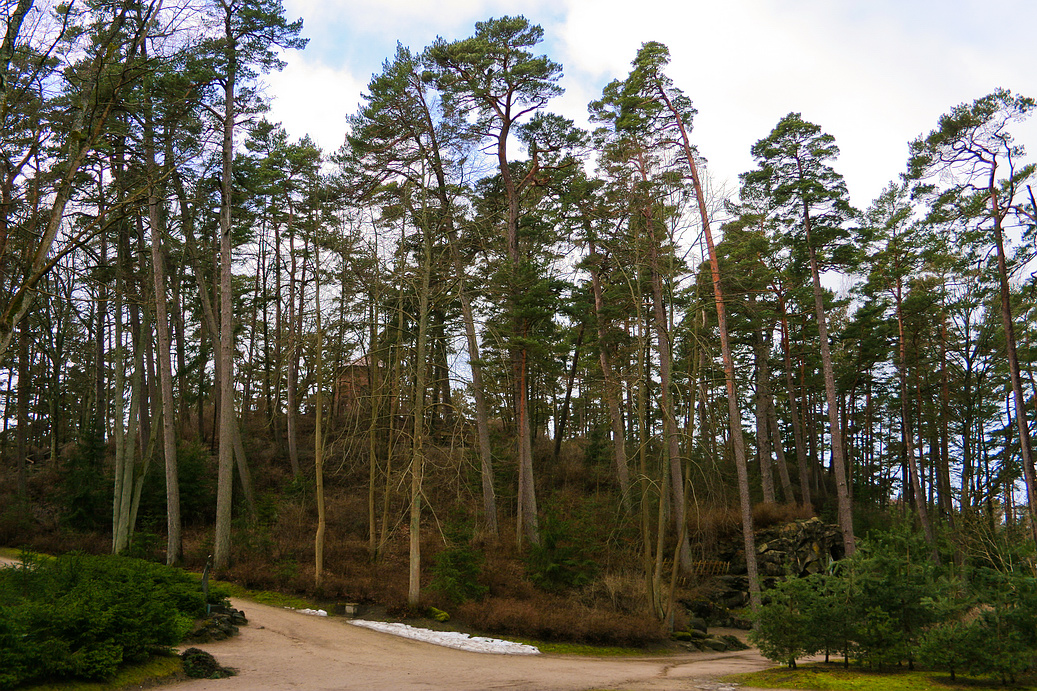
The Birutė Hill in spring, presumable burial place of Grand Duchess Birutė

The gardens surrounding the museum cover about 100 hectares. They were designed by the French landscape architect and botanist Édouard André (1840–1911) and his son René Édouard André, assisted by the Belgian gardener Buyssen de Coulon. Local historians have estimated that they originally contained about 500 varieties of trees and shrubs, some brought from gardens in Berlin. About 250 imported and 370 native plant species are now represented at the park; 24 of these are included in Lithuania's 1992 list of endangered species. Pine and fir trees well-adapted to growing in the sandy and peaty soil predominate.

The park features a rose garden, greenhouse, rotunda, a sculpture of Eglė, the Queen of Serpents, a Holocaust memorial, ponds, and gazebos; during the summer it hosts concerts and festivals. It contains an ancient forested sand dune, known as Birutė's Hill (Lithuanian: Birutės kalnas), topped with a chapel dedicated to Saint George that was built in 1869. According to legend, this dune is the place where Grand Duke of Lithuania Kęstutis met his wife Birutė, a pagan priestess, and where she is supposed to have been interred in 1382; it has been a pilgrimage site ever since.
