= Astravas Manor =

Building in Biržai, Lithuania

Coordinates: 56°13′15″N 24°46′12″E

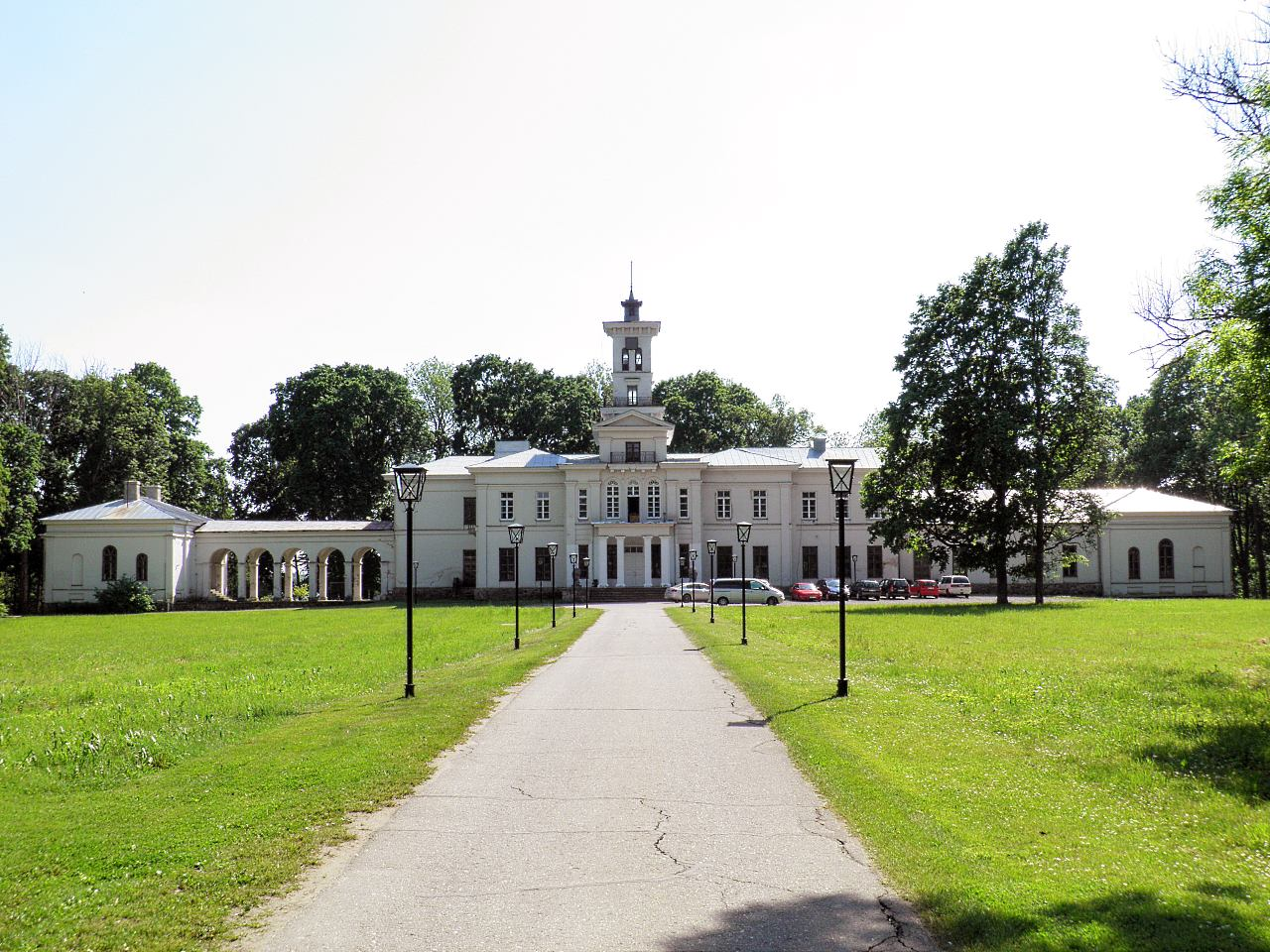
- Interactive map of the Astravas Manor area

General information
- Location: Astravo st 17, Biržai 41190, Lithuania
- Construction started: 1849
- Completed: 1862

Astravas Manor is a manor in the Biržai suburb of Astravas, Lithuania.

== History ==
=== Radziwiłł Family ===
In the mid 16th century, the Biržai area became a Duchy and the centre of territories belonging to a branch of the influential Radziwiłł family.

=== Michał Tyszkiewicz (1761–1839) ===
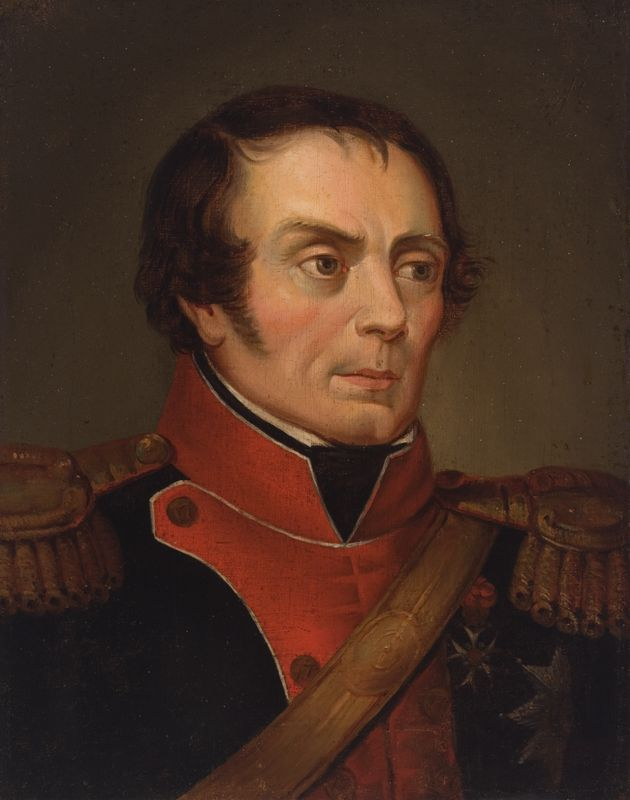
Michał Tyszkiewicz

In 1811 Duke Dominik Hieronim Radziwiłł sold the Biržai lands to Count Michał Tyszkiewicz for 450,000 silver rubles.

The approval of the purchase and sale agreement was hindered by the fact that other descendants of the Radziwiłł family made claims, as well as by the fact that Count Michał Tyszkiewicz led a Lithuanian regiment fighting in Napoleon's army.

It took 33 years of litigation before, in 1844, Tsar Nicholas I of Russia recognized the Duchy of Biržai as the possession of Michał Tyszkiewicz's son Jan Tyszkiewicz.

=== Jan Tyszkiewicz (1801-1862) ===
As Biržai Castle was uninhabitable, the Tyszkiewicz family established their summer retreat at Astravas, across Lake Širvėnas from Biržai.

Jan Tyszkiewicz commissioned architect Tomasz Tyszecki to build Astravas Manor.

The Italian villa-style two-storey palace with belvedere tower was built in several stages during 1849–1862, and exudes a characteristic Romantic era elegance.

Jan Tyszkiewicz freed 1128 serfs, and gave, to those without land, two silver rubles each. He also established and maintained a school for 150 students. He built roads in the vicinity of Biržai, bridges and planted forests. His contemporaries wrote that he was a philanthropist, whose work greatly benefitted Birzai.

Jan was also a passionate traveler and hunter. On August 20, 1862, returning from hunting in Belarus, a bridge collapsed under his four-horse carriage. He fell from height and was killed.

As Jan had no heirs, Astravas became the property of his nephew, Michał Tyszkiewicz (1828-1897).

Michał, however, let his second-cousin Eustachy Tyszkiewicz (1814-1873) settle at Astravas so he could devote all his time to scholarly pursuits.

=== Michał and Eustachy Tyszkiewicz ===
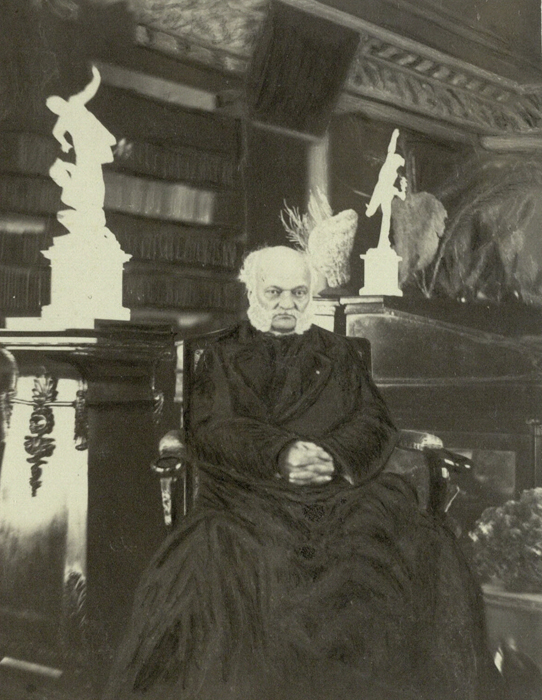
Eustachy Tyszkiewicz in Astravas Manor

==== Eustachy Tyszkiewicz (1814-1873) ====
Eustachy Tyszkiewicz is considered the ‘father of archaeology’ in the former Grand Duchy of Lithuania. He was the creator of the Vilnius Archaeological Commission (which included Count Adam Broël-Plater (1836-1909) - owner of Švėkšna Manor - as a member) and of the Museum of Antiquities in Vilnius. The initial Museum of Antiquities collection consisted of about 6,000 items gifted by Eustachy Tyszkiewicz from his personal collection - more than half of the items were books, while other items were coins, medals, portraits, engravings and historical artefacts. It was the first public museum in the former Grand Duchy of Lithuania and is considered a predecessor of the National Museum of Lithuania even though only a handful of items from the Museum of Antiquities ended up at the National Museum. Tyszkiewicz chaired the commission and curated the museum until it was nationalized and reorganized after the failed Polish Uprising of 1863. Almost all items related to the former Polish–Lithuanian Commonwealth to the Rumyantsev Museum in Moscow.

After losing his life's work, Eustachy Tyszkiewicz retired to Astravas Manor. There he studied local history, organized the manor's library and the archives of the Radziwiłł family, wrote historical treatises and gathered primary sources for publication.

In 1871 he returned to Vilnius, where he died in 1874 and was buried in Rasos Cemetery.

==== Michał Tyszkiewicz (1828-1897) ====
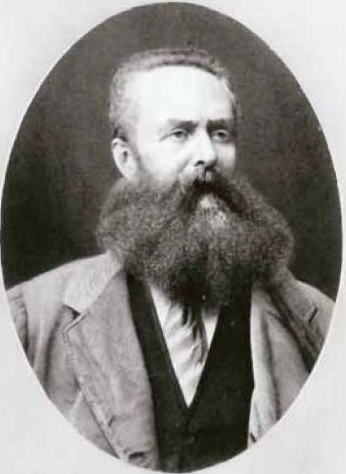
Michał Tyszkiewicz (1828-1897)

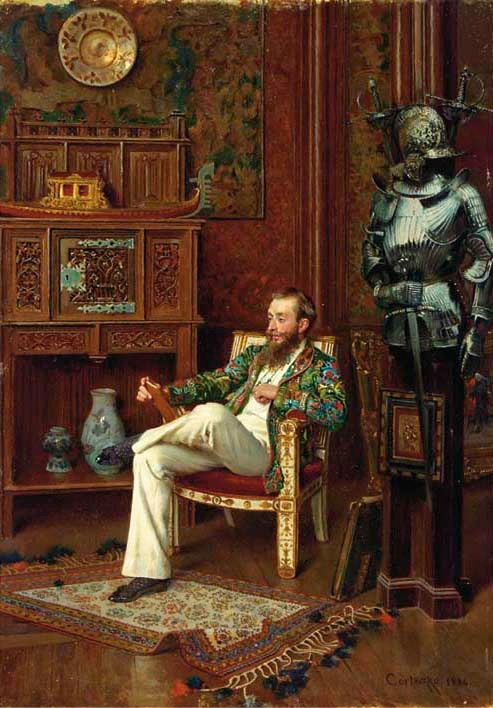
Michał Tyszkiewicz 1884 by Oreste Cortazzo (1836-1910)

Meanwhile, after falling in love with a cabaret dancer in Paris, Michał Tyszkiewicz (1828-1897) left his wife, Maria née Radziwiłł (1830-1902) and family and lived in Italy and France.

He too was greatly inspired by archaeology and antiquities. In 1861, he went to Egypt, where he received permission to dig from the Viceroy Said Pasha. He worked in Luxor behind the temple of Karnak and in the Valley of the Kings. He also purchased two private collections in Cairo.

In 1862 he moved from Paris to Naples, where he involved himself in various digs, including at Cumae and Baiae.

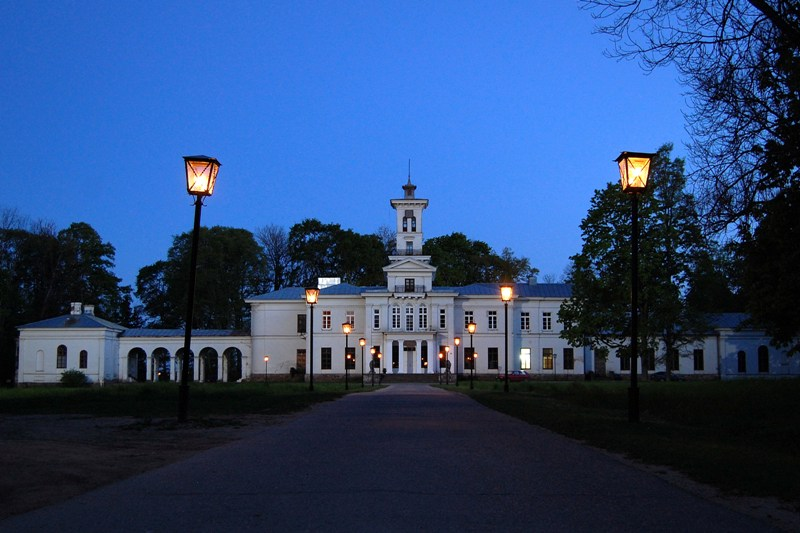
Astravas Manor in the evening

Disappointed with his archaeological findings there, he moved to Rome in 1865 where he again set his sights on digging and collecting. He wrote in 1865 that he had:

...during the last few years, come into some property which produced a large income, and I proposed to devote this income to the satisfaction of my tastes, especially as the moment chanced to be particularly favourable to collectors.

The property he refers to is probably Biržai and Astravas, among possibly others.

His explorations around Rome were more successful and yielded some significant discoveries.

Michał revisited Egypt in 1867–1868, building up a collection during his travels. He achieved such eminence as a collector that he can be counted as one of the most significant European collectors in the second half of the 19th century. Many of his best pieces were donated or sold to the Louvre, the Vatican Museum and the British Museum. The full collection is now split between different cities in Lithuania, Paris, London, Copenhagen, Berlin, Boston, Rome, and the Tyszkiewicz palace at Lahojsk, Belarus. A small part of it is in Poland in the National Museum in Warsaw.

Michał Tyszkiewicz died in Rome on November 18, 1897.

He was remembered for:

...his long experience, his passion for beautiful things, his delicate instinct for style, and also the urbanity and good fellowship which rendered intercourse with the friend we have lost so especially delightful.

=== Jan Leon Antoni Tyszkiewicz (1852-1901) ===
Astravas was inherited by his eldest son, Józef Tyszkiewicz.

However, as Józef was unable to manage the estate, he passed it to his younger brother, Jan Leon Antoni Tyszkiewicz (1852-1901).

Jan married Maria Potocka (1856-1921), one of the richest brides of the times, a blonde beauty with fiery temperament. Along with his own fortune, Jan Tyszkiewicz became one of the richest people in Lithuania. In 1882 he restored the Biržai brewery (the same place where Biržai beer is now operating) - he bought German equipment and hired German brewers. The Bavarian beer made in Biržai was awarded the medal of the exhibition even in Germany itself.

=== Alfred Tyszkiewicz (1882-1930) ===
The last owner of Astravas was Jan Tyszkiewicz's son, Count Alfred Tyszkiewicz.

Alfred was an officer of the 12th Hussar Regiment and worked at the Russian Embassy in London. He was a supporter of Lithuanian independence and attended the Paris Peace Conference. As a member of the diplomatic mission, he went to Rome to negotiate with the Pope on relations between Lithuania and the Holy See.

Count Alfred Tyszkiewicz also owned a small but beautiful, one-storey, light yellow villa in Kaunas at Laisvės Alėja 6, where Antanas Smetona lived when he first became President of Lithuania.

In the 1922 land reforms, Astravas Manor was expropriated.

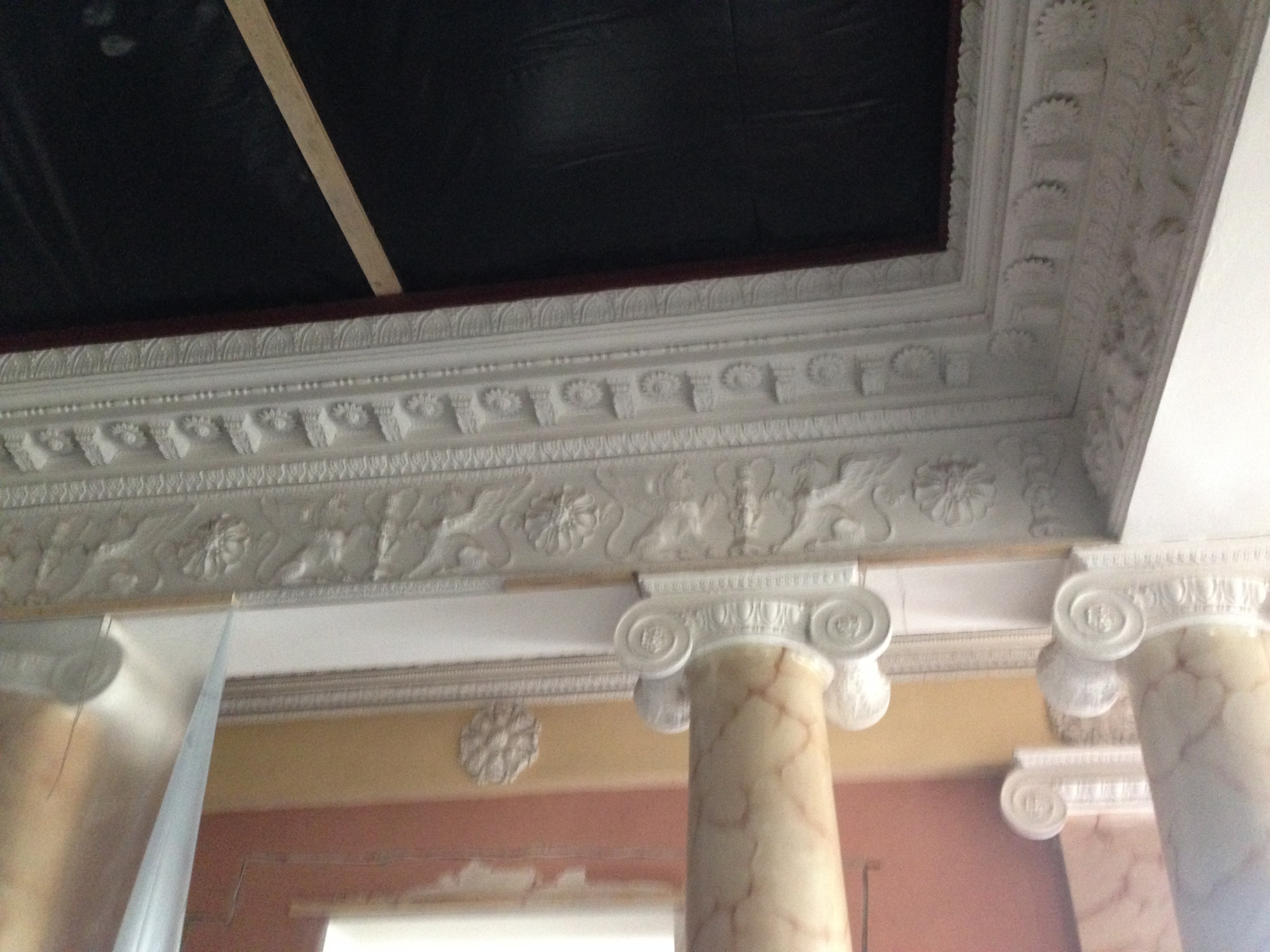
Astravas Manor interior detail 2018

Alfred Tyszkiewicz emigrated to Paris and, during the interwar period, rented out Astravas. Alfred Tyszkiewicz mostly lived in Paris (Avenue D ' Iéna 92) or in Verneuil Castle Indre Department (Château De Verneuil-Sur-Indre).

Count Alfred Tyszkiewicz died in Verneuil castle in 1930.

=== Povilas Variakojis (1892-1970) ===
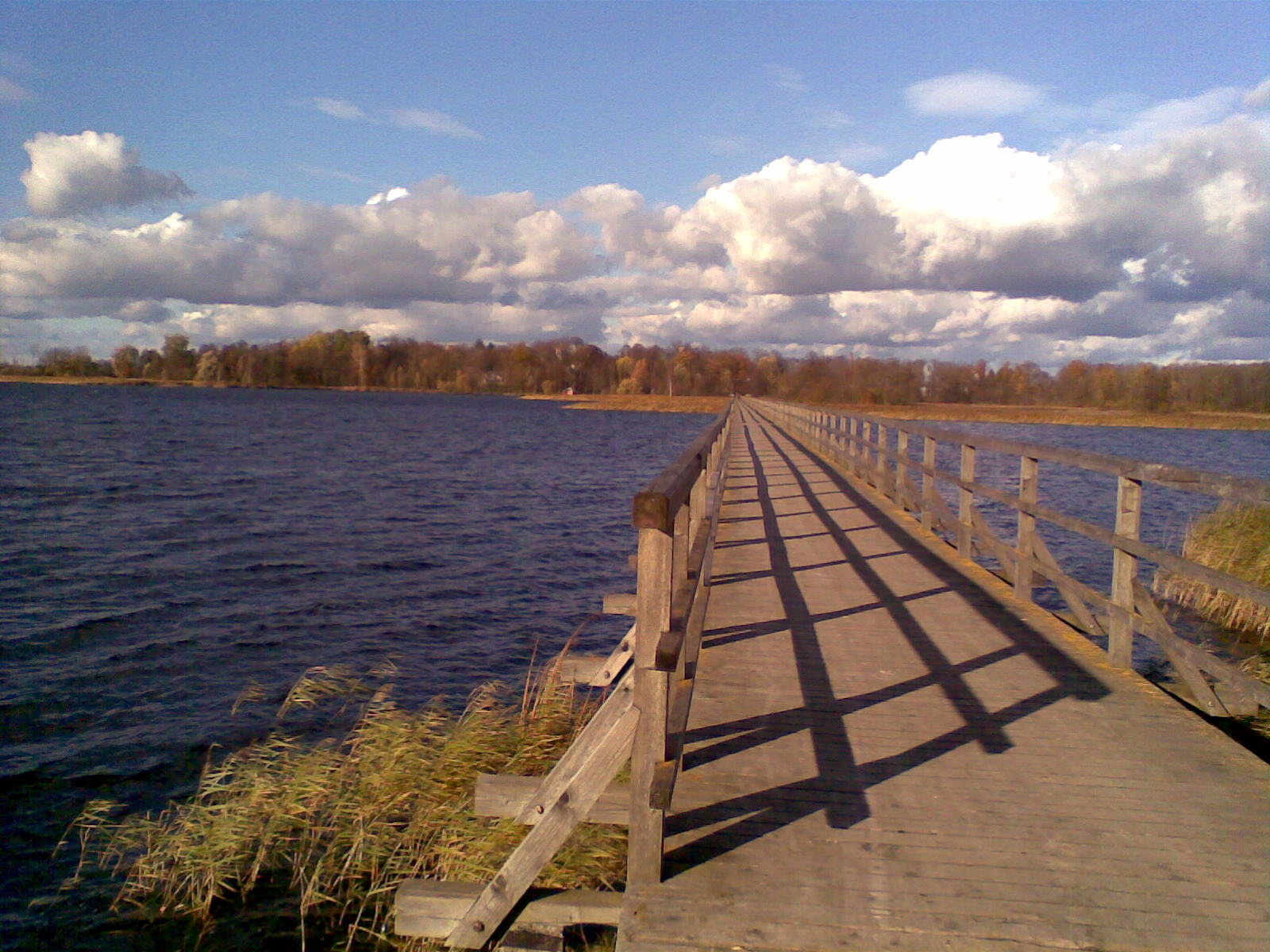
Pedestrian bridge to Astravas Manor

In 1931, Astravas was handed over to agronomist Povilas Variakojis

Harry Jannson rented Astravas manor from 1934 till 1941 and established the Linen Factory. He bought the Equipment from Leipzig Germany.

When writer Hypatia Yčas visited Biržai in the 1930s, she noted that:

A palace called Astrava, now in ruins, was across the water. This former estate of a local nobleman was well worth a visit. The building was deserted and falling into disrepair, but two majestic lions in stone continued to guard the front steps. The once splendid park was now a jungle of weeds.

Povilas Variakojis who, as guardian of the property, set up a wool spinning mill and then a linen factory. The linen factory Siūlas, is still in operation.

In order to make it easier for the workers living in Biržai to reach Astrava, a pedestrian bridge called the bridge was built on the eastern edge of Lake Širvėna.

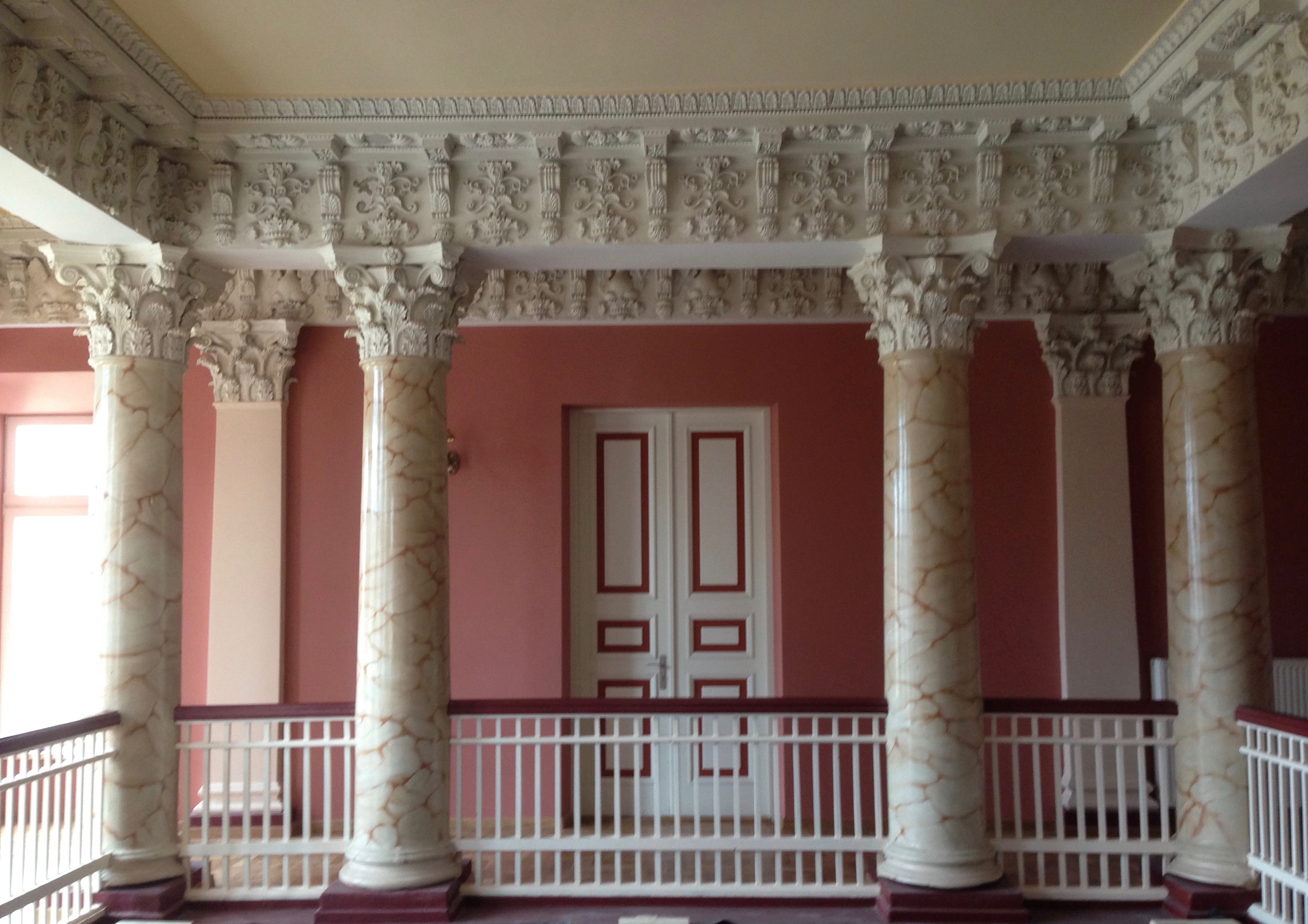
Astravas Dvaras Interior 2018

=== Soviet Period ===
In 1940 under the ‘Law on Land Reform of Foreign Citizens’, the property was taken over by the government and the estate was nationalized.

The damage that the estate sustained during World War II was repaired between 1955 and 1962.

The homestead of Astravas manor was restored, part of the park was arranged and in 1987. the pedestrian bridge over the lake connecting the manor house and Biržai town was rebuilt.

=== The Present Day ===
The mansion has a rich classical interior decorated with many sculptures. Decorative sculptures of Medici lions that stood at the entrance to the manor were replaced with copies, with the original sculptures being moved to the Vytautas the Great War Museum in Kaunas. The manor complex has a large classical park with a lot of tiny artificial lakes located within it.

It now houses offices for the linen factory.

== Writings ==
=== Michał Tyszkiewicz ===
- Diary of a Journey to Egypt and Nubia, Paris 1863.
- Memories of an old collector, translated into English by Mrs. Andrew Lang. Longmans, Green, London 1898.
