= Samuel Tyszkiewicz =

Polish typographer

- Occupation: Typographer

Samuel Tyszkiewicz (1 January 1889 – 12 July 1954) was a Polish typographer, and a member of the once powerful Tyszkiewicz noble family.
