= Belvédère tower =

Observation tower in Alsace, France

Coordinates: 47°43′45″N 7°20′37″E

The Tour du Belvédère is a 20-metre-tall (66 ft) observation tower located on Belvédère mountain near Mulhouse in Alsace, France. Tour du Belvédère was designed by Ph. Ant. Fauler, built in 1898 and is reminiscent of the Eiffel Tower.

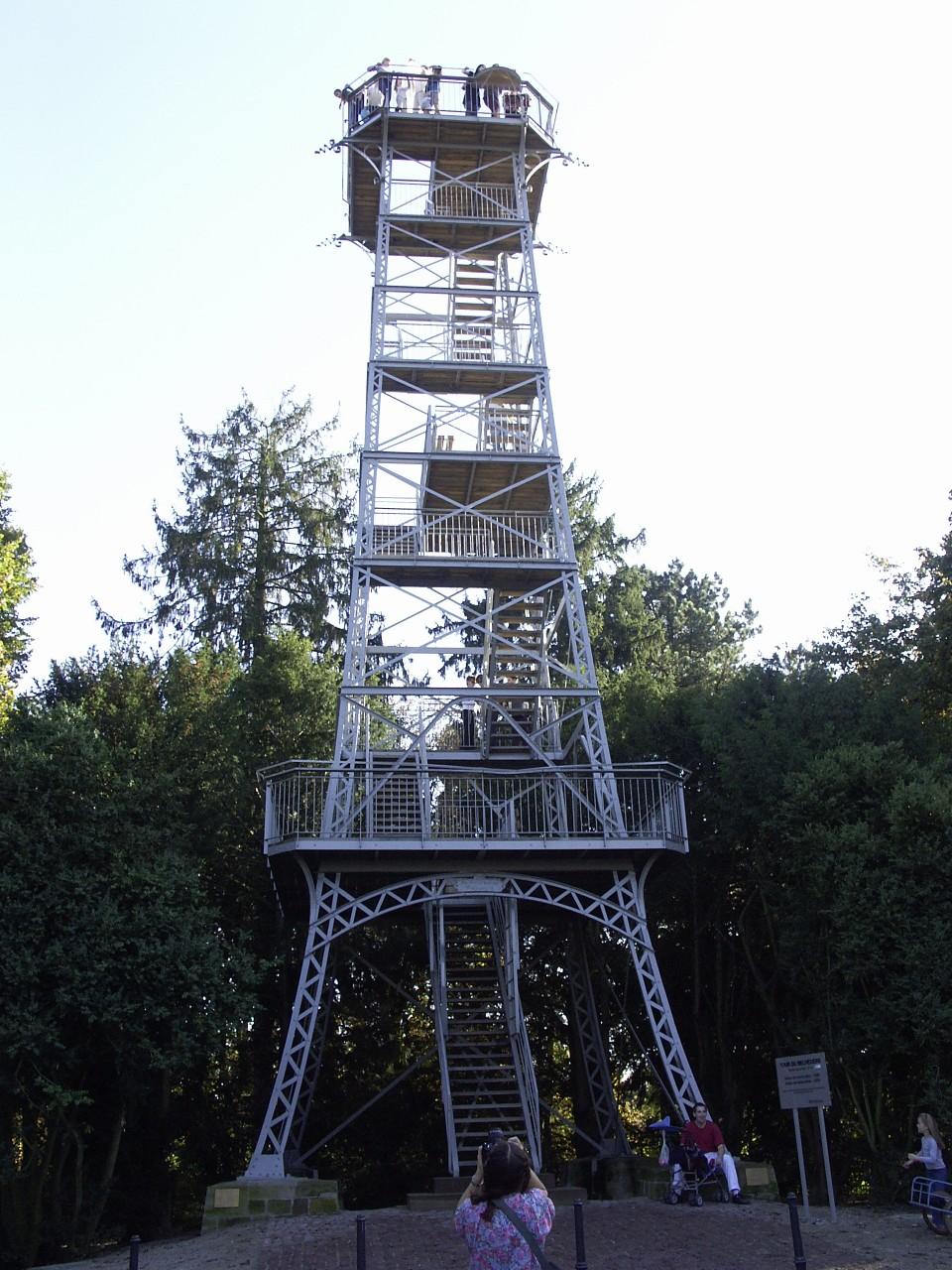
Tour du Belvédère

== See also ==
- List of towers
