= Tyszkiewicz family =

Polish–Lithuanian magnate family

Tyszkiewicz
- Leliwa.
- Current region: Lithuania, Poland, Ukraine, Belarus
- Members: Ludwik Tyszkiewicz; Teodor Tyszkiewicz; Stefan Tyszkiewicz
- Estates: Tyszkiewicz Palace; Tiškevičiai Palace; Lentvaris Manor

The House of Tyszkiewicz (Polish: Tyszkiewiczowie, singular: Tyszkiewicz, Belarusian: Тышкевічы, singular: Тышкевіч, Lithuanian: Tiškevičiai, singular: Tiškevičius, Ukrainian: Тишкевичі, singular: Тишкевич, Russian: Тышкевичи, singular: Тышкевич) was a wealthy and influential Polish-Lithuanian magnate family of Ruthenian origin, with roots traced to the times of the Grand Duchy of Lithuania. They held the Polish coat of arms Leliwa. Their nobility was reaffirmed in Polish–Lithuanian Commonwealth and the Russian Empire.

The family traces its roots to a 15th-century Ruthenian boyar Kalenik Mishkovich and derives from the name of his grandson, Tysha with the addition of the patronymic, resulting in Tyszkiewicz-Kalenicki. A branch of the family Germanised the name to Tischkowitz and a few members of this branch are still to be found in Germany and the UK.

Places named Tyszkiewicz Palace, "former Tyszkiewicz Palace", Tiškevičiai Palace, and other historical properties of the family are located in Warsaw, Kraków and Vilnius, as well as in numerous towns of modern Poland, Belarus, Lithuania and Ukraine (in Palanga, Kretinga, Lahojsk, Raudondvaris, Berdychiv, Biržai, Kavarskas, Deltuva, Trakai, Lentvaris, Seredžius, etc.)

== Notable members ==
- Count Eustachy Tyszkiewicz (1814–1874), nobleman and archaeologist
- Janusz Skumin Tyszkiewicz (1570–1642), Polish–Lithuanian nobleman and politician who was a sponsor of Baroque music
- Janusz Tyszkiewicz Łohojski (1590–1649), Polish–Lithuanian magnate and politician
- Katarzyna Eugenia Skumin Tyszkiewicz (c. 1610–1648), Polish noblewoman (daughter of Janusz Skumin Tyszkiewicz)
- Count Konstanty Tyszkiewicz (1806–1868), Polish-Lithuanian noble, archaeologist and ethnographer
- Ludwik Skumin Tyszkiewicz, Field Lithuanian Hetman (Grand Treasurer) of Polish–Lithuanian Commonwealth
- Count Michal Tyszkiewicz (1828–1897), collector and amateur Egyptologist
- Count Michał Zygmunt Tyszkiewicz (1903–1974), diplomat and songwriter
- Samuel Tyszkiewicz (1889–1954) was a Polish typographer
- Stefan Tyszkiewicz (1894–1976), engineer and inventor, soldier and political activist married into the extended Russian imperial family
- Tadeusz Tyszkiewicz, (1774–1852), a general
- Teodor Skumin Tyszkiewicz, Grand Treasurer of Lithuania of Polish–Lithuanian Commonwealth
- Count Mykhaylo Tyshkevych (1857—1930) - Ukrainian politician, patron of Prosvita Society, ambassador of Ukrainian State to Vatican.

== Family estates ==
- Makhnivka, Koziatyn Raion

== Manors ==
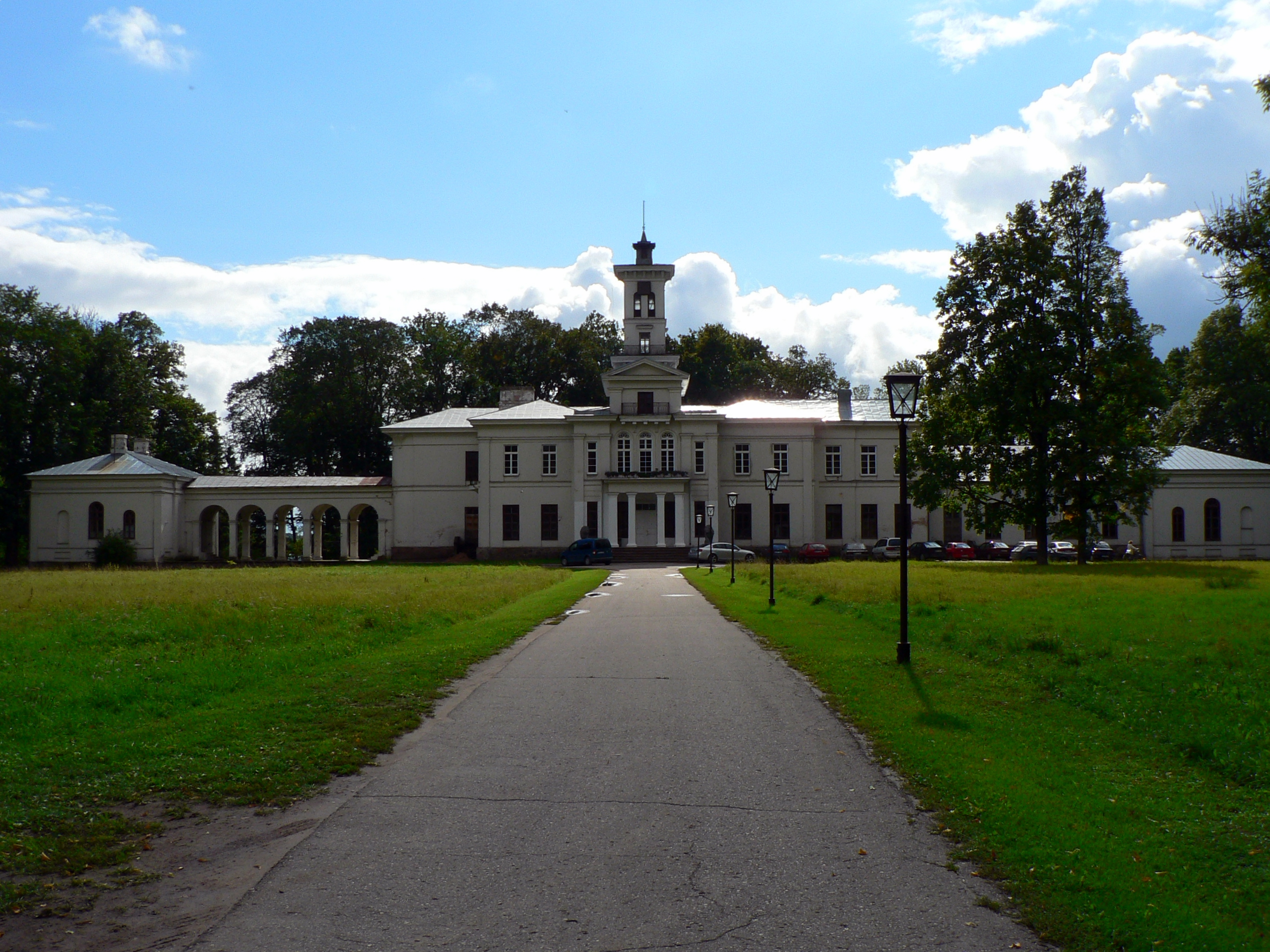
Astravas Manor

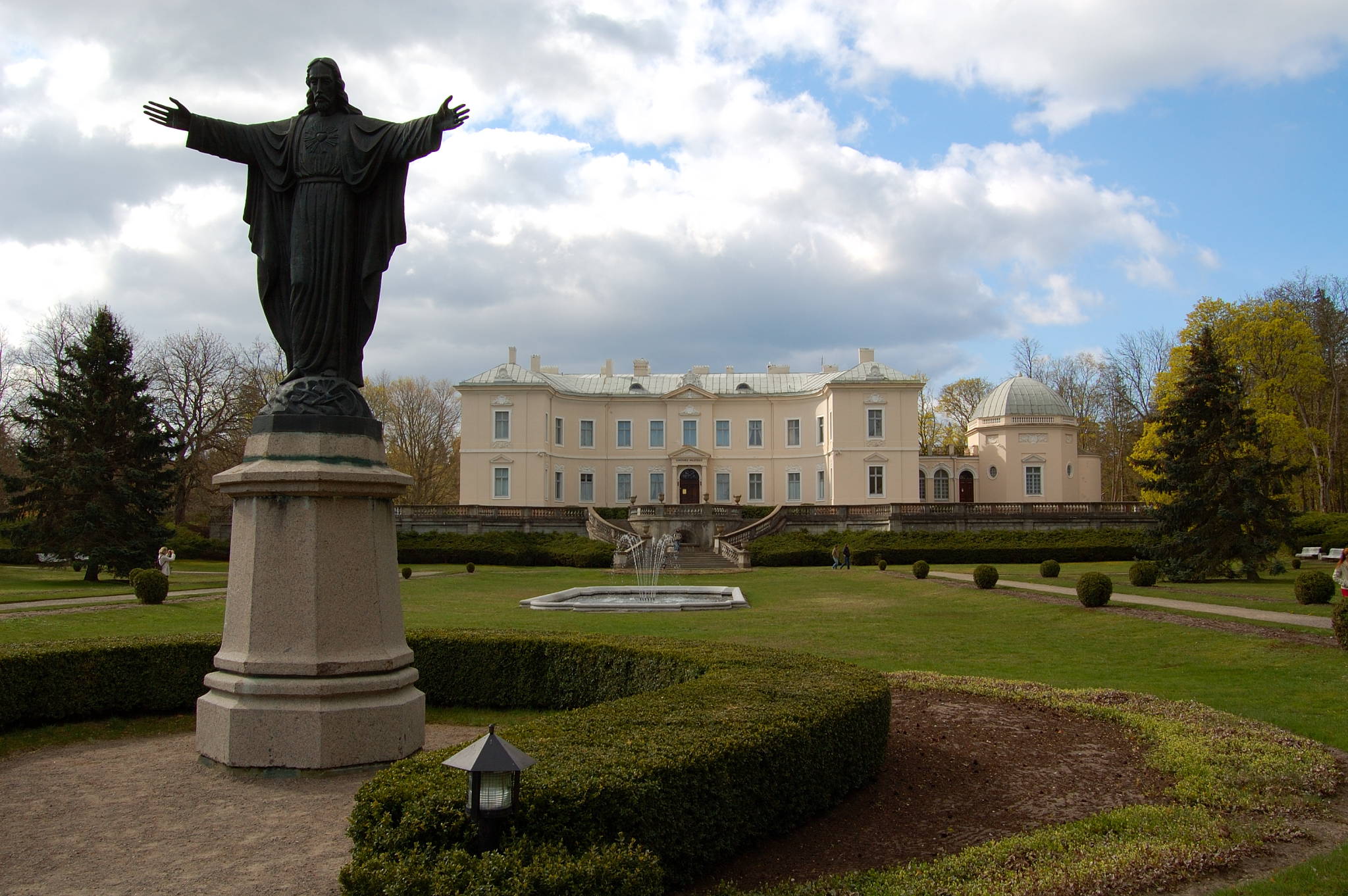
Tiškevičiai Palace, Palanga

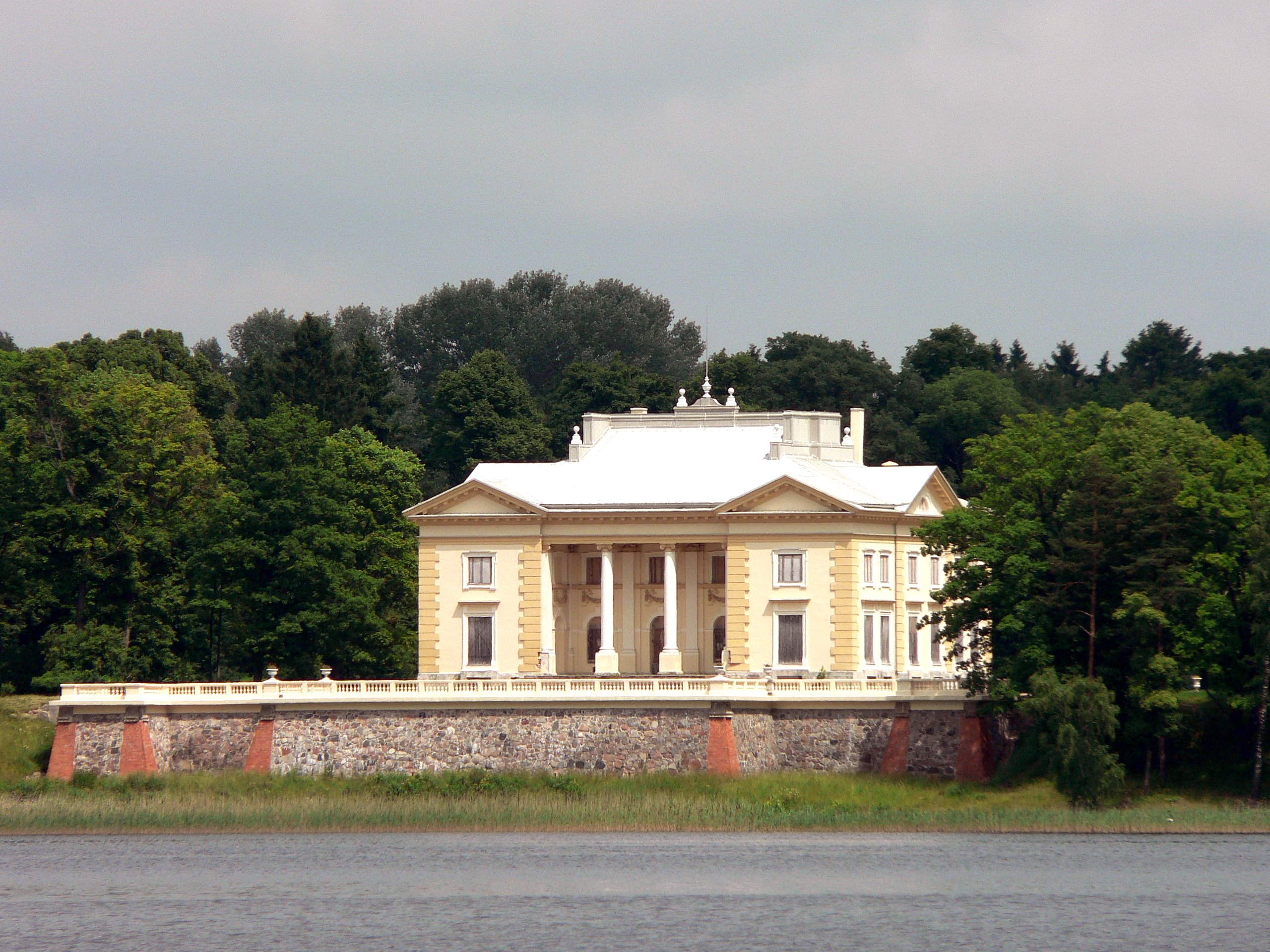
Užutrakis Manor on Lake Galvė, Trakai

== Gallery ==
Palaces connected with the Tyszkiewicz family

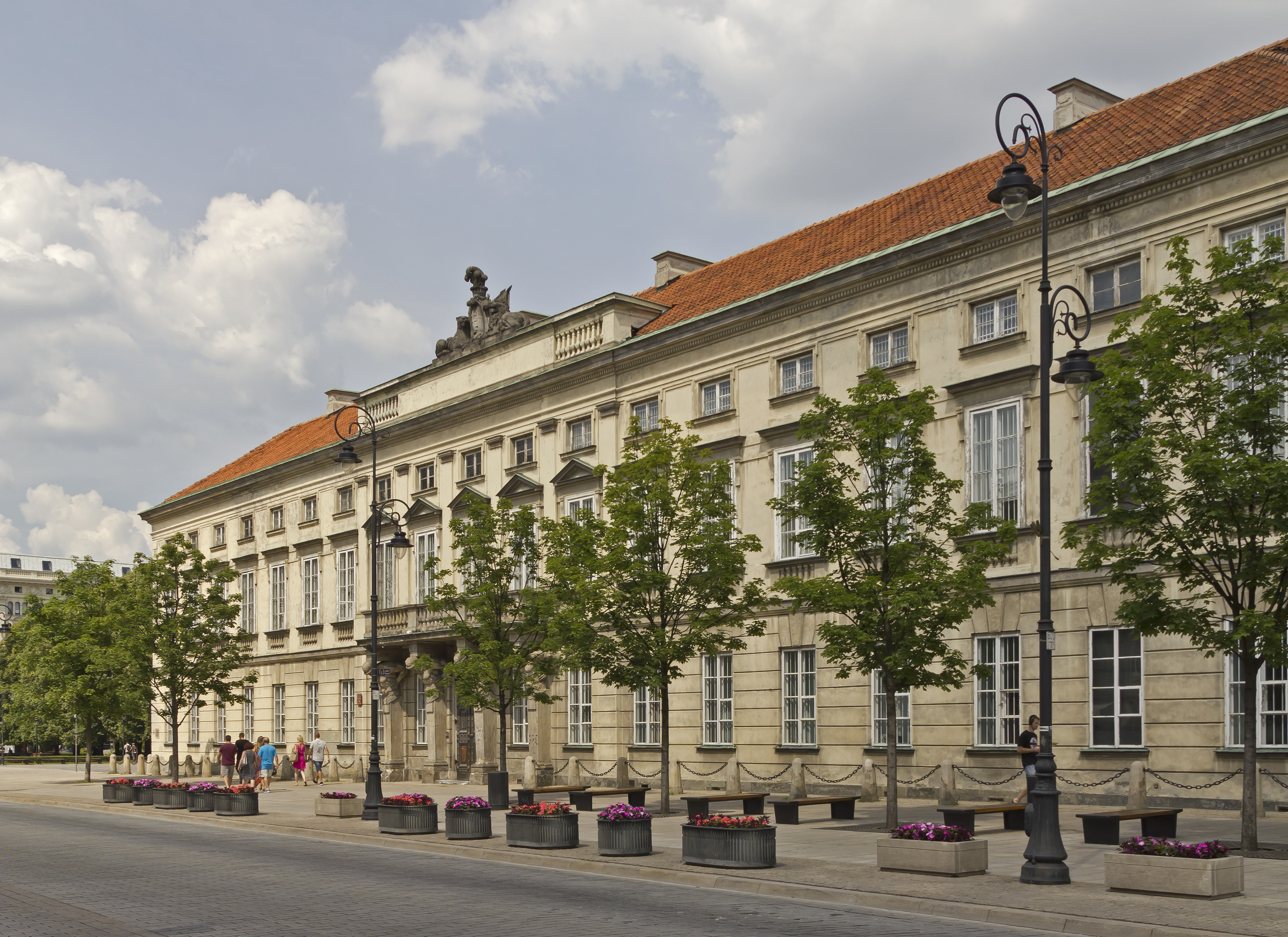
Tyszkiewicz palace in Warsaw

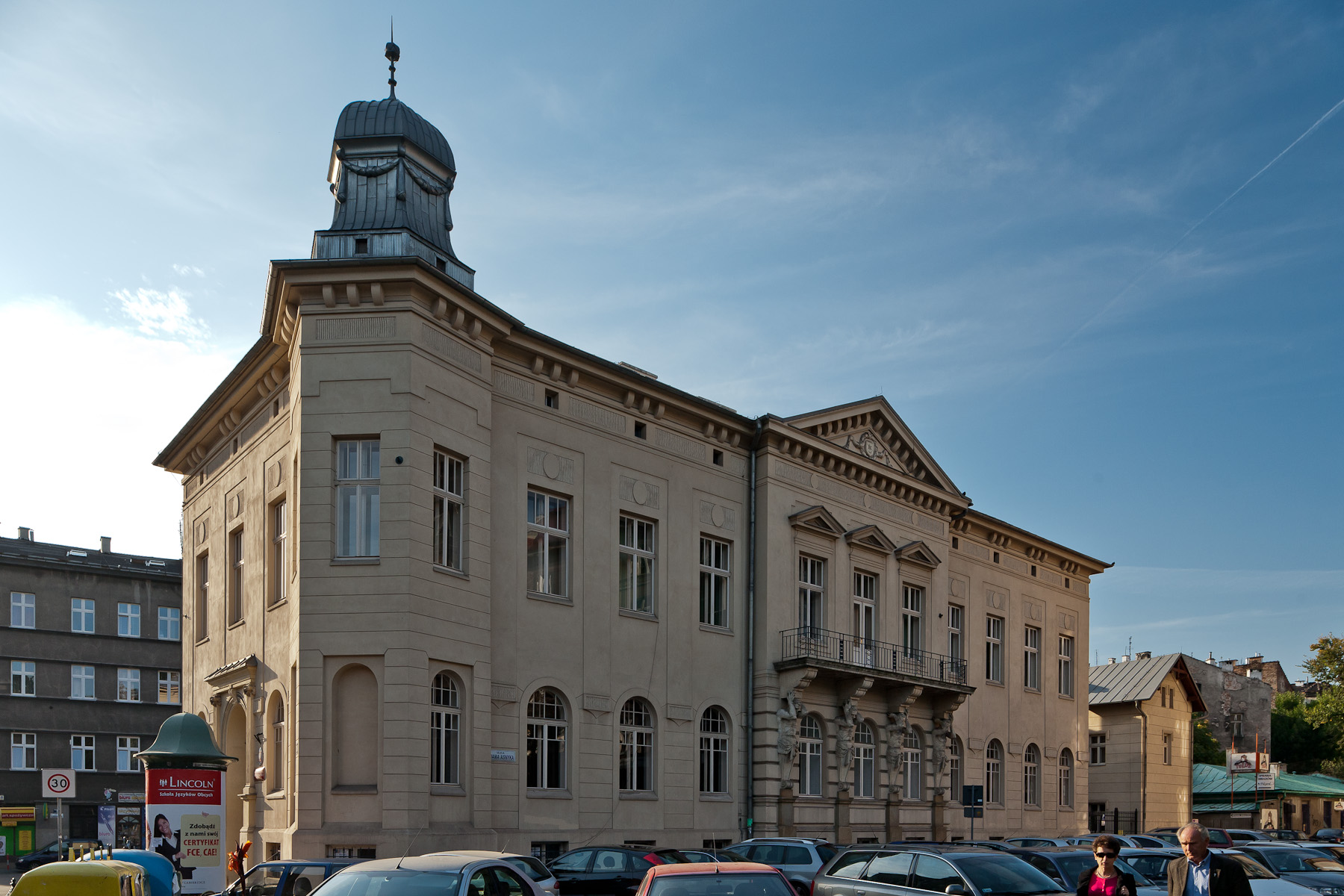
Tyszkiewicz palace in Kraków

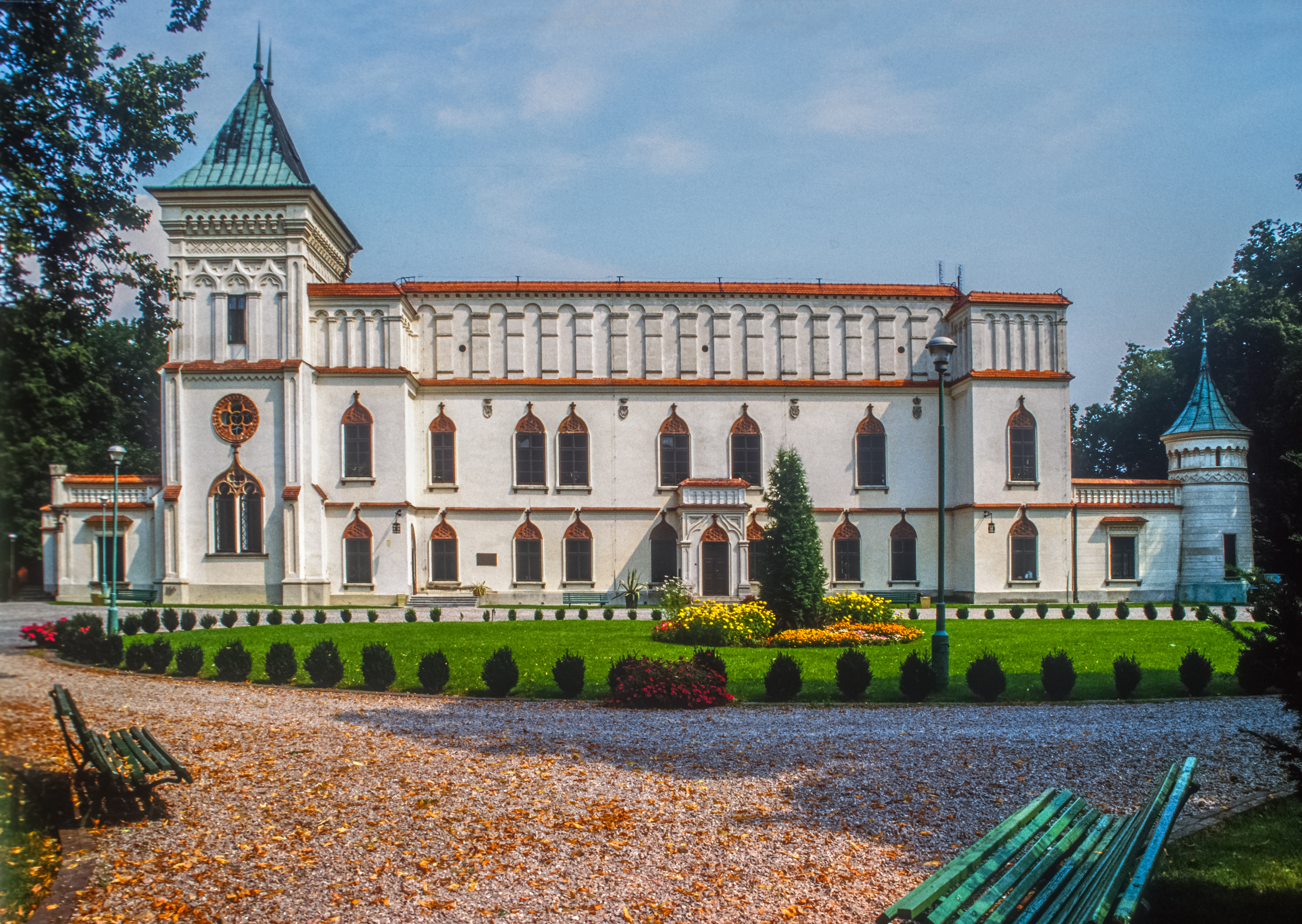
Palace in Przecław

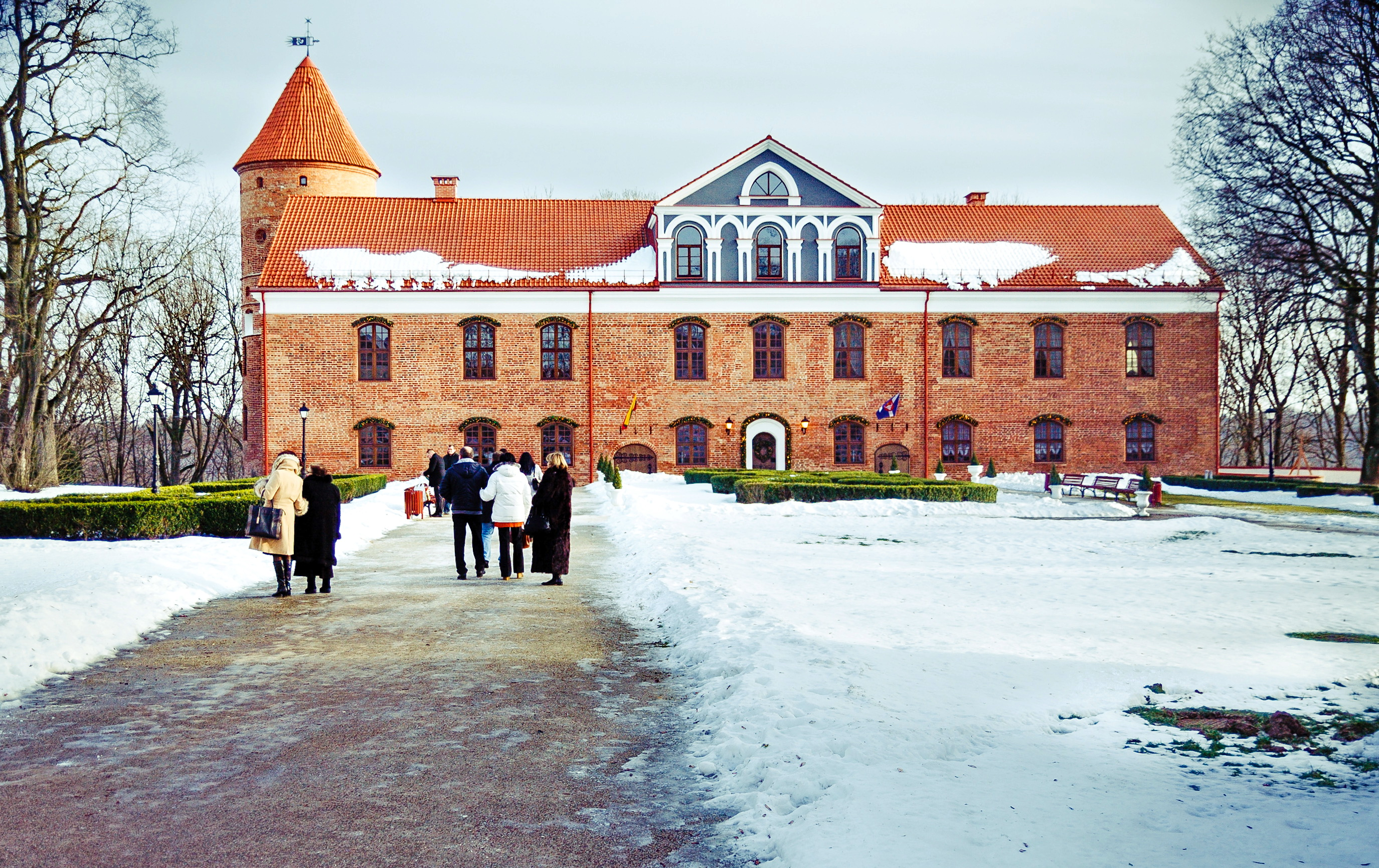
The 'Red Manor', Raudondvaris Castle with Basilica of St Teresa

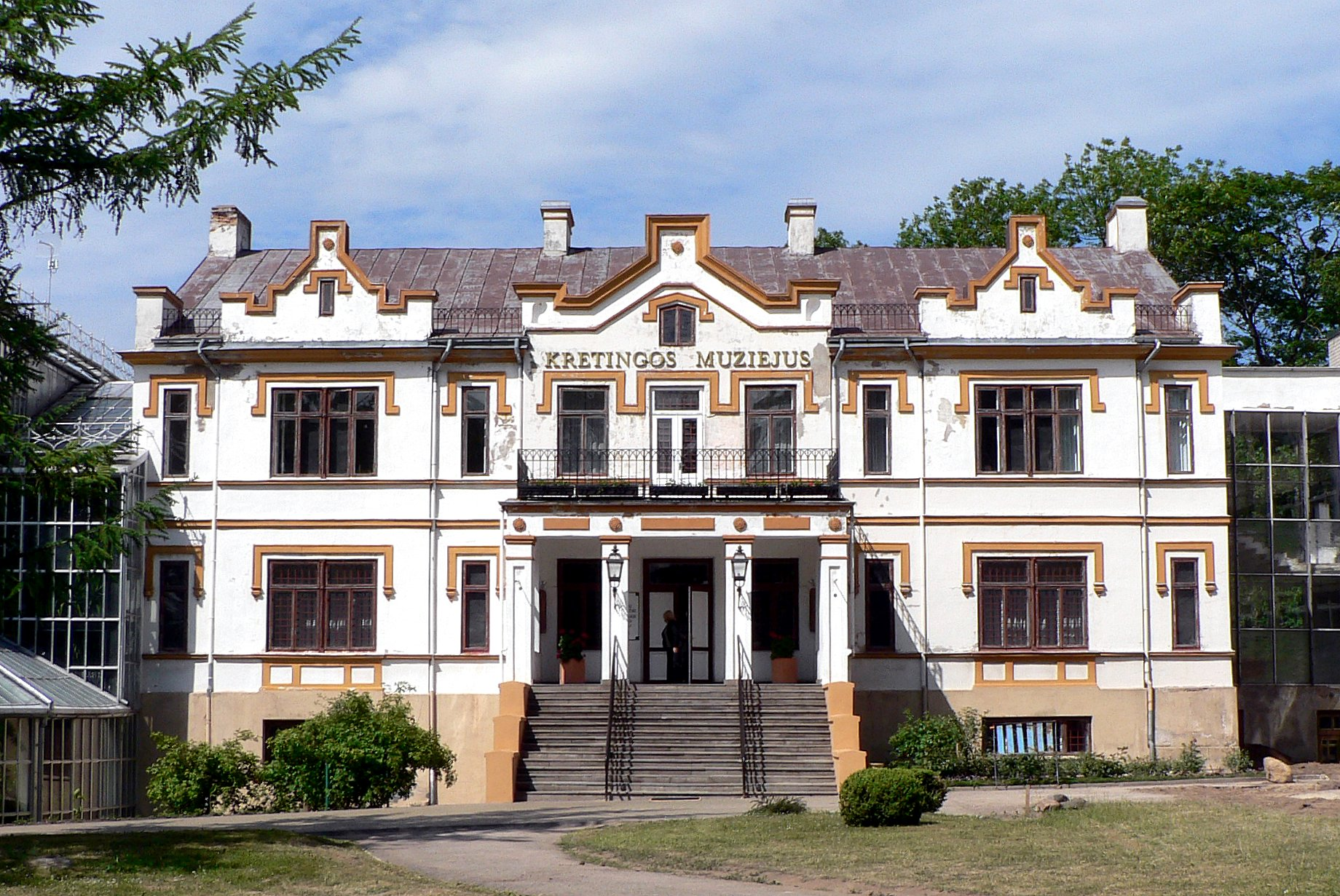
Tiškevičiai palace in Kretinga

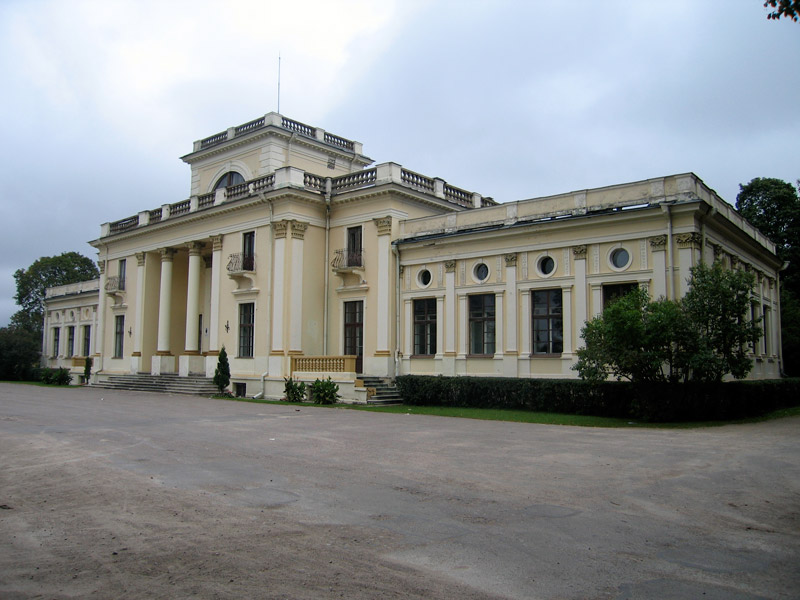
Tiškevičiai palace in Trakų Vokė

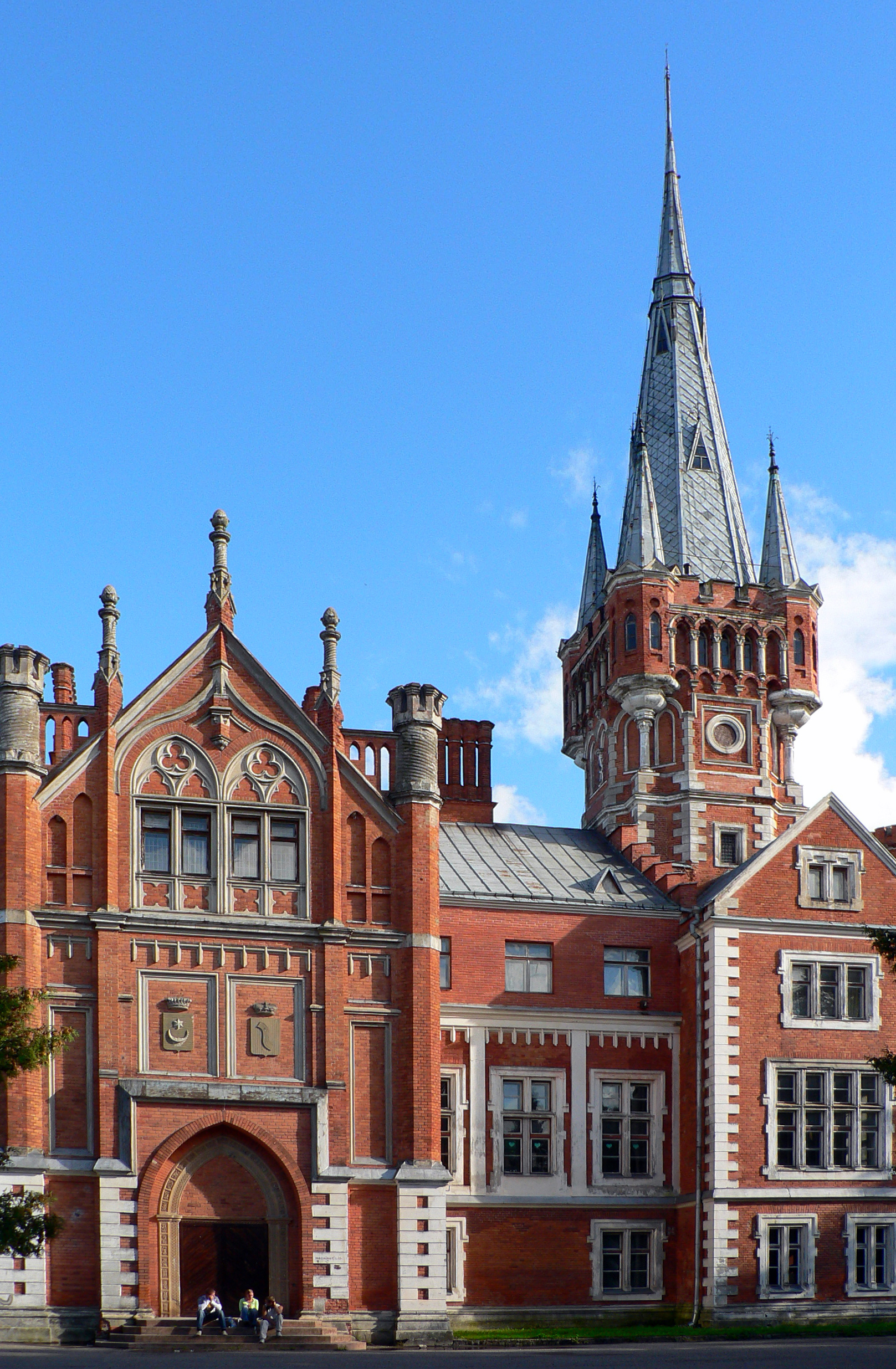
Tiškevičiai Palace in Lentvaris

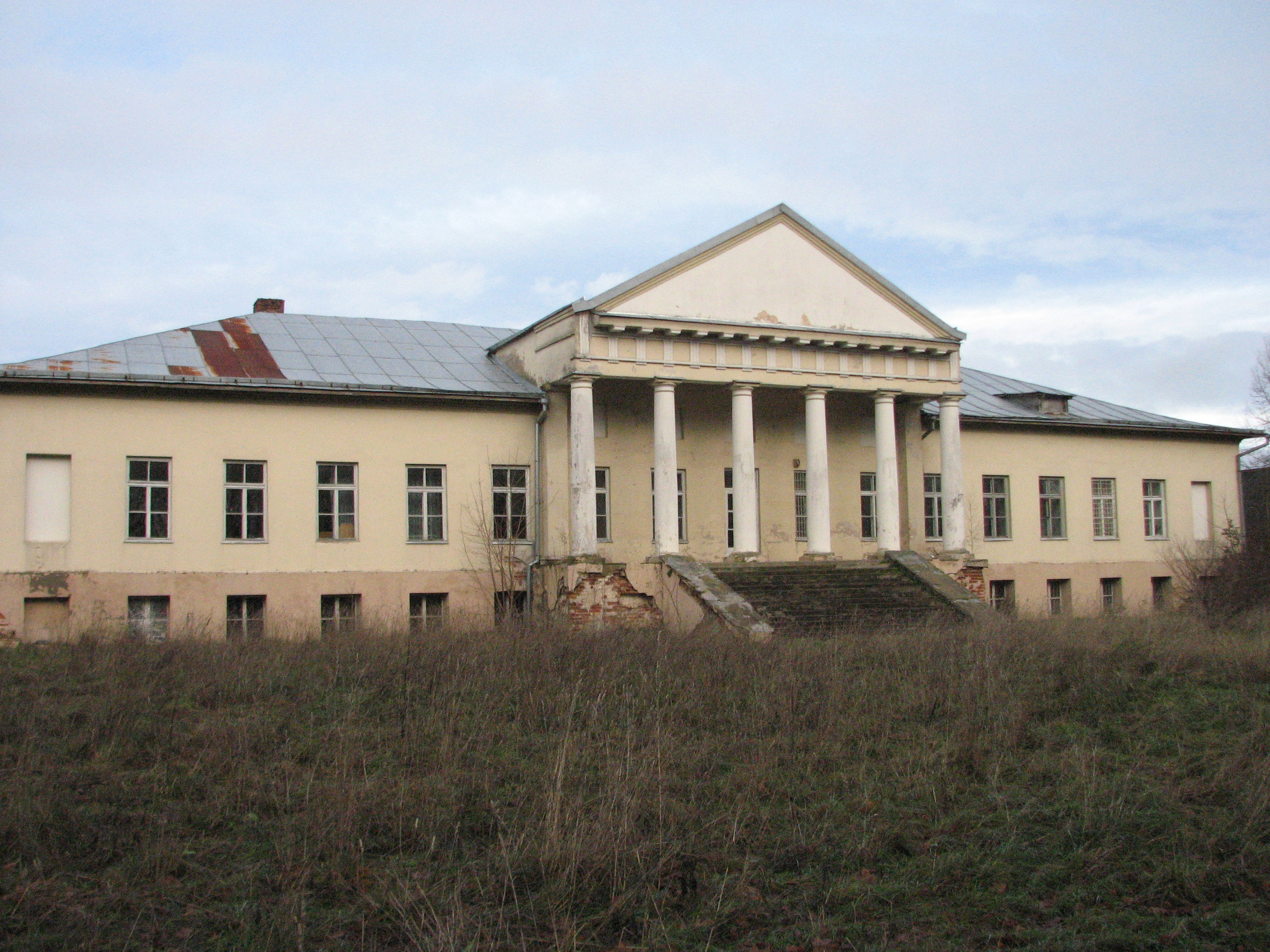
Arnionys Manor

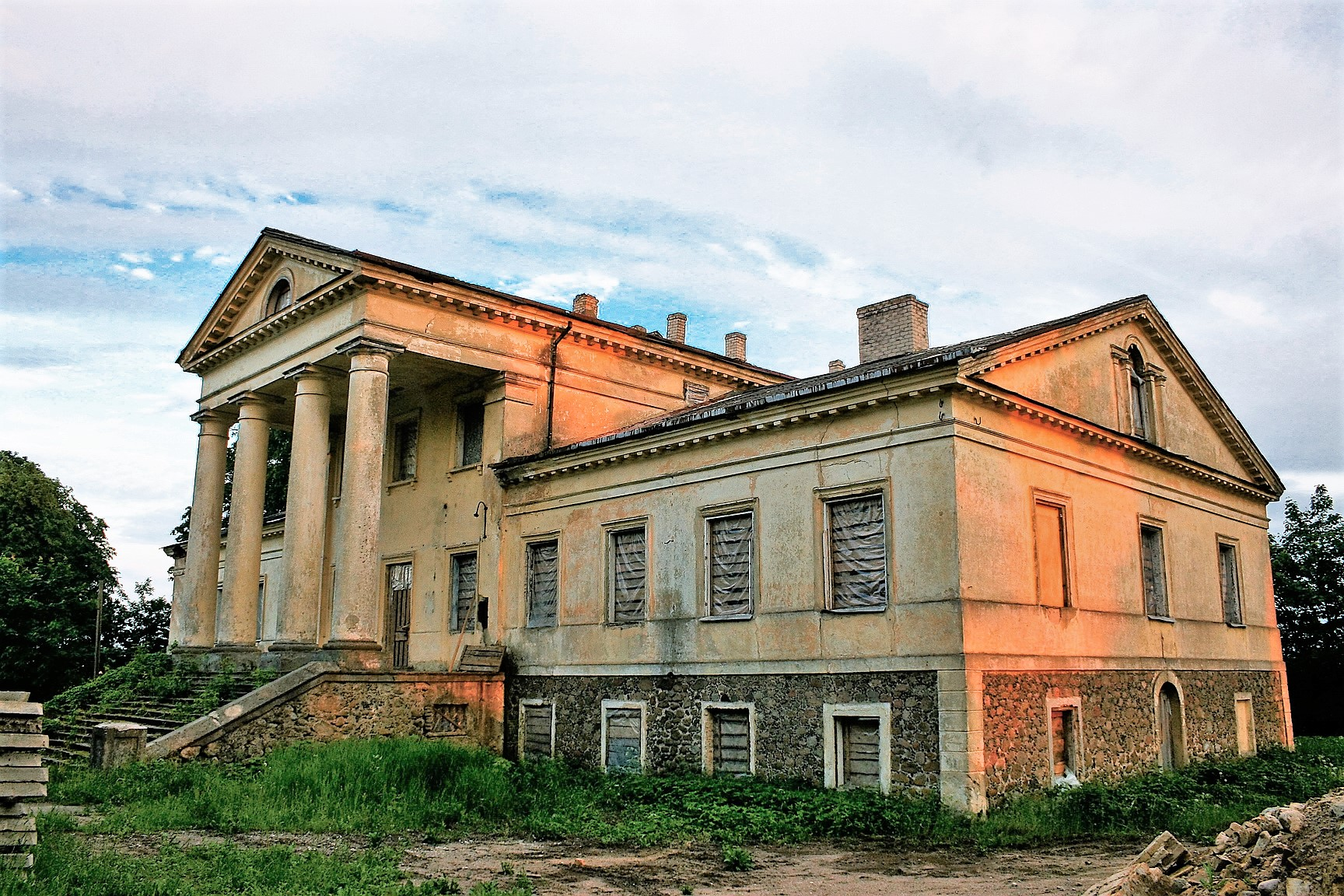
Nemėžis Manor

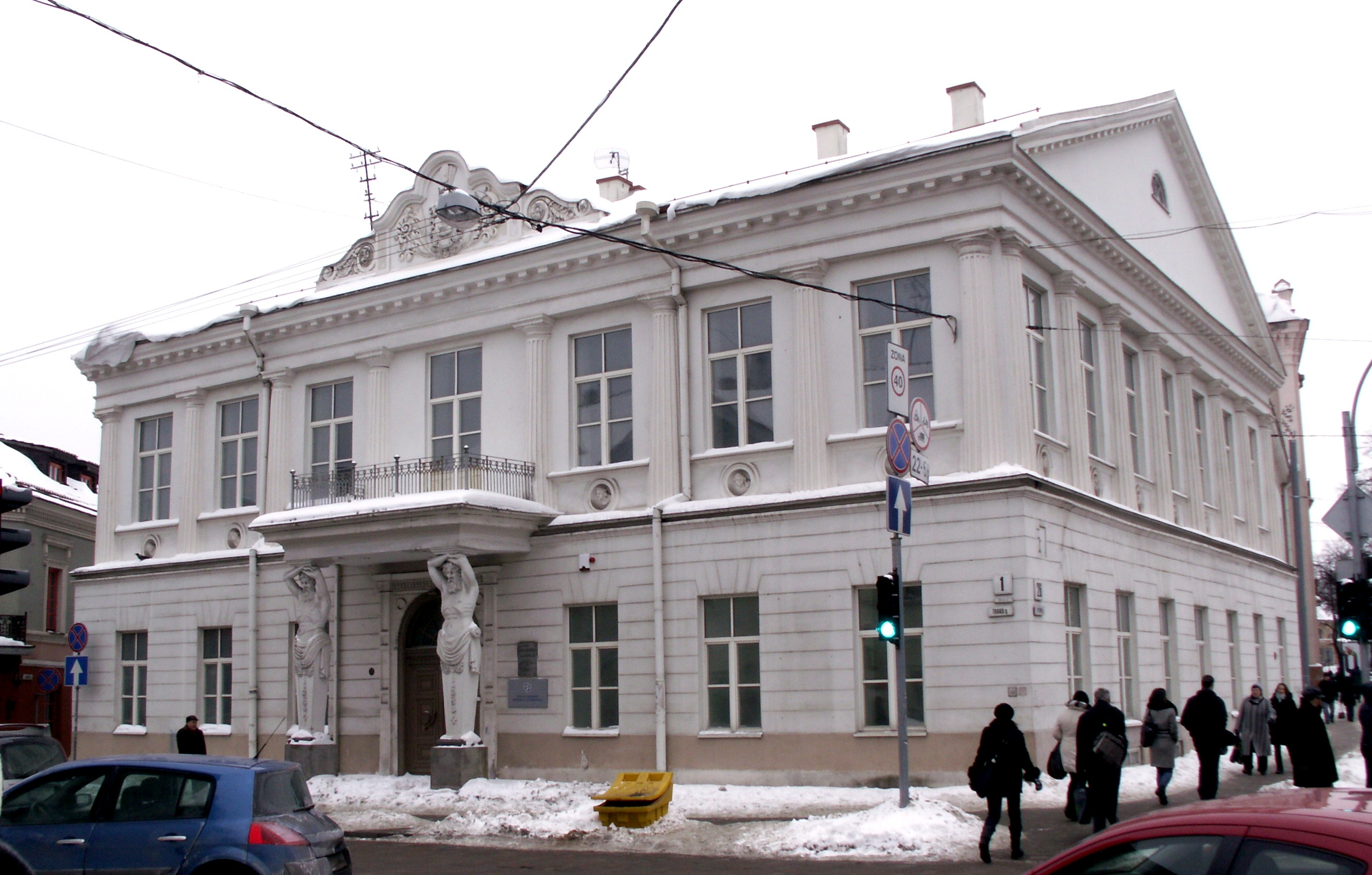
Tiškevičiai palace in Vilnius

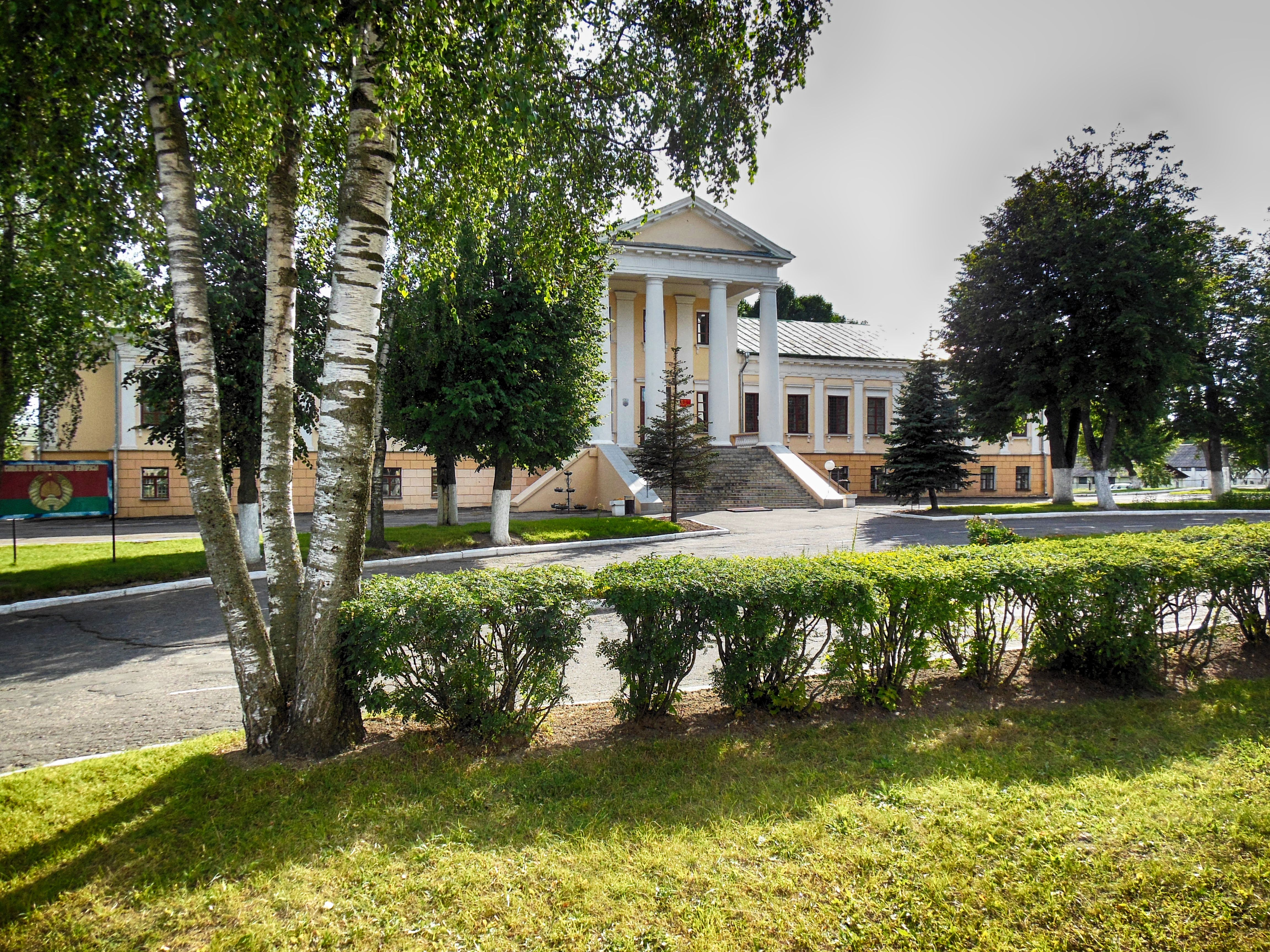
The Palace in Valozhyn

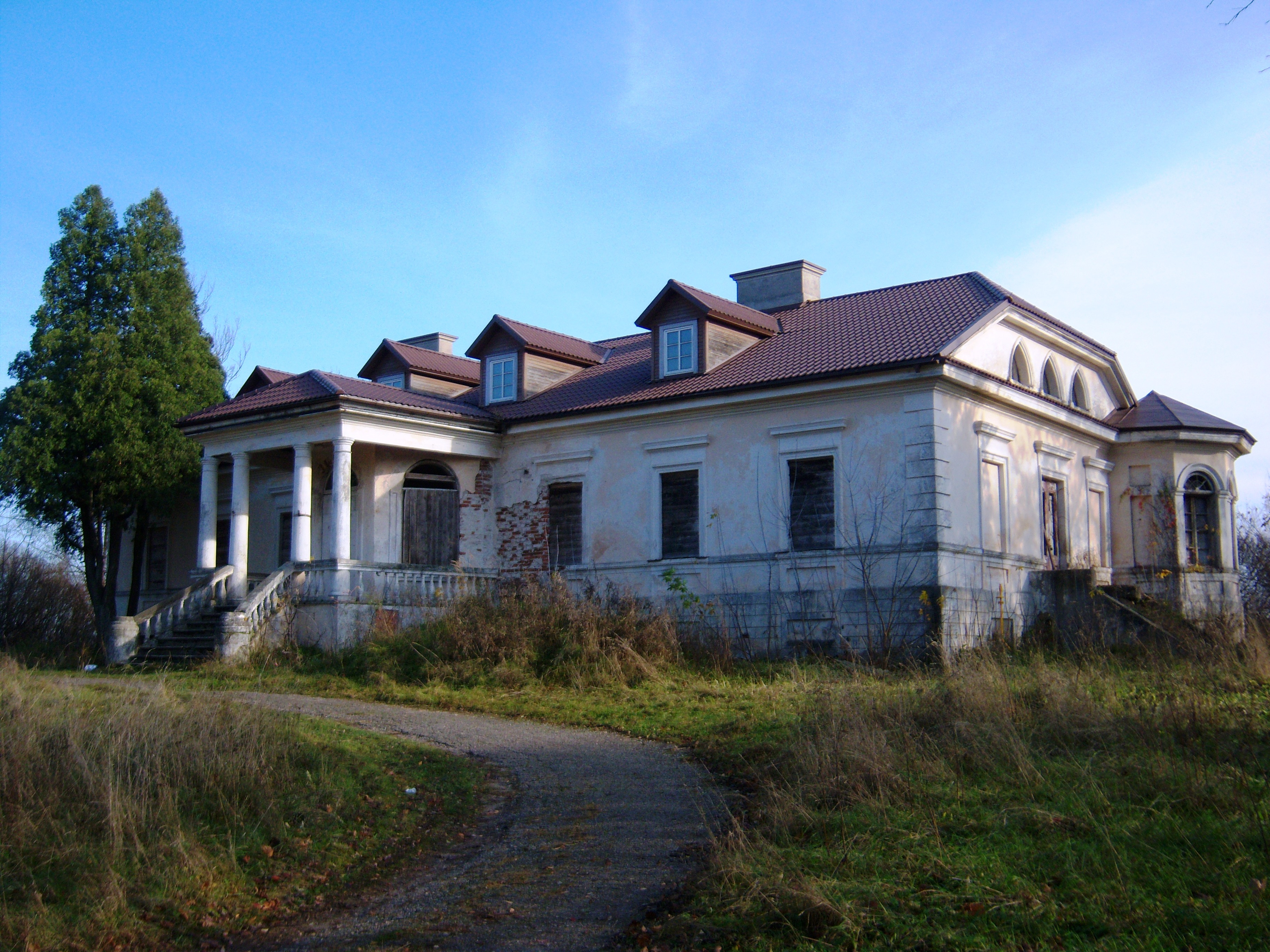
Leonpolis Manor

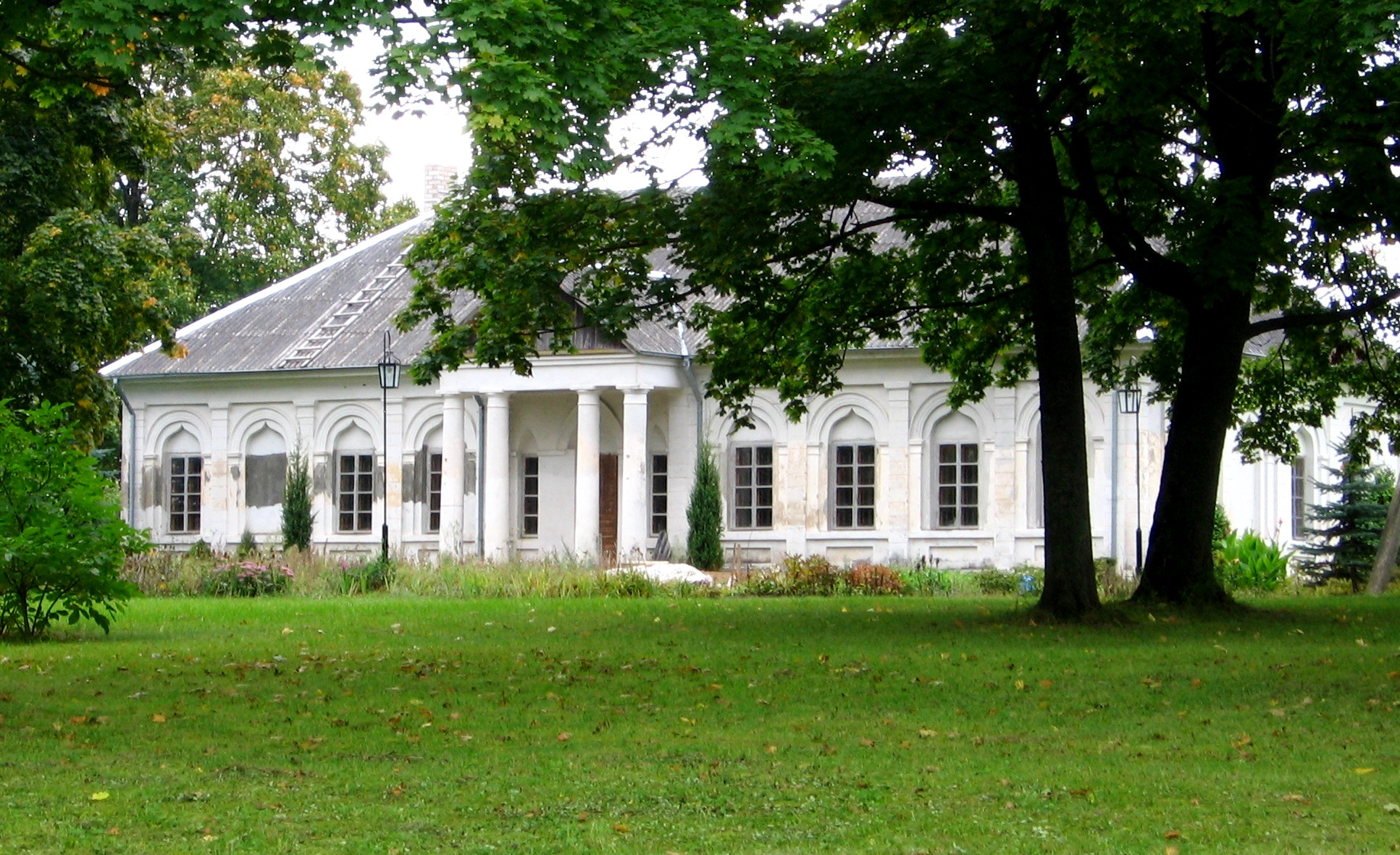
The mansion in Ziezmariai

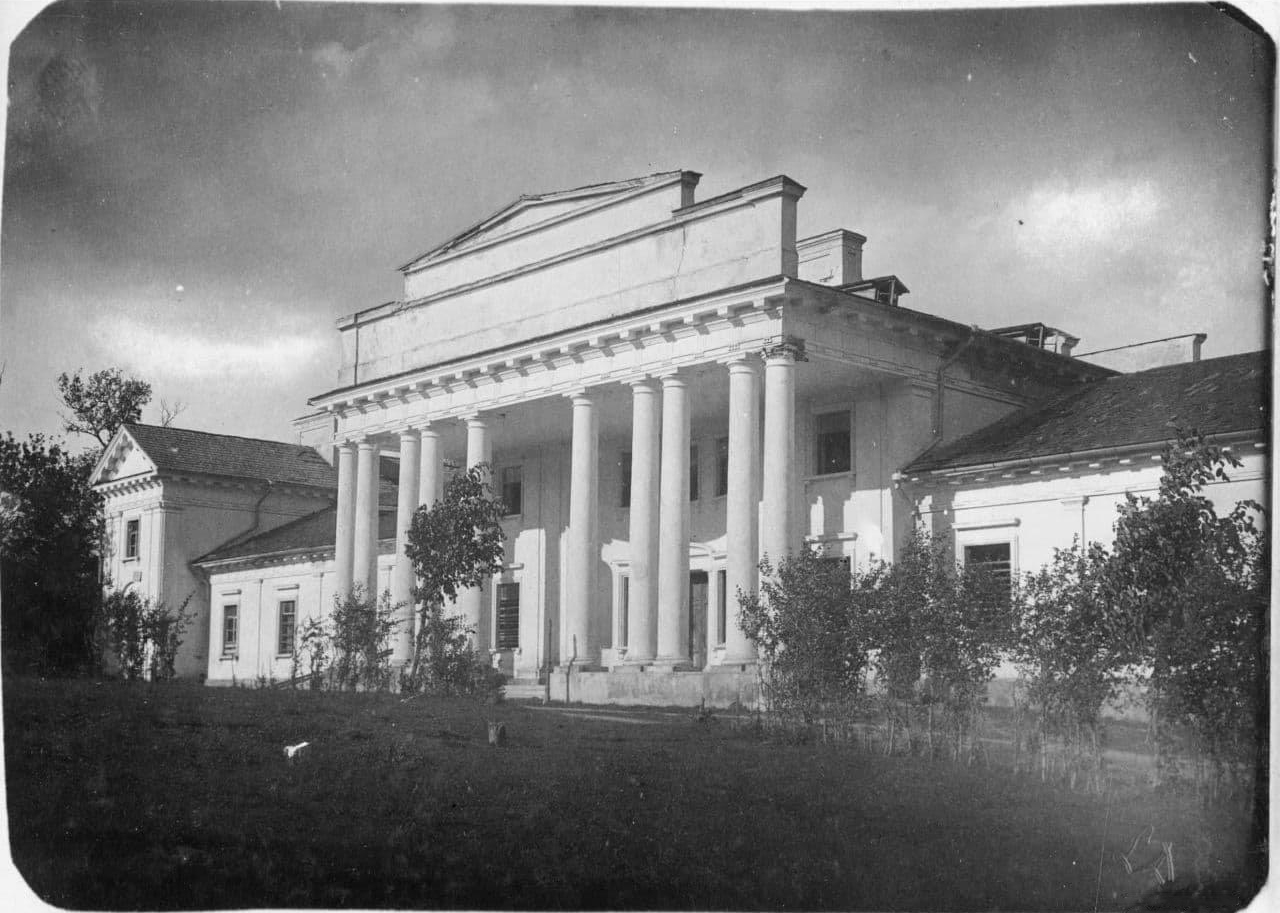
Tyszkiewicz palace in Łahojsk (in ruins)

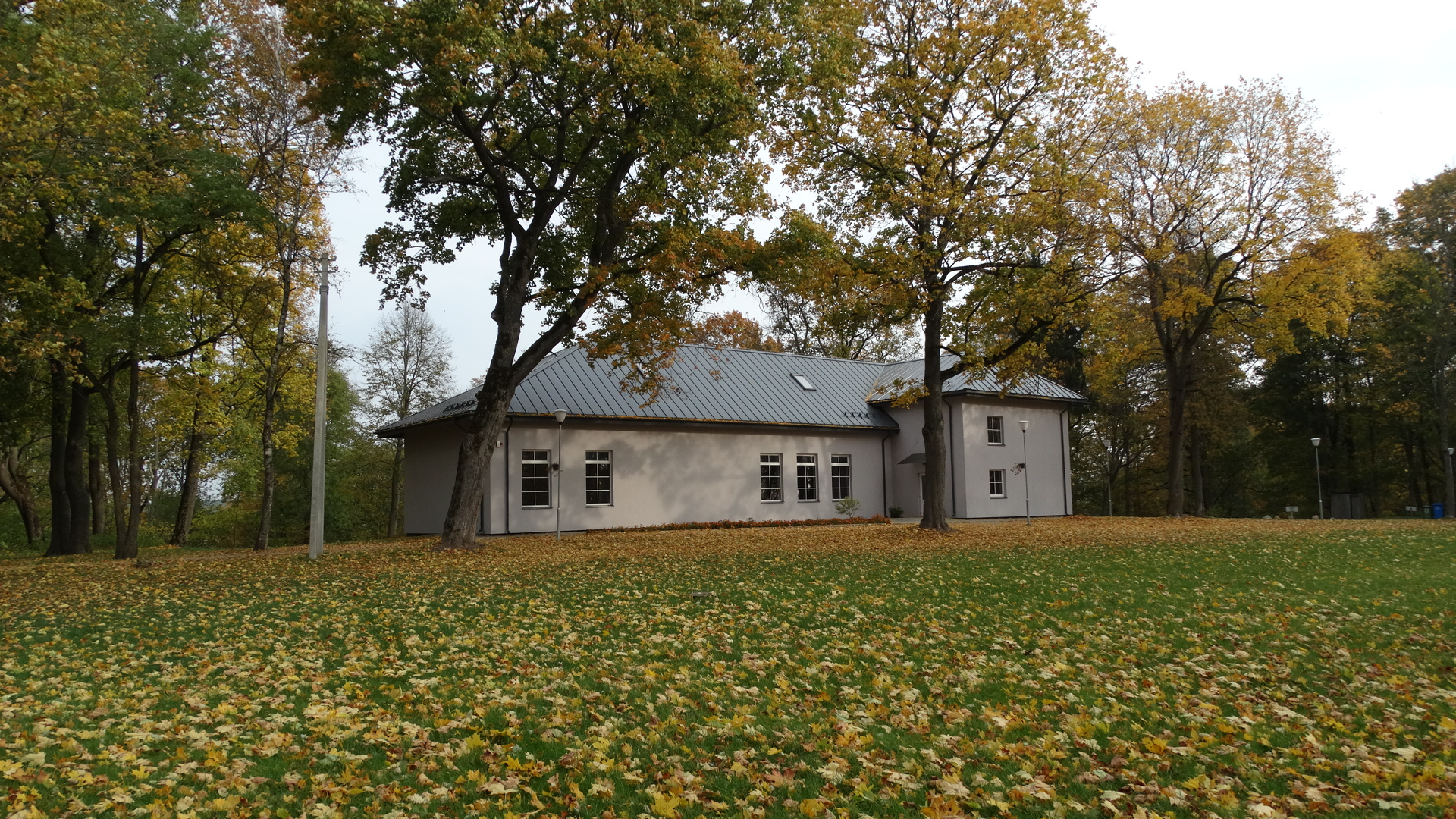
Former manorial buildings in Balbieriškis, (destroyed)

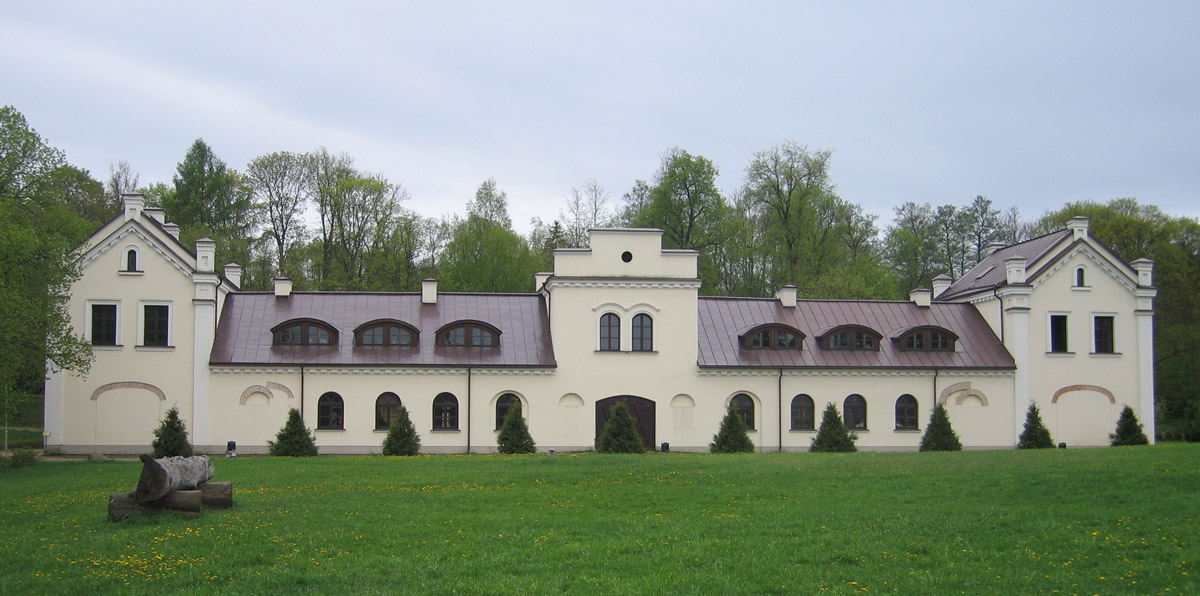
Stable buildings at the former Kairėnai Manor, Vilnius.

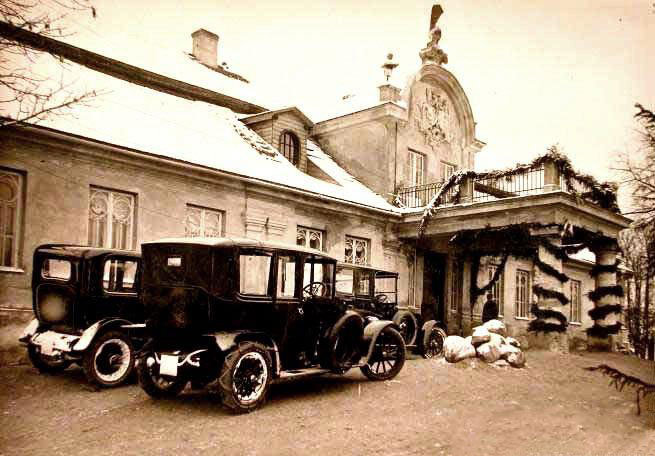
The palace in Dunilavichy (destroyed)
