= Tiškevičiai Palace, Palanga =

Palace in Lithuania

Tiškevičiai Palace
- Tiškevičių rūmai (Lithuanian)
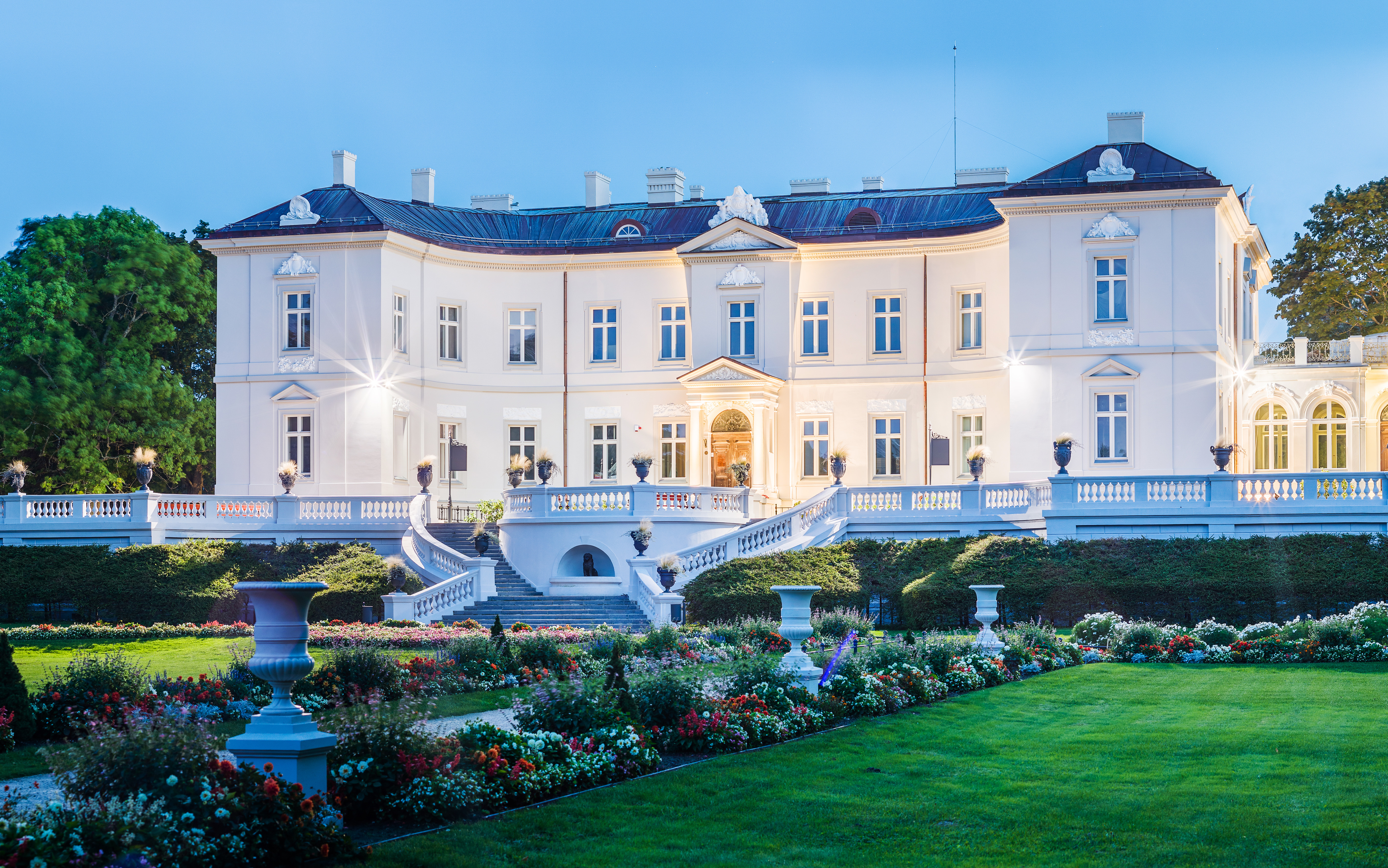
- Tiškevičiai Palace main façade

- Location within Lithuania
- Interactive map of Tiškevičiai Palace
- 55°54′25″N 21°03′21″E
- Location: Palanga, Lithuania

History
- Built: 1897
- Built for: Feliks Tyszkiewicz
- Original use: Palace

Site notes
- Architect: Franz Heinrich Schwechten
- Architectural styles: neo-Renaissance with Neoclassical and Baroque Revival elements
- Restored: 1957
- Restored by: Alfredas Brusokas
- Current use: Museum
- Owner: Palanga Amber Museum
- Website: www.pgm.lt

Cultural Monuments of Lithuania
- Type: National
- Designated: 13 February 2008
- Reference no.: 849

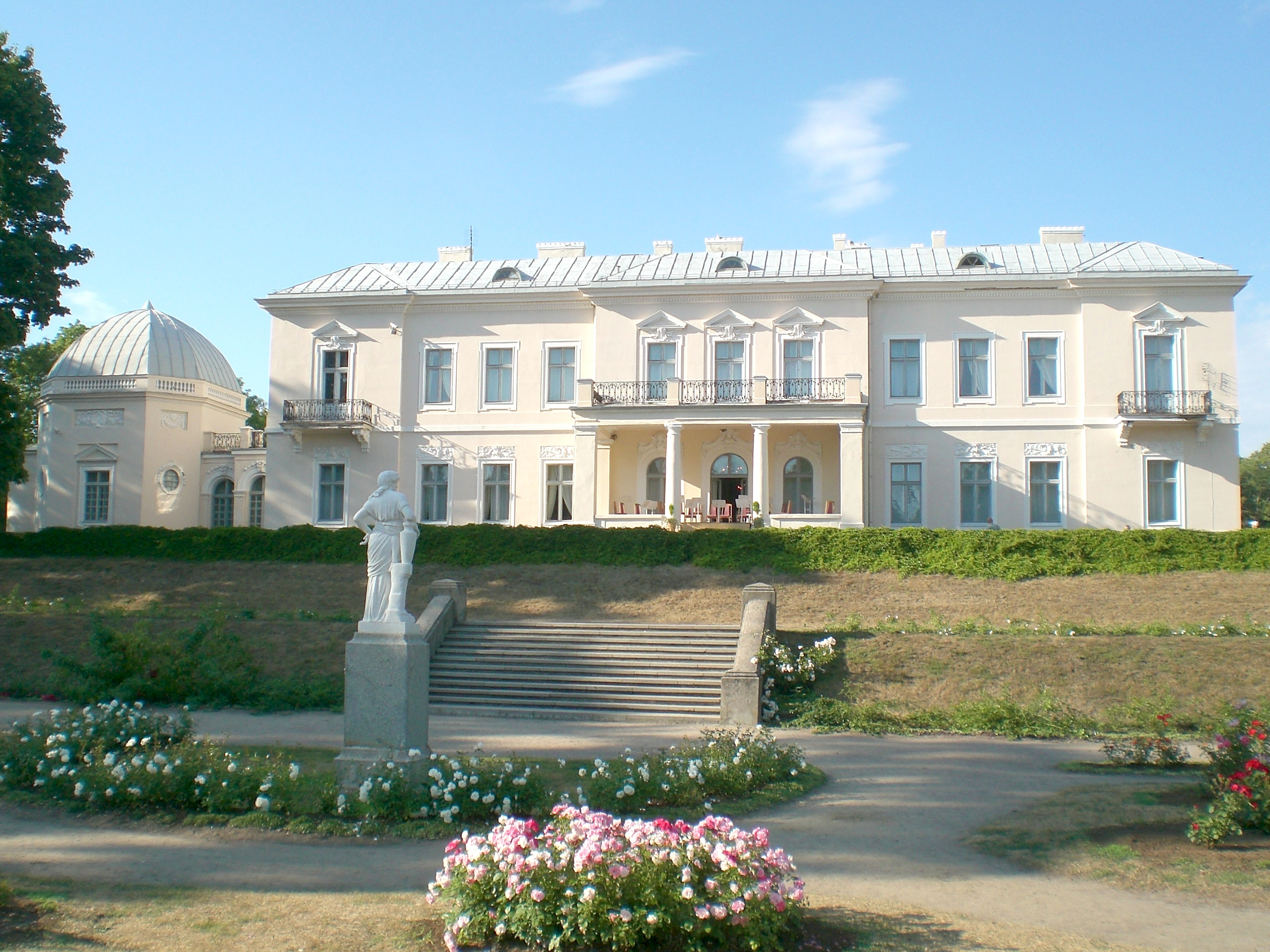
The southern façade and the rose garden (2006)

The Tiškevičiai Palace (Lithuanian: Tiškevičių rūmai; Polish: pałac Tyszkiewiczów) is a Neo-Renaissance style building in Palanga, Lithuania, built for the Tyszkiewicz family. The construction was started in 1893 and finished in 1897. The palace is surrounded by a park with ponds, fountains, and collections of rare plants. Since 1963 the palace has housed the Palanga Amber Museum and is surrounded by the Palanga Botanical Garden.

== History ==
Tyszkiewicz family member, Feliks Tyszkiewicz, contacted famous German architect Franz Heinrich Schwechten to construct a new palace; their old estate was a wooden manor on the banks of Rąžė River. The first stage of construction lasted until 1897, consisting of the terrace and main residence building. The two-story building had regular form with an arched terrace, decorated with sculptures from France. Although mainly Italian neo-Renaissance in style, it also has Neoclassical and Baroque Revival elements. Because in 1907 his wife, Antonina, delivered a healthy baby boy (Stanisław) after a worrisome pregnancy, Feliks commissioned a sculpture of the blessing Jesus for the front of the palace. While the creator of this sculpture is unclear, there is evidence it was made by Danish artist Bertel Thorvaldsen or his apprentice. In 1948 the religious sculpture was torn down under the instructions by the Lithuanian communist authorities. It was reconstructed based on surviving photographs in 1993. Almost a decade after the construction of the palace, the owners started to construct a chapel near by, also designed by Schwechten.

The palace gardens were designed by Édouard François André, French horticulturalist and landscape architect, and his son. André started work on gardens in 1895, taking three years to complete the work. In preparing the land for the gardens, old trees were cut down and new species were brought in. Some locals refused to cut down trees, as they thought they were sacred.

In 1916, an attempt at palace expansion was started, with Heinrich Schwechten being requested to prepare designs for expanding the upper floors and veranda, but these projects were never completed. During World War I, the palace was damaged in German bombardment. After World War II, the palace was nationalized and suffered from neglect. In 1957, palace renovations were conducted by Alfredas Brusokas, with the building serving for the Lithuanian Art Union. In the 1960s, the palace and surrounding gardens received attention form architect Kazys Šešelgis, who with associates started preparing plans to renovate the palace and surrounding gardens. In 1963, it officially became the Amber Museum.

Countess Antonina, her son, Stanisław, his wife Wanda, and their daughter, Renia were forced to flee from their Palanga home during World War II. When it became clear that they could never safely return, they accepted resettlement in Canada. Count Stanisław bequeathed his share of the family estate to his wife Wanda Tyszkiewicz. The other heir of the Tyszkiewicz family, count Alfred Tyszkiewicz (1913–2008), Stanisław's younger brother, was also forced to leave Lithuania during the Second World War, he donated his share of the palace to the city of Palanga. On May 22, 1997, he was honored with the title of Honorary Citizen of Palanga.

== Amber Museum ==
The museum's collection of amber comprises about 28,000 pieces, of which about 15,000 contain inclusions of insects, spiders, or plants. About 4,500 pieces of amber are exhibited; many of these are items of artwork and jewelry. The museum holds the third largest amber specimen in Europe, the "Sun Stone", weighing over 3.5 kilograms, which has been stolen twice. The cultural and artistic exhibits of museum currently include a 15th-century ring, a 16th-century cross, and amber jewelry from the past four centuries, as well as a number of modern decorations.

== See also ==
- Lithuanian Art Museum

== Gallery ==
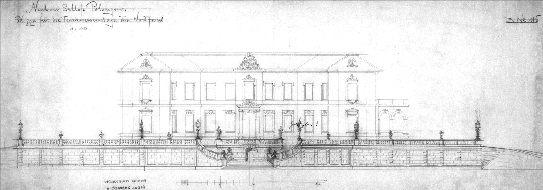
The design of the northern façade

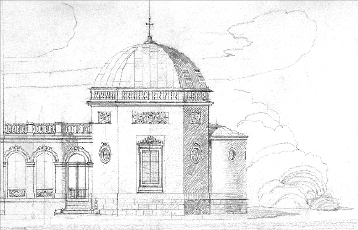
The design of the palace's chapel

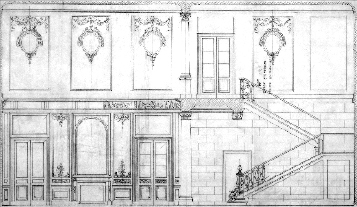
Palace hall project

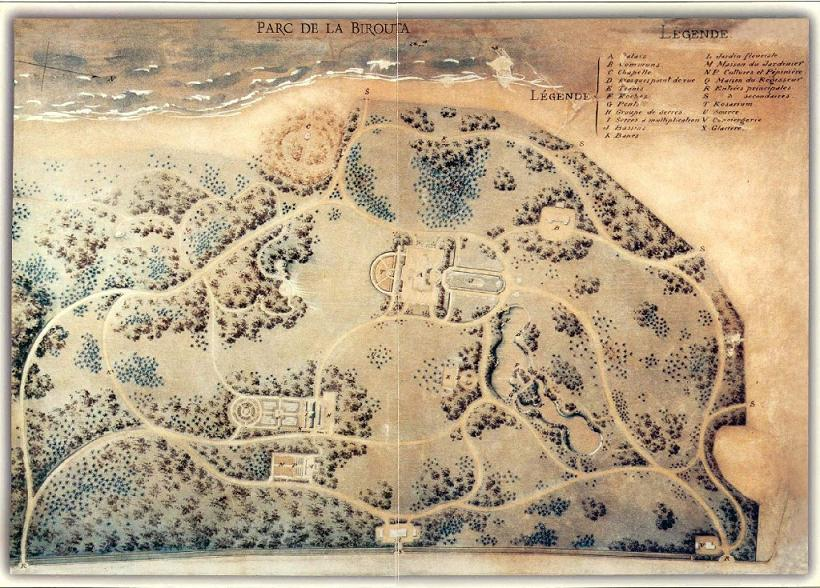
Plan of the gardens

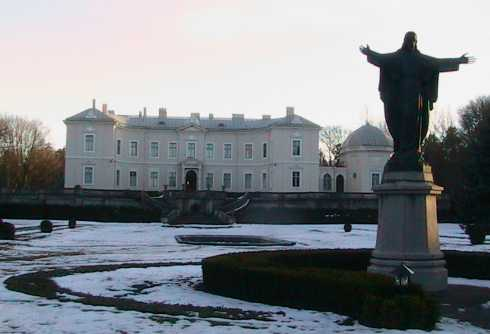
Blessing Jesus statue

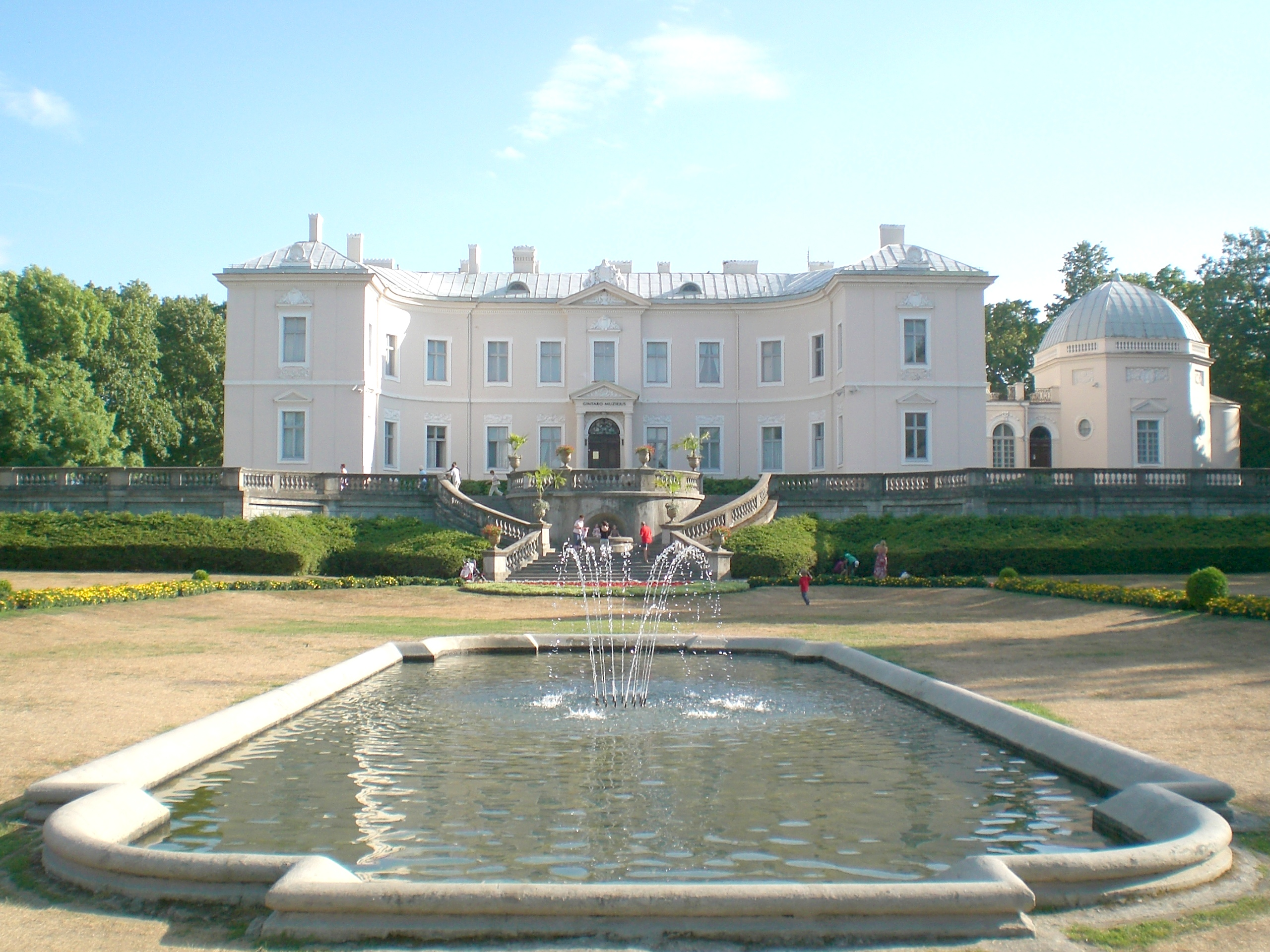
Fountain in summer

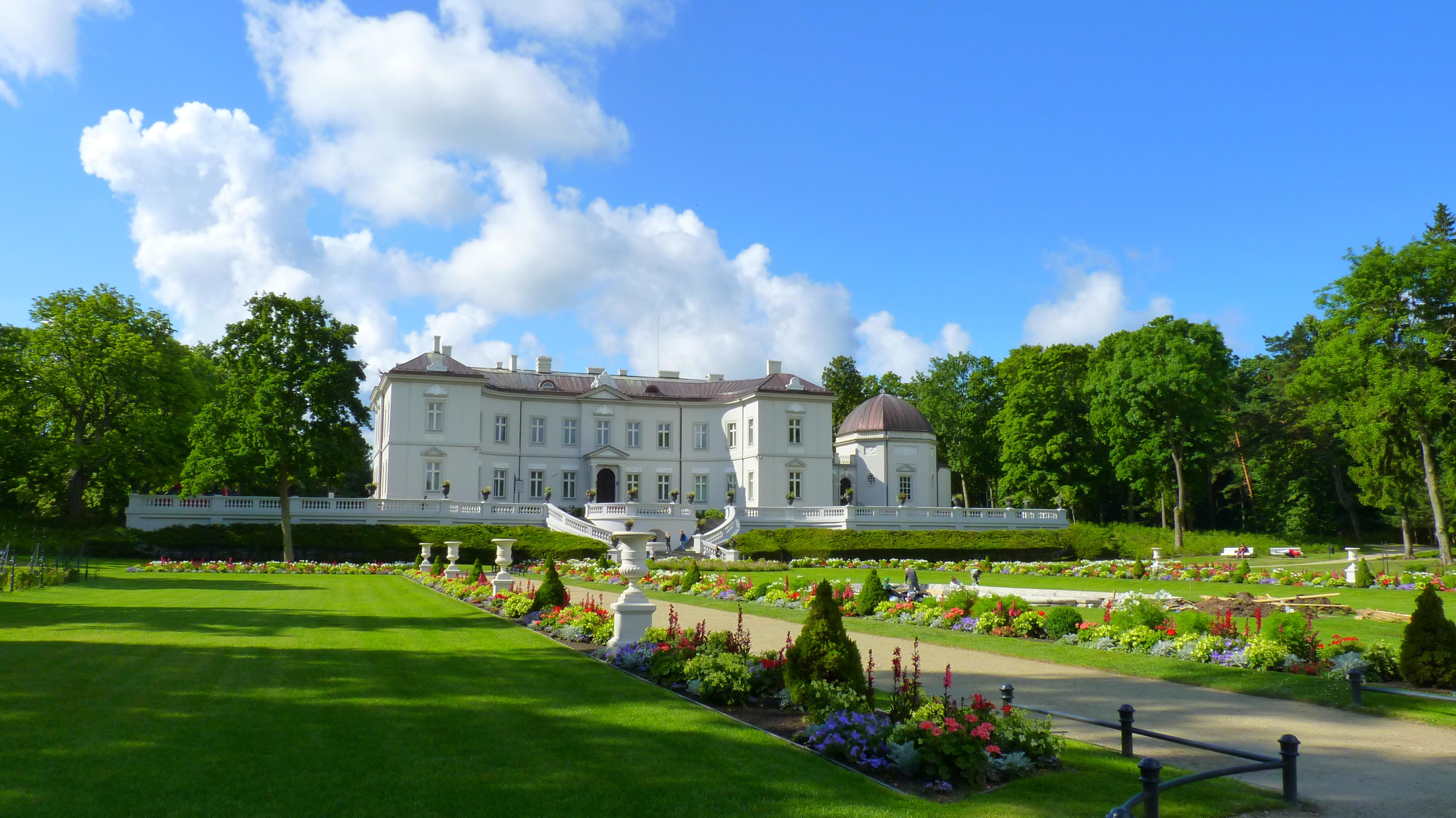
Flowers garden in front of the palace

== Bibliography ==
- Siedlecka, Jadwiga (1998). Połąga i okolice (in Polish). Warszawa: Agart. ISBN 83-86095-65-2.
