= Michał Tyszkiewicz (Egyptologist) =

Polish antiquarian and Egyptologist

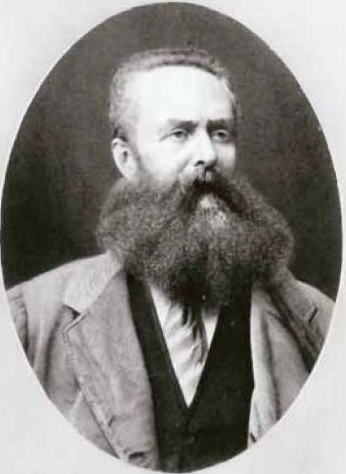
Michał Tyszkiewicz (c. 1850)

Count Michał Tyszkiewicz (4 December 1828, in Valozhyn – 18 November 1897, in Rome) was a Polish–Lithuanian nobleman, collector of antiquities and Egyptologist. He was a member of the Łohojsk branch of the Tyszkiewicz family.

He was born in Valozhyn to Józef Tyszkiewicz and Anna, née Zabiełło. He had three younger brothers: Jan Witold Emanuel, Władysław, and Józef. In 1849, he married Maria Radziwiłł in Berdychiv, the daughter of Mikołaj Radziwiłł and Wiktoria Emilia, née Narbutt. They had two sons, Józef and Jan Antoni, and three daughters, Jadwiga, Wiktoria Maria, and Wanda.

He first excavated at Luxor in 1861–1862 and revisited Egypt in 1867–1868, building up a collection during his travels. It is now split between different locations in Lithuania, Paris, London, Copenhagen, Berlin, Boston, Rome, and the Tyszkiewicz Palace at Lahojsk, Belarus. A small part of it remains in Poland in the National Museum in Warsaw.

== Writings ==
- Diary of a Journey to Egypt and Nubia, Paris 1863.
- Memories of an old collector, translated into English by Mrs. Andrew Lang. Longmans, Green, London 1898.
