= Nemėžis Manor =

Coordinates: 54°38′16″N 25°22′12″E

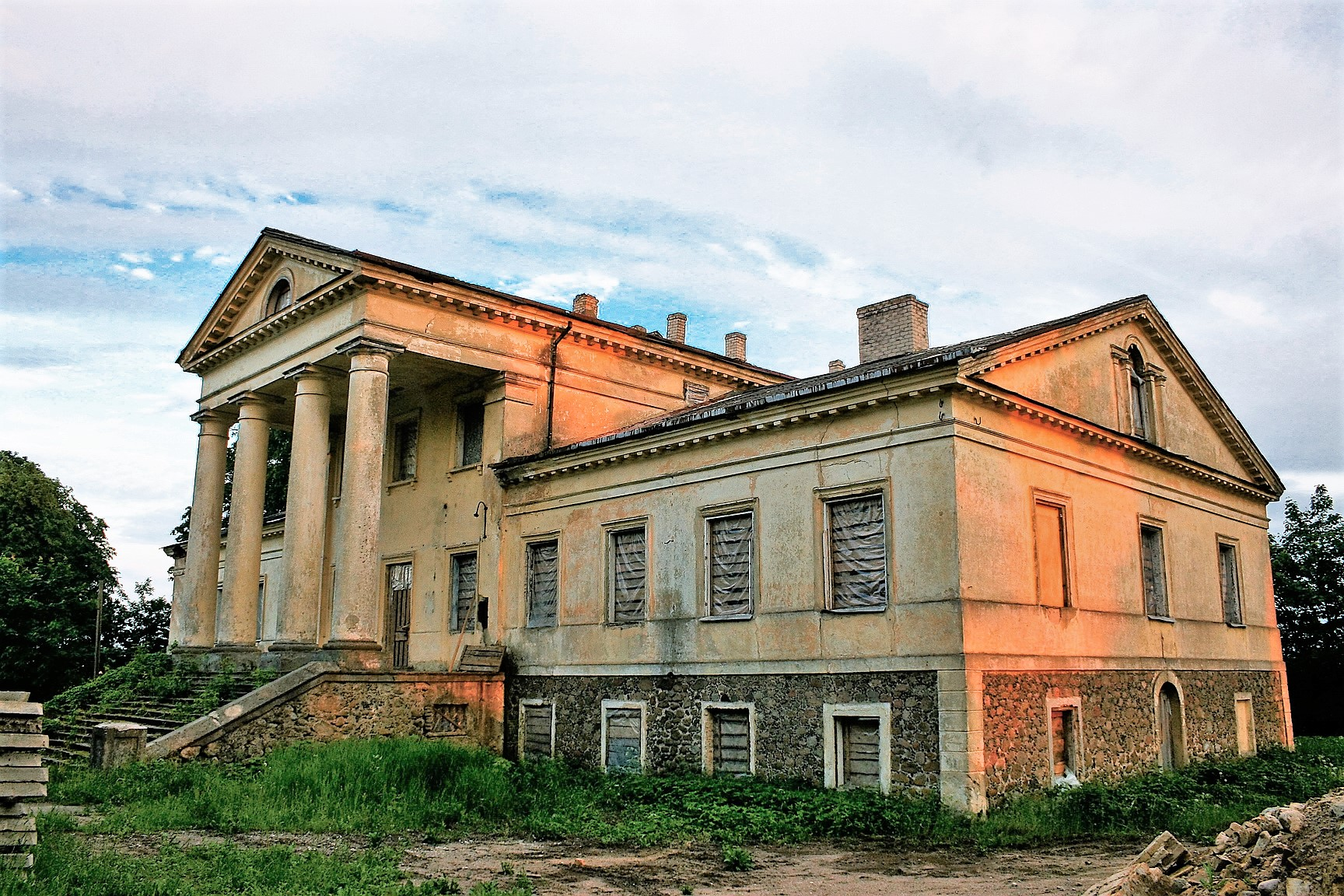
Nemėžis Manor (2007)

Nemėžis Manor is a former residential manor in Nemėžis, near Vilnius, Lithuania.

== History ==
Previously it was owned by Radziwiłł, Sapieha, Chodkiewicz and Ogiński noble families.
