= Hryhoriy Vasiura =

Soviet Axis collaborator and war criminal (1915–1987)

- Ukrainian: Григорій Микитович Васюра
- Vasiura during his trial (1986)
- Born: 15 February 1915; Chyhyryn, Kiev Governorate, Russian Empire
- Died: 2 October 1987 (aged 72); Pishchalauski Castle, Minsk, Byelorussian SSR, Soviet Union
- Spouse: Maria Vasiura
- Children: 4
- Military career
- Allegiance: USSR (1936–1941); Nazi Germany (1941–1945)
- Branch: Signal corps, artillery (1936–1941); Auxiliary police, grenadiers (1941–1945)
- Service years: 1936–1945
- Rank: Senior lieutenant (1936–1941); Untersturmführer (1941–1945)
- Units: 67th Rifle Division (1936–1941); Schutzmannschaft Battalion 118; 30th Waffen Grenadier Division of the SS
- Commands: Schutzmannschaft Battalion 118
- Conflicts: World War II; Liepāja defense; Khatyn massacre
- Awards: Deprived of all awards
- Other work: State farm economic director

Hryhoriy Mykytovych Vasiura (Ukrainian: Григорій Микитович Васюра, Russian: Григорий Никитич Васюра; 15 February 1915 – 2 October 1987) was a Soviet senior lieutenant in the Red Army who was captured during the Nazi invasion of the USSR in 1941 and subsequently volunteered for service in the Schutzmannschaft (the Nazi collaborationist auxiliary police) and the Waffen-SS. Vasiura's wartime activities were not fully revealed until the mid-1980s, when he was convicted as a war criminal by a Soviet military court and executed in 1987 for his role in the Khatyn massacre.

== Biography ==
=== Early life and Soviet military ===
Vasiura was born on 9 February 1915 (according to other data, in 1913) in the city of Chyhyryn (now Cherkasy Region, Ukraine). He worked as a school teacher before World War II. In 1936, he graduated from the Kiev Military School of Communications.

By the beginning of the Nazi invasion of the USSR in June 1941, Vasiura commanded a communication squad of the 67th Rifle Division (according to data of his war prisoner card, he served in the artillery forces). During the battle of Liepāja on June 28, he was wounded in the thigh and captured.

Vasiura was imprisoned in the camp Stalag III-A. While in captivity he agreed to collaborate with the Germans, and in February 1942 he was sent to the school of propagandists (first in Wustrau, later in Wutzetz) organized within the camp Stalag III-D under the authority of the Reich Ministry for the Occupied Eastern Territories.

=== Service in the ranks of punitive forces ===
After graduating from the school of propagandists in October 1942, Vasiura was sent to Kiev, where he joined the 118th Schutzmannschaft battalion composed of former Soviet soldiers and Ukrainian collaborators. Some sources state that along with other members of the unit he took part in executions of Jews in Babi Yar.

Vasiura quickly advanced in the service. From platoon commander, he was promoted to chief of staff over his predecessor in December 1942. The unit had a double leadership: German Major Erich Körner was in charge, while Vasiura supervised the battalion on a daily basis. That same month, the unit was transferred to the occupied Byelorussian SSR to conduct punitive operations against partisans. The battalion first arrived at Minsk, and then deployed to the town of Plyeshchanitsy.

From January 1943 to July 1944, Vasiura and his battalion conducted dozens of pacification actions – including operations Hornung, Draufgänger, Cottbus, Hermann and Wandsbeck – that were part of the "dead zone" policy of annihilating hundreds of Belarusian villages in order to remove the support base for the alleged partisans. 60 major and 80 smaller actions affected 627 villages across occupied Belarus.

=== Khatyn massacre ===
On the morning of 22 March 1943, three vehicles with the 118th battalion staff were ambushed by "Uncle Vasya's" partisan squad near the village of Khatyn. Partisans killed Hans Woellke, the hauptmann (captain) of the auxiliary police and commander of the first battalion's company, who was on his way to the Minsk airport. He was well known as the shot-put champion of the 1936 Olympics. Hitler knew him personally.

Woellke's death enraged the policemen, who suspected local peasants of helping the partisans. On the Plyeshchanitsy–Logoysk road they stopped 50 inhabitants of the village of Kozyri, and killed 26 of them. Soon the 118th battalion and SS-Sonderbataillon Dirlewanger surrounded the village of Khatyn. Following Körner's orders, the soldiers under Vasiura's direction forced the peasants into a barn which they set on fire. They shot everybody who tried to escape. In total, 149 people died (including 75 children).

=== Later war crimes in Belarus ===
Vasiura continued serving in the 118th battalion in Belarus.

On 13 May 1943 he commanded a unit in a battle against partisans for the village of Dalkovichi, and on 27 May, his battalion executed 78 people in the village of Osovi. Then, within the punitive operation Cottbus, the unit massacred residents of the village of Vileika and its suburbs. Afterwards they burned the villages of Makovie and Uborok, where nobody was left alive, and then executed 50 Jews in the village of Kaminska Sloboda.

Vasiura later transferred to the 76th Waffen Grenadier Regiment of the 30th Grenadier SS-Division, where he fought until the end of the war. Supposedly, his regiment was smashed in France, where some part of the 118th Schutzmannschaft battalion went over to French partisans.

Körner hid the civilian deaths, reporting to his superiors that the 118th battalion fought only against numerous partisan squads. This was due to the decree, issued on 18 November 1942, that forbade involving locals in criminal liability because many villages were "under partisans' oppression".

=== Post-war times ===
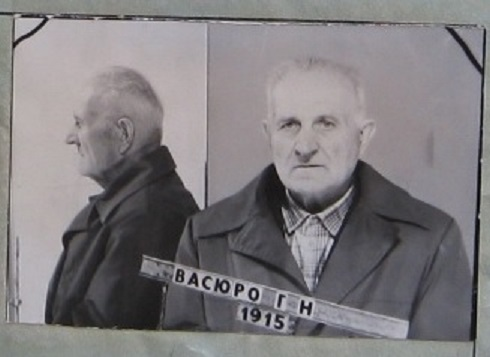
Vasiura during his criminal case, 1985

While at the Soviet filtration camp, Vasiura hid the fact of his service in the auxiliary police and SS. In 1952, the Kiev Military Tribunal sentenced him to 25 years imprisonment, but on 17 September 1955 he was amnestied in accordance with a decree issued by the Presidium of the Supreme Soviet. Usually, Vasiura explained his post-war imprisonment by the fact that he had previously been taken prisoner by the Germans, and obtained an official certificate confirming this.

Vasiura moved to the village Velyka Dymerka (Brovary District, Kyiv Region) and became the economic director of the Velikodymersky state farm. The farm was quite successful under his leadership. However, farm-workers sometimes complained about Vasiura's heavy-handed management as he would cruelly beat the employees. He built a big house, was encouraged several times for conscientious work, and received a membership of the Communist Party of the Soviet Union (CPSU). In 1984, he was awarded the medal Veteran of Labour. He married, and two of his daughters were school teachers.

Vasiura became an honorary cadet of the Kiev Military School of Communications. He would give patriotic speeches in front of cadets and pioneers, making reference to his fictional battle feats, pretending that he was a Red Army veteran.

=== Detention and trial ===
In 1985, Vasiura demanded the Order of the Patriotic War as a veteran. In the archives, employees found only the fact that he went missing in June 1941. Further searches in the archives forced them to review some results of the interrogation of Vasyl Meleshko, Vasiura's former fellow soldier, who was executed in 1975 for collaboration with the Nazis and participation in the burning of Khatyn. A criminal case was opened "due to the newly discovered circumstances". In November 1986, Vasiura was arrested and transferred to Minsk.

With almost no survivors of the Khatyn massacre, the 26 witnesses were former soldiers of the 118th Schutzmannschaft battalion, most of whom had already served their sentences in Soviet camps and prisons.

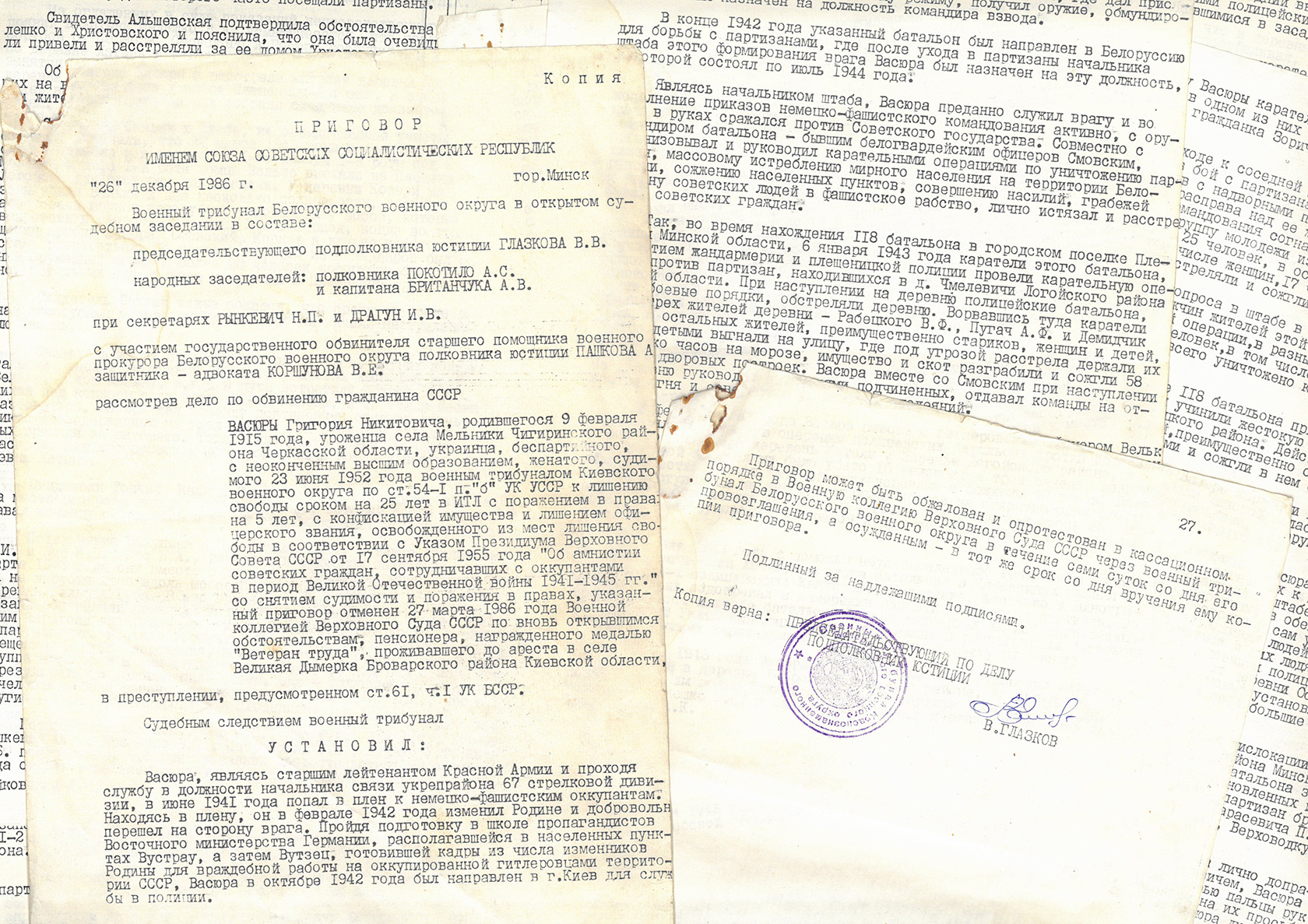
The death sentence to Vasiura handed down by the Tribunal of the Belorussian Military District on 26 December 1986.

Vasiura initially denied his guilt; he claimed that he did not participate in the punitive operation and did not kill any civilians. But the witnesses all testified that Vasiura gave them orders to kill the villagers. Transcripts of the court case totaled 14 volumes, and the investigators managed to reconstruct the events of 22 March 1943, with accuracy to the minute. Irrefutable evidence of his participation in these military crimes, particularly in the episode at Khatyn, was found.

When Vasiura realized that there was no point denying it, he confessed, shouting, "Yes, I burned your Khatyn!" On 26 December 1986 the Tribunal of the Belorussian Military District, headed by Judge Viktor Glazkov, sentenced Vasiura to death by shooting. He was executed by shooting at Pishchalauski Castle on 2 October 1987.

The trial was private; only two correspondents – of the newspaper Izvestiya and the agency BelTA – were assigned to report on it. They completed their articles but were later informed that the materials would not be published. Glazkov claimed that this happened due to the direct involvement of the general secretary of the Communist Party of Ukraine, Volodymyr Shcherbytsky, and the Communist Party of Byelorussia First Secretary Mikalai Sliunkov. Both were concerned that a public trial of a Ukrainian war criminal would undermine the official discourse of the brotherhood between Soviet peoples, especially among Belarusians and Ukrainians.

Vasiura was buried in a forest near Logoysk, in the same place where many of his victims lay. There are papers in the archives which contain the coordinates of the place where his body was buried. He has no grave marker.

The Belarusian government declassified the records of the trial in March 2008.

== See also ==
- Come and See
- Generalplan Ost
- Belarusian Auxiliary Police
- Kaminski Brigade
- Oskar Dirlewanger
- Volodymyr Katriuk
- Antonina Makarova
- Feodor Fedorenko
- John Demjanjuk

== Bibliography ==
- Oushakine, Serguei Alex (2013). "Postcolonial Estrangements: Claiming a Space between Stalin and Hitler". Rites of Place: Public Commemoration in Russia and Eastern Europe.
- Rudling, Per Anders (2011). "Terror and Local Collaboration in Occupied Belarus: The Case of Schutzmannschaft Battalion 118. Part I: Background". Historical Yearbook. Bucharest: Romanian Academy "Nicolae Iorga" Historical Institute. VIII: 195–214.
- Rudling, Per Anders (2012). "The Khatyn Massacre in Belorussia: A Historical Controversy Revisited" (PDF). Holocaust and Genocide Studies. 26 (1): 29–58.
- Laputska, Valeria (2016). " World War II Criminals in Belarusian Internet Mass-Media: The Cases of Anthony Sawoniuk and Vladimir Katriuk" (PDF). The Journal of Belarusian Studies.
- Singh, Shantanu (2017). "Khatyn Massacre: One of The Worst Nazi Atrocities". Catharsis Magazine.
