= Vasyl Meleshko =

Ukrainian war criminal

- Born: 26 April 1917; Nyzhni Sirohozy, Taurida, Russian Empire
- Died: 1975 (aged 57–58); Pishchalauski Castle, Minsk, Byelorussian SSR, Soviet Union
- Spouse: Nikol Meleshko
- Military career
- Allegiance: Soviet Union (1938–1941); Nazi Germany (1941–1944); France (1944–1945)
- Branch: (Soviet Union) Infantry (Nazi Germany) Schutzmannschaft, grenadiers (Free France) Partisans (France) Legionaries
- Service years: 1938–1945
- Rank: (Soviet Union) Junior lieutenant (Nazi Germany) Untersturmführer (Free France) Lieutenant (France) ?
- Nickname: Executioner of Khatyn
- Units: (Soviet Union) 67th Rifle Division (Nazi Germany) Schutzmannschaft Battalion 118; 30th Waffen Grenadier Division of the SS (Free France) 2nd Ukrainian Taras Shevchenko Battalion (France) 13th Demi-Brigade of Foreign Legion
- Commands: (Soviet Union) Machine-gun Platoon (Nazi Germany) Police Platoon (Free France) ? (France) ?
- Conflicts: World War II; Molotov Line; Khatyn massacre
- Awards: deprived of all awards
- Other work: agronomist

Vasyl Andriyovych Meleshko (Ukrainian: Василь Андрійович Мелешко, 26 April 1917 – 1975) was a Ukrainian war criminal who participated in the Khatyn massacre.

== Biography ==
=== Pre-war years ===
Vasyl Meleshko was born in the settlement of Nyzhni Sirohozy, Taurida (now known as the Kherson Region, Ukraine) in 1917. He received a secondary school education after which he graduated from an agricultural technical school, specializing in agronomy. Beginning in 1938 he served in the Red Army. In 1940, he graduated from a course at the Kiev Infantry School, where he attained the rank of lieutenant. He was a member of the Komsomol from 1939 on.

=== Prisoner of war ===
By the beginning of the German invasion of the USSR, he served in the 140th separate machine-gun battalion, where he was a commander of a machine-gun platoon. The battalion was based at the Strumyliv Fortified District on the so-called Molotov Line. On the very first day of the war Meleshko was taken prisoner near the village of Parkhach, when his battalion was surrounded after the enemy's massive attacks on the Red Army positions. He was excluded from army lists as a missing person in September 1941.

Meleshko was sent to a prisoners of war concentration camp at Hammelburg (Oflag-XIII D). He agreed to collaborate with the Germans.

In the autumn of 1942, after receiving special training in Germany, Meleshko was transferred to Kiev for service in the occupation units. He joined the 118th Schutzmannschaft Battalion composed of former Soviet soldiers and Bukovinians. Some sources state that along with other members of the unit he took part in executions of Jews in Babi Yar.

Meleshko received the rank of Zugführer and became the commander of a platoon of the 118th battalion. Initially, the unit performed security functions at various sites in Kiev of secondary importance.

=== Service in the ranks of punitive forces ===
In December 1942, the 118th Battalion was transferred to the occupied Byelorussian SSR to conduct punitive operations against partisans. First the battalion went to Minsk, and then it went to the town of Pleshchenitsy.

From January 1943 to July 1944, Meleshko and his platoon took part in dozens of pacification actions — including the operations Hornung, Draufgänger, Cottbus, Hermann and Wandsbeck — that were part of the "dead zone" policy of annihilating hundreds of Belarusian villages in order to remove the support base for alleged partisans. 60 major and 80 smaller actions affected 627 villages across occupied Belarus.

The first victims of the 118th Battalion were the residents of the village of Chmelevichi, Logoysky district, Minsk region. On 6 January 1943, during the punitive operation in the village, 58 houses were looted and burned. Battalion forces threw half-dressed people out in a winter frost, and three of them were shot. Meleshko personally fired on the village with a rifle and gave orders to fire. In this and in a number of other operations, the battalion acted in conjunction with the SS-Sonderbataillon Dirlewanger, located in the district center of Logoisk. This unit was created in 1940 by SS-Obergruppenführer Gottlob Berger and Reichsführer-SS Heinrich Himmler in accordance with Hitler’s personal order. Berger later suggested that the suitable commander for the unit is his old comrade, the notorious Oskar Dirlewanger who had just joined the SS.

In February 1943, the battalion members, after a heavy fight with partisans, decided to vent anger at residents of the villages of Zarechie and Koteli. They killed 16 people and burned 40 houses.

In 25 April 1974, Hryhoriy Spivak, a private of the 118th Schutzmannschaft Battalion said "In general, the first company we had was the cruelest and most devoted to the Germans. Most, if not all of them, were nationalists from Western Ukraine. Specifically, Meleshko's platoon was the most “vanguard” one."

=== Khatyn massacre ===
On the morning of 22 March 1943, a column of several vehicles with the members of the 1st Company's platoons of 118th Battalion left Pleshchenitsy for Logoysk with task of supervising a group of construction unit repairing a damaged telephone line. While the work was still in progress, the convoy came under fire, being ambushed by "Uncle Vasya’s" partisan detachment. Meleshko was slightly wounded in the head. When trying to jump out of the car, Hans Woellke, the Hauptmann of the auxiliary police and commander of the battalion's first company, was killed. Woellke was well known as the shot-put champion of the 1936 Olympics. Hitler personally knew him and considered him one of his favorite athletes.

Shortly before the ambush, the company members on the road met 50 residents of the village of Kozyri who were cutting down trees in the forest. Furious at his wound and Woellke's death, Meleshko accused the lumberjacks of concealing partisans and ordered them to be escorted to Pleschenitsy. He then went to the headquarters to call for reinforcements. When the vehicles of the 118th Battalion, raised by the alarm, arrived, the lumberjacks started running away. The company forces opened fire on them. Meleshko himself shot them at close range with a medium-sized machine gun and finished off the wounded. 26 people were killed.

On 19 November 1973, Ostap Knap said,

When I arrived at the site of the shooting, there were really a lot of people lying on the road. The entire place was drenched in blood. ... I saw how Ivankiv was firing with a machine gun upon the people who were running for cover in the forest, and how Katriuk and Meleshko were shooting the people lying on the road. ... Meleshko and Pankiv were particularly cruel to the loggers—Meleshko because he had been wounded, and Pankiv because he wanted to avenge [the killing of a soldier] from his home region.

Shortly afterwards, the policemen from the 118th Battalion and the 1st company of SS-Sonderbatailllon Dirlewanger attacked and surrounded the village of Khatyn, where several partisans remained. They started shooting at the village. The platoon commander Meleshko even pushed away one of his subordinate machine gunners and began shooting himself. Troops from Dirlewanger's company used mortars and heavy guns to weaken the partisan's resistance.

After the resistance has been neutralized, they entered the village and plundered it. They drove all the residents into a barn, closed it, and set it on fire. Like other commanders, Meleshko was in the immediate vicinity of the barn, and along with others, he fired on the burning barn with an automatic rifle while people tried to escape from it. All the houses in the village of Khatyn were also burned. 149 civilians died.

=== Further activities during the war ===
In May 1943, Meleshko participated in the burning of another village. Residents of the village of Osovi, in the Dokshitsky district of the Vitebsk region, having learned about the battalion members’ approach, took shelter in the forest. The battalion forces found them, drove them into a barn on the outskirts, locked them up, set the barn on fire, and started firing on people who burned alive. 78 civilians were killed. During the operation "Cottbus" there was a massacre of residents of the town of Vileika and its environs. Then the battalion burned the villages of Makovye and Uborok, killing all the inhabitants. 50 Jews were shot in the village of Kaminskaya Sloboda.

During the offensive of the Red Army in 1944, the 118th Battalion retreated along with the occupation forces to East Prussia. Together with the 115th Schutzmannschaft Battalion, it was included in the 30th Waffen Grenadier Division of the SS and sent to the west to fight French partisans.

Seeing the inevitability of the Third Reich's defeat, the division's soldiers decided to join the partisans. Meleshko became one of the initiators of that defection. Former battalion members formed the 2nd Ukrainian Taras Shevchenko Battalion, which was later included in the French Foreign Legion. While a part of this formation, Vasyl Meleshko arrived in North Africa. Later he said "By joining the Foreign Legion, I was not going to return to the Soviet Union, although I had no definite plans for the future. But the service in the Legion, practices in the foreign army with the prosperous [officers'] violence caused me to reconsider my views. I believed the defection to the French partisans would to somehow mitigate my guilt if my service in the 118th police battalion was revealed. I myself did not intend to tell about my service with the Germans."

=== After the war ===
Upon returning to his homeland Meleshko managed to hide the truth about his past. He successfully passed Soviet filtration procedures and was restored to his army rank. In December 1945, he was assigned to reserve forces. He moved far away from the places where he had grown up and came to live in the settlement of Novo-Derkulsky in the region of West Kazakhstan, where he started to practice his pre-war profession as an agronomist and started a family.

Later Meleshko decided to move to his wife's relatives in the Rostov region, but on the way there, he was arrested. During his interrogation, he confessed to having collaborated with the occupiers but he did not say he had served in the 118th police battalion, referring to a battalion of the Ukrainian Liberation Army as his place of service. He stated that while in Belarus, he was guarding railway communications and participated in military operations against partisans. On 5 January 1949, he was convicted for collaboration by a military tribunal of the Moscow Military District. He was sentenced to 25 years in prison and 6 years of loss of his rights. He was serving his sentence in the form of correctional labor in Vorkuta. At the end of 1955 he was granted amnesty in accordance with the Decree of the Presidium of the Supreme Soviet of the USSR of 17 September 1955.

He returned to peaceful life on the Kirov farm in the Rostov region. He had two sons, and his wife, Nikol Meleshko, taught German at a local school. Meleshko became the chief agronomist of a collective farm named after Maxim Gorky. In the early 1970s, his wife died.

=== Trial ===
Meleshko was unmasked by accident. In the 1970s, the collective farm prospered, and a photo of the chief agronomist came to the pages of the regional newspaper Molot. Due to this publication, he was identified.

In September 1974, he was arrested and sent to the pre-trial detention center in the city of Grodno. The trial took place in Minsk behind closed doors, and the press was not allowed access. Survivors of Khatyn and the surrounding villages, as well as Meleshko's former colleagues from the police battalion, were summoned to the court as witnesses. Despite the direct testimony of witnesses, the defendant denied his personal complicity in crimes.

From Vasyl Meleshko's testimony: "At that moment, the barn with people caught fire. The staff translator Lukovich torched it. People in the barn began to shout, asked for mercy, there were screams, a horrible picture, it was terrible to listen to. Someone from the inside broke down the barn door, a burning man jumped out. Then Kerner ordered to open fire at the barn. I received such an order from Vinnytsky, and I gave it to my subordinates. All punishers, who stood in the cordon, began to shoot at people who were in the barn, they were firing two machine guns, which had been set on either sides of the barn. A machine gunner, Leshchenko, was firing one of these guns. My subordinates also were shooting rifles. I personally didn’t shoot, although I had a SVT rifle, I could not shoot at unarmed, innocent people. All the people driven into the barn - mostly women, old people, and children - more than 100 people were shot and burned." The tribunal of the Red Banner Belarusian Military District sentenced Meleshko to death. The Presidium of the Supreme Soviet of the USSR, taking into account the exceptional gravity of the crimes committed by Meleshko, rejected his petition for a pardon. In 1975 Vasyl Meleshko was executed.

== Consequences ==
The materials of the trial of Meleshko helped to reveal information on yet another war criminal, Hyhoriy Vasiura, the battalion's chief of staff, who had led the Khatyn massacre. He was exposed in 1985, and he was executed in 1987. In his testimony, Vasiura characterized his subordinate, saying "That was a gang of bandits, for whom the main thing was to rob and drink. Take [for example] the platoon commander Meleshko - a Soviet cadre officer and a real sadist, he literally raged with the smell of blood... They all were scum among scum. I hated them!"

== See also ==
- Come and See
- Generalplan Ost
- Ukrainian collaboration with Nazi Germany
- Belarusian Auxiliary Police
- Kaminski Brigade
- Oskar Dirlewanger
- Volodymyr Katriuk
- Antonina Makarova
- Feodor Fedorenko
- John Demjanjuk
