= Khatyn massacre =

1943 mass killing of villagers in Nazi-occupied Belarus

- Part of the Eastern Front of World War II
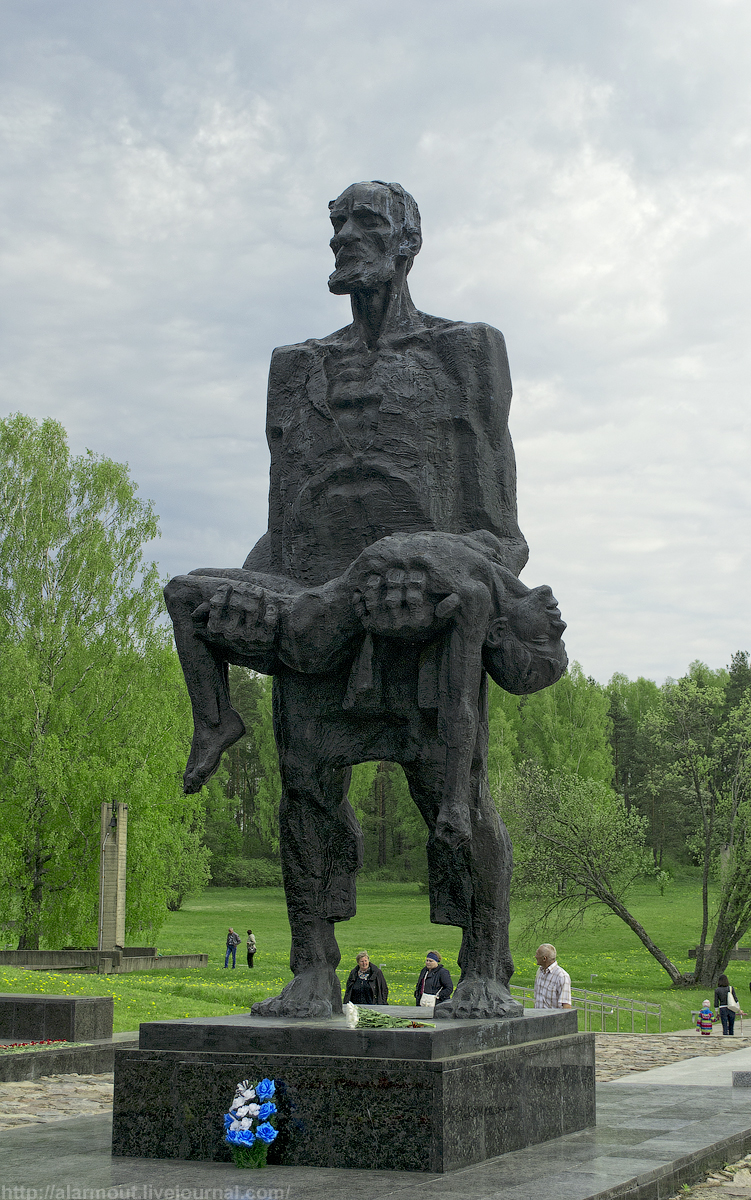
- The sculpture Unbowed Man by Sergei Selikhanov at the Khatyn Memorial site depicts Yuzif Kaminsky, the only adult to survive the massacre, holding his dead son Adam.

- Khatyn massacre (Belarus)
- Location: 54°20′06″N 27°56′42″E; Khatyn, Lahoysk district, Minsk region, Byelorussian Soviet Socialist Republic, Soviet Union
- Date: 22 March 1943
- Target: Belarusians
- Weapons: Immolation and shooting
- Deaths: 149
- Injuries: 2
- Perpetrators: Schutzmannschaft Battalion 118 of the Ukrainian Auxiliary Police; SS-Sonderbataillon Dirlewanger
- Motive: Retaliation for Soviet partisan attack
- Convicted: Vasyl Meleshko; Hryhoriy Vasiura
- Website: khatyn.by/en/khatyn

Khatyn (Belarusian: Хаты́нь, romanized: Khatyń, pronounced [xaˈtɨnʲ]; Russian: Хаты́нь, pronounced [xɐˈtɨnʲ]) was a village of 26 houses and 157 inhabitants in Belarus, in Lahoysk district, Minsk region, 50 km from Minsk. On 22 March 1943, almost its entire population was massacred by the Schutzmannschaft Battalion 118, made up mostly of Ukrainian and other Soviet collaborators, assisted by the SS-Sonderbataillon Dirlewanger, in retaliation for an attack on German troops by Soviet partisans.

== Background ==
The massacre was not unusual in Belarus during World War II. At least 5,295 Belarusian settlements were burned and destroyed by the Nazis, and often all their inhabitants were killed (some amounting to as many as 1,500 victims) as a punishment for collaboration with partisans. In the Vitebsk region, 243 villages were burned down twice, 83 villages three times, and 22 villages were burned down four or more times. In the Minsk region, 92 villages were burned down twice, 40 villages three times, nine villages four times, and six villages five or more times. Altogether, over 2,000,000 people were killed in Belarus during the three years of Nazi occupation, almost a quarter of its population.

== Massacre ==
On 22 March 1943, Battalion 118 received a report of damage to a telephone line between Plyeshchanitsy and Lahoysk. A construction unit from Plyeshchanitsy and two platoons from the 1st company of Battalion 118 proceeded to the site near Kozyri village, 6 km from Khatyn, to restore the line. In the process they were attacked by Soviet partisans, resulting in the deaths of four of the police officers — including Hauptmann Hans Woellke, the Company commander. The partisans immediately fled eastward to Khatyn. The policemen from the platoon pursued them but decided to retreat because they were under strength.

Platoon commander Vasyl Meleshko, who was slightly injured, sent an alarm calling for immediate reinforcement. The message was received by the SS-Sonderbataillon Dirlewanger, to which Schutzmannschaft Battalion 118 was subordinated at that time. (That battalion was made up mostly of Ukrainian and other Soviet collaborators.)

While waiting for reinforcements, Battalion 118 detained a group of 40 to 50 individuals from Kozyri settlement. The group had been recently tasked with chopping down trees alongside roadsides near the Plyeshchanitsy-Lahoysk road. Suspecting them of having something to do with the partisans, Battalion 118 arrested them all and had them taken to Plyeshchanitsy by several local officers. While on their way there, the group panicked and tried to flee, fearing they were about to be executed. 26 were killed by the policemen near the village of Guba. The rest were captured by the Feldgendarmerie and interrogated. The 1st Company and a Ukrainian Platoon of the SS-Sonderbataillon Dirlewanger, under the command of SS-Sturmbannführer Praefke, arrived, and along with men under Hryhoriy Vasiura, launched an attack on Khatyn. The partisans who had fled from the previous attack and taken shelter there decided to defend the village and its outskirts. After surrounding the village, Dirlewanger's men used mortars and heavy guns to suppress further resistance from the partisans. By that afternoon, 34 partisans had been killed and most of Khatyn’s structures had been destroyed. Since the partisans had taken shelter in the village, it was decided to drive every surviving inhabitant into a shed, which was then covered with straw and set on fire. The trapped people managed to break down the front doors but while trying to escape were killed by machine-gun fire. Around 149 people, including 70 (or 75) children under 16 years of age, were killed due to burning, shooting or smoke-inhalation. The village was then looted and burned to the ground.

== Survivors ==
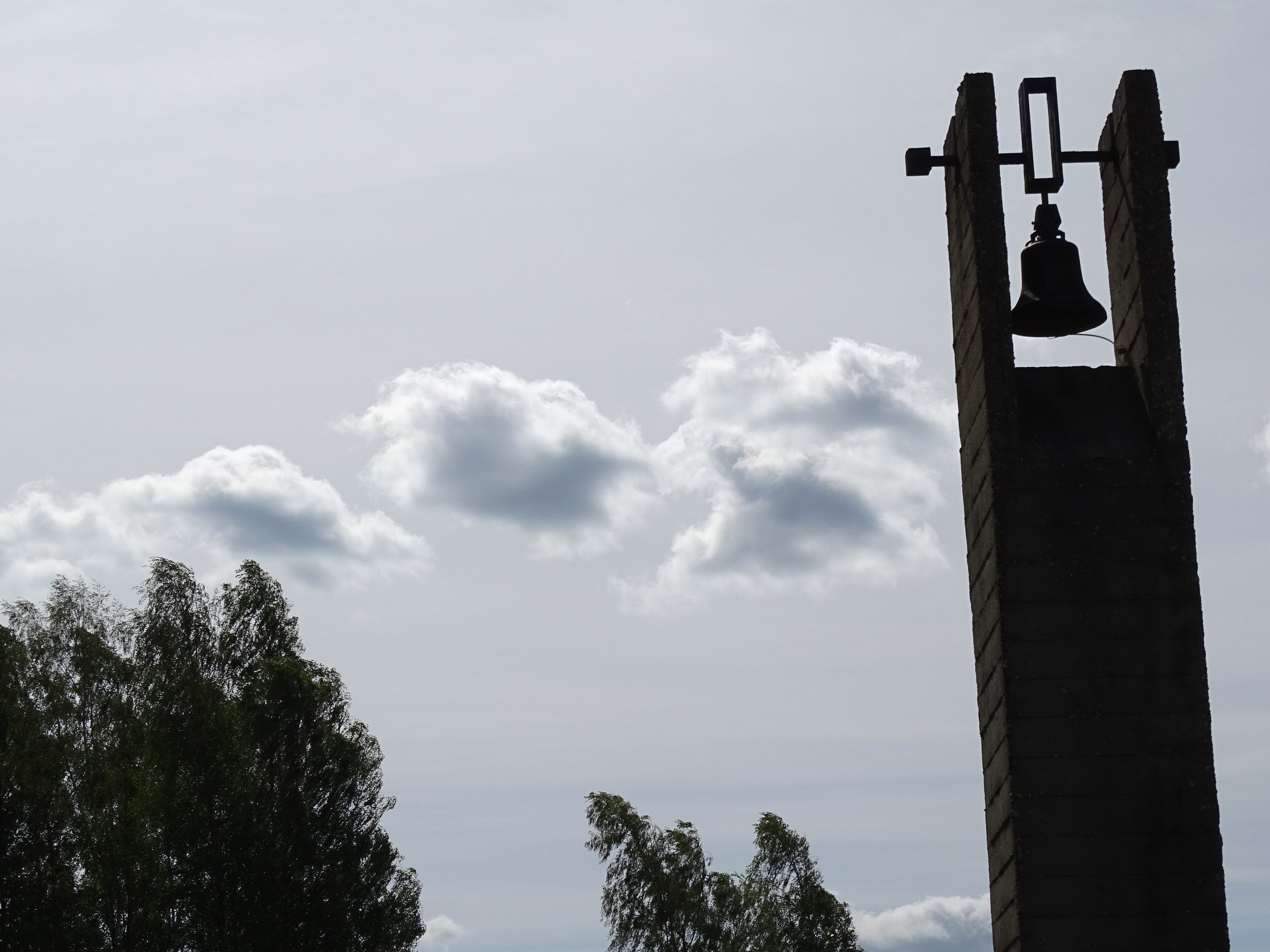
Bell tower at the Khatyn Memorial

Eight inhabitants of the village survived, of whom six witnessed the massacre – five children and an adult.

1. Twelve-year-old Anton Iosifovich Baranovsky (1930–1969) was left for dead with wounds in both legs. His injuries were treated by partisans.
2. The only adult survivor of the massacre, 56-year-old village smith Yuzif Kaminsky (1887–1973), recovered consciousness with wounds and burns after the killers had left. He supposedly found his burned son, who later died in his arms. This incident was later commemorated with a statue at the Khatyn Memorial.
3. Another 12-year-old boy, Alexander Petrovich Zhelobkovich (1930–1994), escaped from the village before the soldiers were able to fully surround it. His mother woke him up and put him on a horse, on which he escaped to a nearby village. After the war, he served in the armed forces and became a reserve lieutenant colonel.
4. Vladimir Antonovich Yaskevich (1930–2008) hid in a potato pit 200 meters from his family house. Two soldiers noticed the boy, but spared him.
5. Sofia Antonovna Yaskevich (later Fiokhina) (1934–2020), Vladimir's sister, hid in the cellar from the early morning of the massacre. As an adult she worked as a typist, and was last reported living in Minsk.
6. Viktor Andreevich Zhelobkovich (1934–2020), a seven-year-old boy, survived the fire in the shed under the corpse of his mother. As an adult, he worked at the design office of a precision engineering company, and was also reported to be living in Minsk.

Two other Khatyn women survived because they were away from the village that day.

- Tatyana Vasilyevna Karaban (1910 – c. 2000s) was visiting relatives in a neighbouring village, Seredniaya.
- Sofya Klimovich, a relative of Karaban, was also visiting a nearby village. After the war she worked at the Memorial for several years.

== Post-war trials ==
In 1946, the officer who ordered the massacre, Bruno Pavel, was prosecuted at the Riga Trial and executed. Ivan Melnichenko, the commander of Dirlewanger's Ukrainian platoon unit which assisted the battalion 118 committing the massacre, was fatally shot by NKVD agents on 26 February 1946 while resisting arrest. Multiple collaborators who participated in the massacre were tried in the 1960s and 1970s. Some of them were executed.

The commander of one of the platoons of 118th Schutzmannschaft Battalion, former Soviet junior lieutenant Vasyl Meleshko, was tried in a Soviet court and executed in 1975.

The chief of staff of 118th Schutzmannschaft Battalion, former Red Army senior lieutenant Hryhoriy Vasiura, was tried in Minsk in 1986 and found guilty of all his crimes. He was sentenced to death by the verdict of the military tribunal of the Belorussian Military District. Vasiura was executed in 1987.

The case and the trial of the main executioner of Khatyn was not given much publicity in the media; the leaders of the Soviet republics worried about the inviolability of unity between the Belarusian and Ukrainian peoples.

== Khatyn Memorial ==
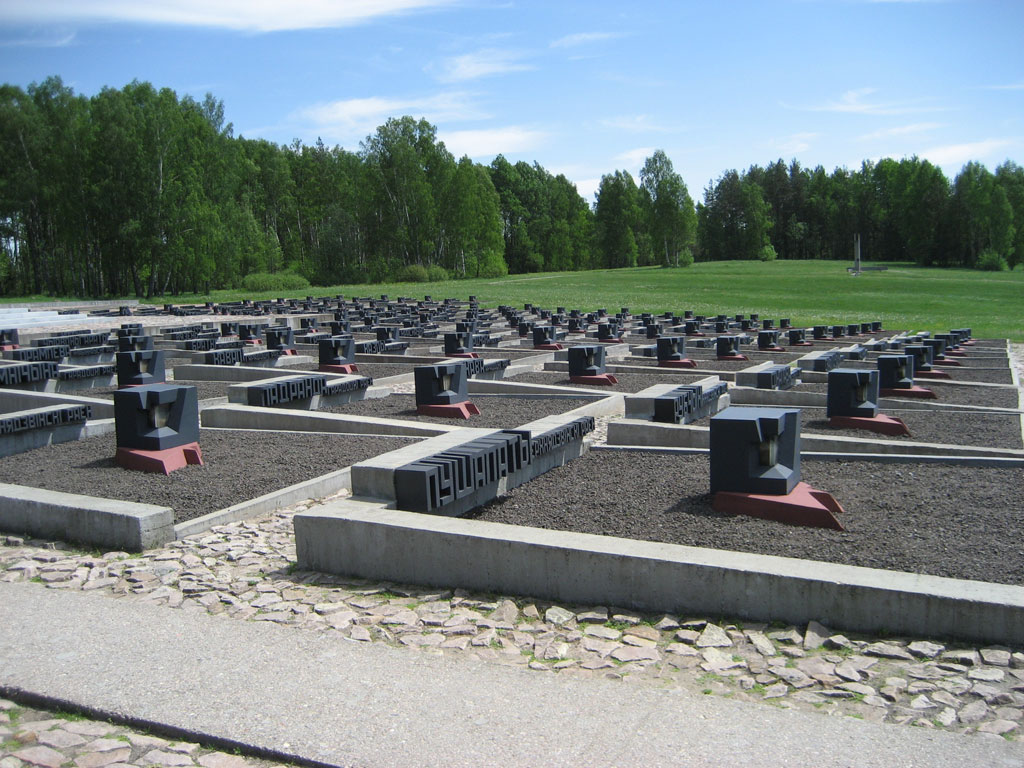
"Cemetery of Villages" with 185 tombs. Each tomb symbolizes a particular village in Belarus which was burned together with its population.

Khatyn became a symbol of mass killings of the civilian population during the fighting between partisans, German troops, and collaborators. In 1969, it was named the national war memorial of the Byelorussian SSR. Among the best-recognized symbols of the memorial complex is a monument with three birch trees, with an eternal flame instead of a fourth tree, a tribute to the one in every four Belarusians who died in the war. There is also a statue of Yuzif Kaminsky carrying his dying son, and a wall with niches to represent the victims of all the concentration camps, with large niches representing those with more than 20,000 victims. Bells ring every 30 seconds to commemorate the rate at which Belarusian lives were lost throughout the duration of the Second World War.

Part of the memorial is a Cemetery of villages with 185 tombs. Each tomb symbolizes a particular village in Belarus that was torched along with its population.

According to Norman Davies, the Khatyn massacre was deliberately exploited by the Soviet authorities to cover up the Katyn massacre, and this was a major reason for erecting the memorial – it was done in order to cause confusion with Katyn among foreign visitors.

In 2004, the Memorial was renovated. According to 2011 data, the Memorial was in the top ten of the most attended tourist sites in Belarus: that year it was visited by 182,000 people.

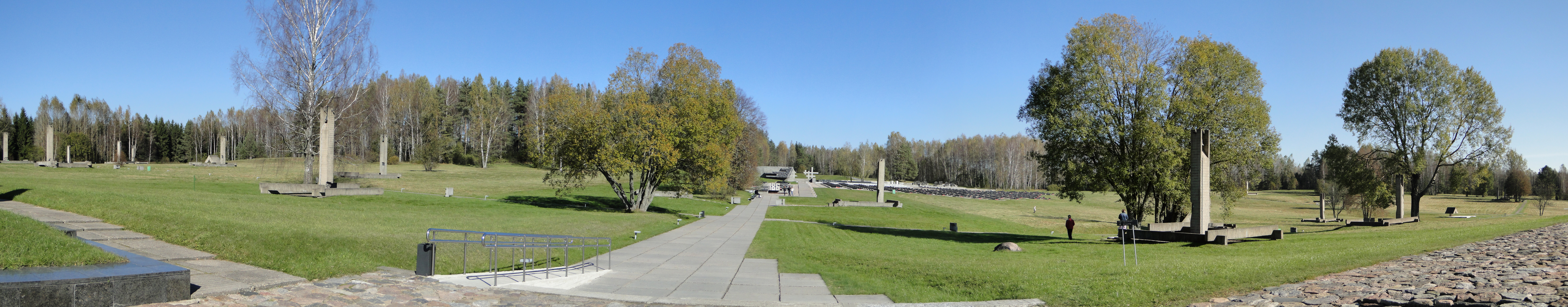
Panorama of the central part of the Khatyn Memorial

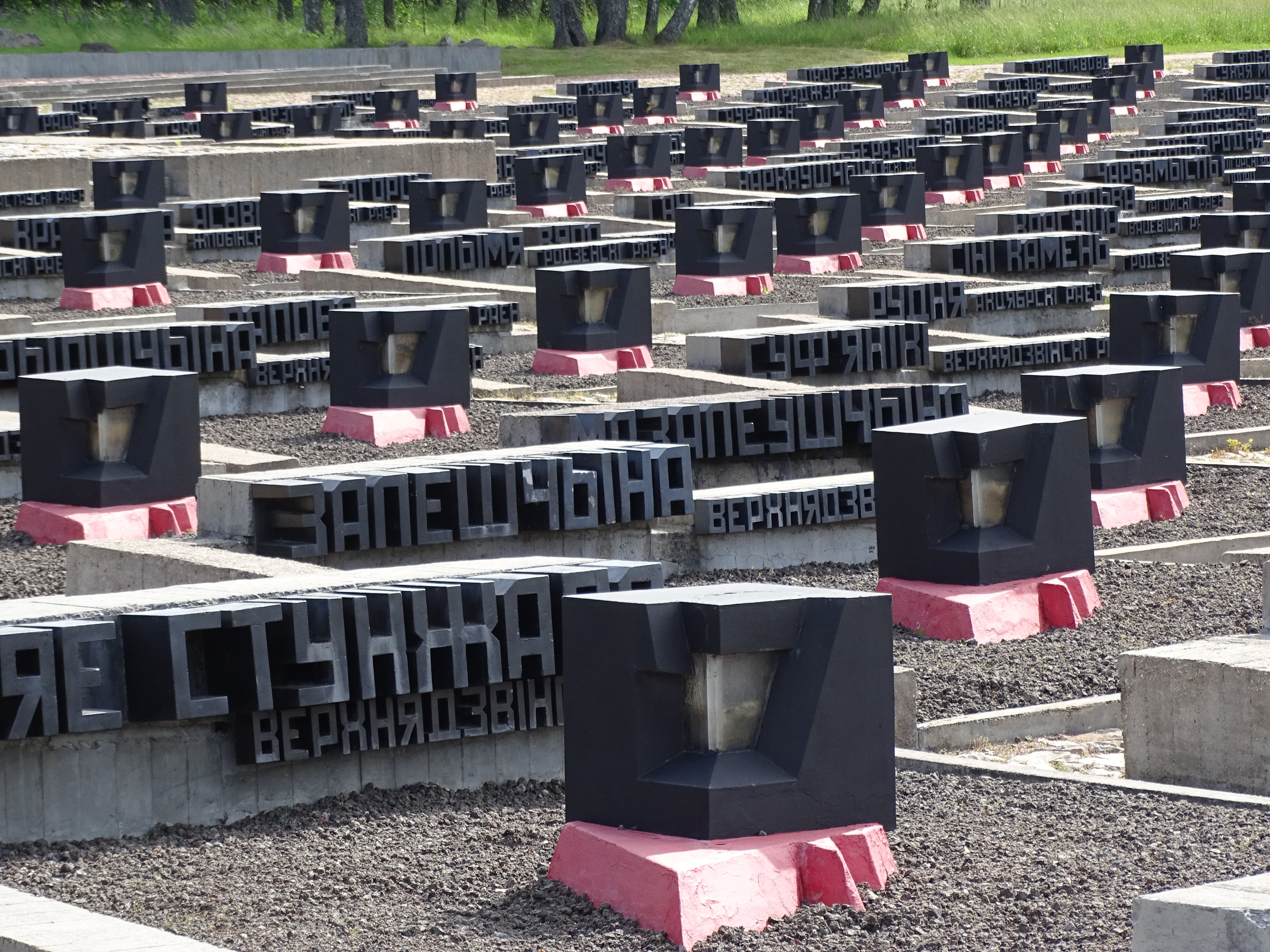
Another view of the Cemetery of Villages

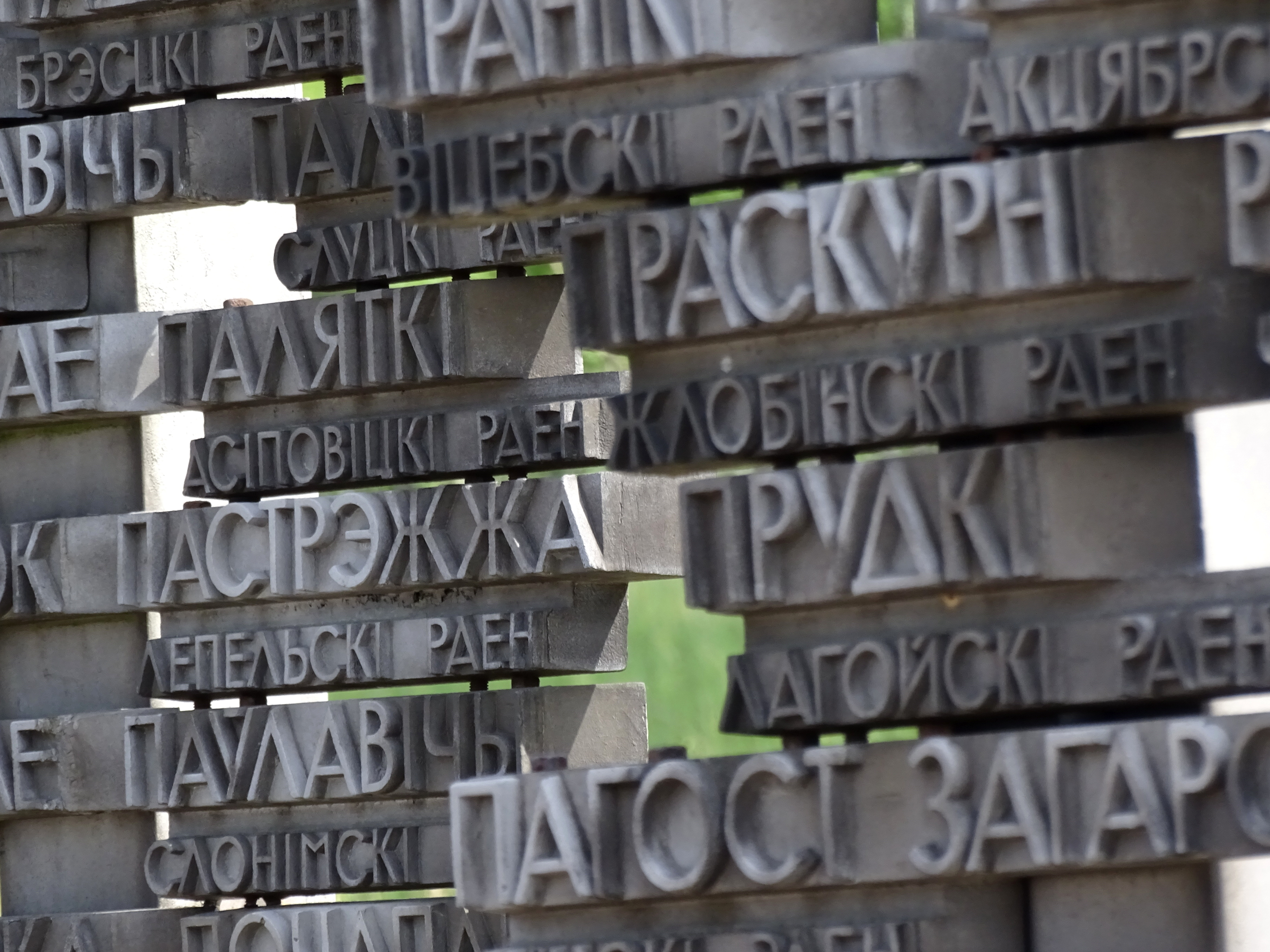
Village names on memorial

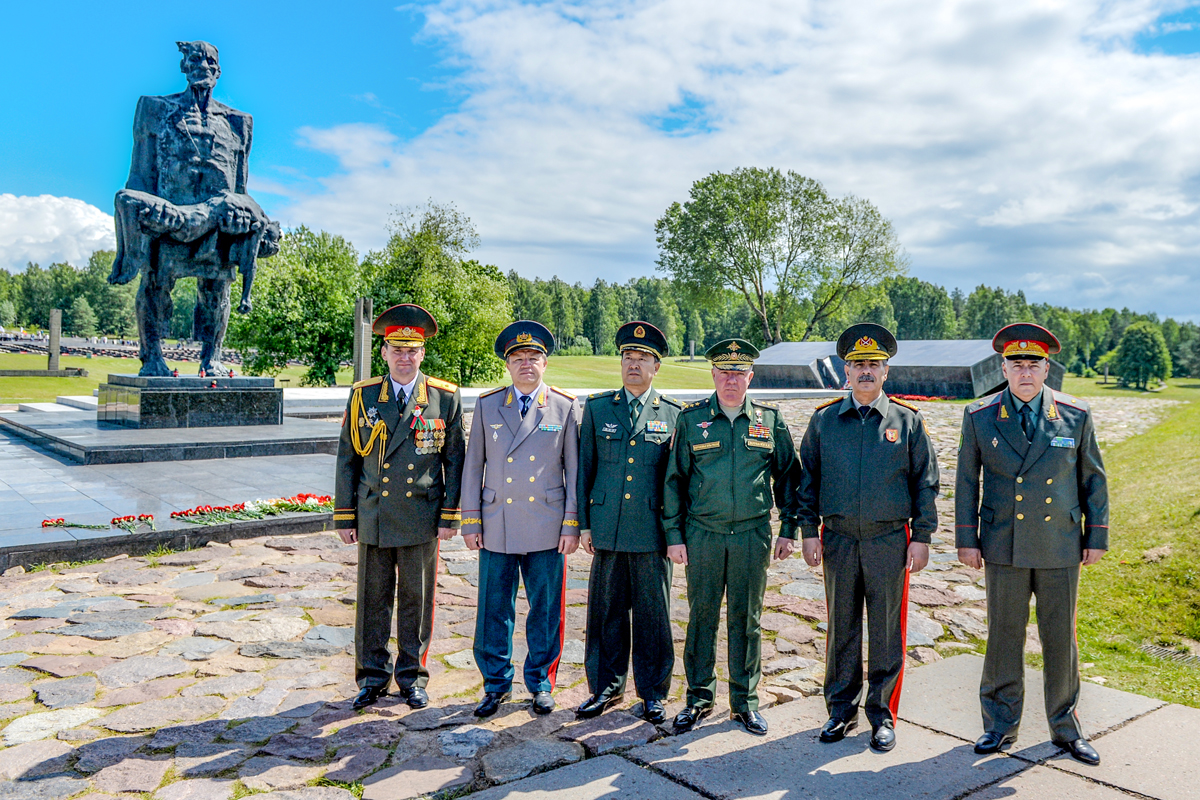
A delegation from Azerbaijan, China, Russia, Kazakhstan and Uzbekistan at the statue of Yuzif Kaminsky

== See also ==
- Come and See, 1985 film about the massacre
- German occupation of Byelorussia during World War II
- Koriukivka massacre
- Ležáky and Lidice
- List of massacres in Belarus
- Michniów
- Oradour-sur-Glane massacre
- Vladimir Katriuk
