= Schutzmannschaft Battalion 118 =

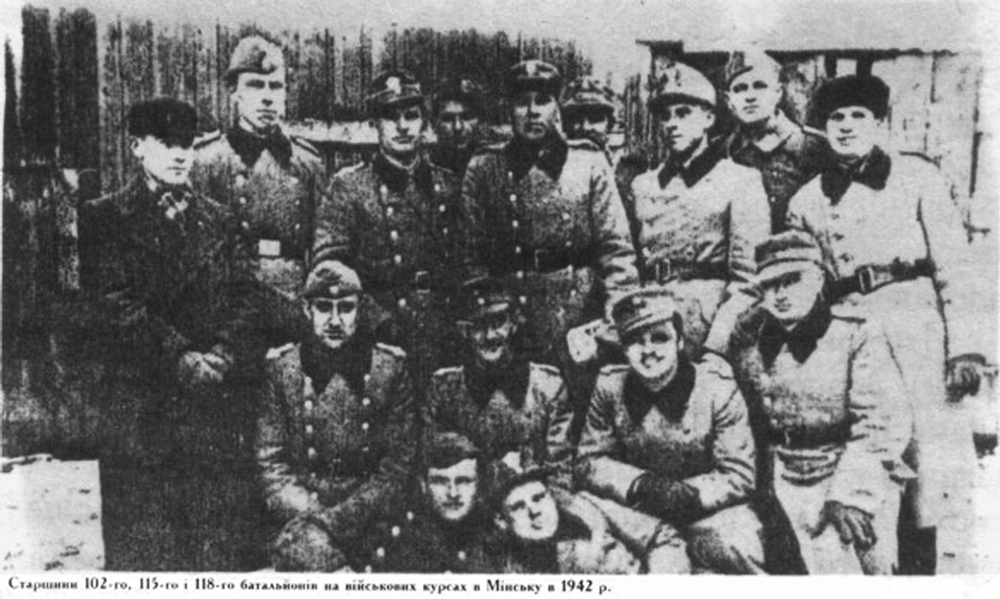
- Commanders of Schutzmannschaft battalions 102, 115, and 118 at a training base in Minsk, spring 1942
- Active: Founded in spring of 1942
- Country: Occupied Poland/Soviet Union
- Allegiance: Nazi Germany
- Branch: Schutzmannschaft
- Type: Paramilitary volunteer brigade
- Role: Nazi security warfare
- Size: 500
- Part of: Erich Koerner (German commander); Konstantin Smovsky (deputy)

Schutzmannschaft Battalion 118 (Ukrainian Schuma) was a Schutzmannschaft auxiliary police battalion (Schuma). The core of the Schutzmannschaft battalion 118 consisted of Ukrainian nationalists from Bukovina in western Ukraine, and the unit included other nationalities. It was linked to the ultra-nationalist Organization of Ukrainian Nationalists (OUN), to its smaller Melnyk wing. Nine-hundred members of the OUN in Bukovina marched towards eastern Ukraine as members of the paramilitary Bukovinian Battalion. After reinforcement by volunteers from Galicia and other parts of Ukraine, the Bukovinian Battalion had a total number of 1,500–1,700 soldiers. When the Bukovinian Battalion was dissolved, many of its members and officers were reorganized as Schutzmannschaft battalions 115 and 118. Among the people incorporated into the Schutzmannschaft battalions 115 and 118 were Ukrainian participants in the Babi Yar massacre.

The Schutzmannschaft Battalion 118 was formed by the Nazis in the spring of 1942 in Kyiv in the Reichskommissariat Ukraine. It was based upon Battalion 115, splitting away from it, but also included Soviet prisoners of war. A hundred members of the 115th Battalion's 3rd Company formed the 118th Battalion's 1st Company; it was the battalion's most active part, considered its elite and consisted mostly of nationalists from western Ukraine. Additionally, two new companies were composed of Soviet POWs, mostly Ukrainians and Russians, and local volunteers from the Kyiv region. The battalion's German commander was Sturmbannführer Erich Körner, who had his own staff of Germans, commanded by Emil Zass.

In 1944, the battalion, led by the former Red Army officer Hryhoriy Vasiura (aged 27, executed in 1987 by the USSR), was merged back to Battalion 115 and transferred from East Prussia to France, where it joined the 30th Waffen Grenadier Division of the SS.

== Operations ==
In November 1942 the newly formed Battalion 118 was transferred to Minsk (occupied Byelorussian SSR, now the capital of sovereign Belarus) and from there for approximately one year to a new base on the outskirts of the former Second Polish Republic. It was active in the area until July 1944. During this time the battalion participated in the German pacification actions, part of the "dead zone" policy of annihilating hundreds of Belarusian villages in order to remove the support base for the alleged partisans. The 60 major and 80 smaller actions affecting 627 villages across occupied Belarus included Operation Hornung, Draufgänger, Cottbus (with 13,000 victims), Hermann (4,280) and Wandsbeck. Entire Jewish communities were exterminated on the general orders of Curt von Gottberg with the necessary backup provided by the Battalions 115 and 102, Baltic collaborators, Belarusian Auxiliary Police, and the SS-Sonderbataillon Dirlewanger. They also fought the Polish underground. Close to 50 men deserted from the 115th battalion in winter of 1942–43, while dozens of the members of 118th battalion joined the Ukrainian Insurgent Army in Volhynia.

In the spring of 1944, due to the Soviet counteroffensive Battalion 118 and Battalion 115 (Ukrainian only) were merged around East Prussia into a single battalion with up to 600 men. In August 1944, all of them were transported by train to Besançon in France to form the 30th Waffen Grenadier Division of the SS along with other Ukrainian formations. While in the village of Valderharn, some members made contact with the French partisans from French Forces of the Interior (FFI) and one night the majority deserted to join them. They named themselves the 2nd Ukrainian "Taras Shevchenko" battalion of the FFI (le 2e bataillon ukrainien des Forces françaises de l'intérieur, Groupement Frontière, Sous-région D.2). However, the French after the war wanted to send them back to Russia in accordance with their international agreements, therefore many of the former volunteers continued service in the French Foreign Legion to avoid repatriation.

=== Accusation in atrocities and war crimes ===
Due to participation in a series of punitive actions, some members of Schutzmannschaft Battalion 118 have been later accused of committing most brutal atrocities and war crimes during World War II. The Khatyn massacre occurred in Khatyn, a village in Belarus, in the Lahoysk District, Minsk Region. On March 22, 1943, the population of the village was massacred by Battalion 118.

In Khatyn, the members of Battalion 118 filled a farmer's barn with civilians, set it on fire, and used a machine gun to kill the civilians who tried to escape the flames: "One witness stated that Volodymyr Katriuk was a particularly active participant in the atrocity: he reportedly lay behind the stationary machine gun, firing rounds on anyone attempting to escape the flames". A Soviet Union war-crimes trial in 1973 heard that three members of the Schutzmannschaft Battalion 118 killed a group of Belarusian loggers earlier that day, suspecting they were part of a popular uprising. "I saw how Ivankiv was firing with a machine gun upon the people who were running for cover in the forest, and how Katriuk and Meleshko were shooting the people lying on the road," the witness said. The Schutzmannschaft Battalion 118 was chiefly responsible for the creation of German "dead zones". The dead zone policy involved exterminating communities suspected, or capable of aiding the Soviet partisans who had launched ambushes against Nazi forces in Belarus.

== Personnel ==
The battalion consisted of three companies totalling 500 men, which in turn were divided into three platoons each:

Commanders

- Erich Körner, deputies Konstantin Smowski and Shudrya

Company leaders

- First Company: Hauptmann Hans Woellke (leader), Vinnitsky (deputy)
- Second Company: Herman (leader), Franczuk (deputy),
- Third Company: Müller (leader), Naradko (deputy).

Platoon leaders

- Vasyl Meleshko (Мелешко)
- Pasichnyk (Пасечник)
- Hryhoriy Vasiura (until December 1942)

Chiefs-of-Staff

- Korniyets (until December 1942),
- Hryhoriy Vasiura (from December 1942).

Known privates

Names of individuals on record include: I. Kozynchenko, G. Spivak, S. Sakhno, O. Knap, T. Topchiy, I. Petrichuk, Lakusta (Лакуста), Lukovich (Лукович), Scherban, Varlamov, Khrenov, Yegorov, Subbotin, Iskanderov, Khachaturyan, and Vladimir Katriuk (Катрюк), implicated by witness along with Ivankiv, and Meleshko (Мелешко). Tried in the Soviet Union and sentenced to minor prison terms (for political reasons, as good citizens) were Fedorenko (Федоренко), Golchenko (Гольченко), Vertelnikov (Вертельников), Gontarev (Гонтарев), Funk (Функ), Medvedev (Медведев), Yakovlev (Яковлев), Lappo (Лаппо), Osmakov (Осьмаков), Sulzhenko (Сульженко), Trofimov (Трофимов), Vorobya (Воробья), Kolbasin (Колбасин), and Muravev (Муравьёв).

== Bibliography ==
- Petrouchkevitch, Natalia. Victims and Criminals: Schutzmannschaft Battalion 118 (Belarus, Ukraine). Thesis, Department of History, Wilfrid Laurier University, 1999. https://scholars.wlu.ca/etd/35
- Rudling, Per Anders (2011). "Terror and Local Collaboration in Occupied Belarus: The Case of Schutzmannschaft Battalion 118. Part I: Background" (PDF). Historical Yearbook. Vol. VIII. Bukarest.
- Rudling, Per Anders (2012). "Terror and Local Collaboration in Occupied Belarus: The Case of Schutzmannschaft Battalion 118. Part II: War Criminality" (PDF). Historical Yearbook. Vol. VIII. Bukarest.
