= Plyeshchanitsy rural council =

Plyeshchanitsy rural council is a lower-level subdivision (selsoviet) of Lahoysk district, Minsk region, Belarus.
