= Akalova rural council =

Akalova rural council is a lower-level subdivision (selsoviet) of Lahoysk district, Minsk region, Belarus.
