= Hayna rural council =

Hayna rural council is a lower-level subdivision (selsoviet) of Lahoysk district, Minsk region, Belarus.
