= Astroshytsy rural council =

Lower-level subdivision in Minsk region, Belarus

Astroshytsy rural council is a lower-level subdivision (selsoviet) of Lahoysk district, Minsk region, Belarus.
