= Kamyena rural council =

Kamyena rural council is a lower-level subdivision (selsoviet) of Lahoysk district, Minsk region, Belarus.

== Rural localities ==
The populations are from the 2009 Belarusian census and 2019 Belarusian census

Russian name	Belarusian name	Pop. 2009	Pop. 2019
Каменский сельсовет	Каменскі сельсавет	897	902
д Ганцевичи	в Ганцавічы	52	53
д Желуды	в Жалуды	20	11
д Закалюжье	в Закалюжжа	74	55
д Заценье	в Зацэнне	53	45
д Козинец	в Казінец	38	35
аг Камено	аг Камена	481	546
д Каменская Слобода	в Каменская Слабада	15	12
д Липки	в Ліпкі	23	22
д Малиновка	в Малінаўка	2	8
д Мокрадь	в Мокрадзь	9	8
д Новоганцевичи	в Наваганцавічы	6	2
д Новоганцевичская Слобода	в Наваганцавіцкая Слабада	1	-
д Новоганцевичская Рудня	в Наваганцавіцкая Рудня	8	5
д Пограничье	в Пагранічча	12	6
д Подлапье	в Падлап'е	8	3
д Селище	в Селішча	2	5
д Середнее	в Сярэдняе	9	3
д Стайки	в Стайкі	20	11
д Староганцевичская Слобода	в Стараганцавіцкая Слабада	28	26
д Фильяново	в Фільянова	9	12
д Хворостени	в Хварасцяні	11	15
д Чмелевичи	в Чмялевічы	16	19
