= Zadorye rural council =

Subdivision of Lahoysk, Minsk, Belarus

Coordinates: 54.59335°N 27.76230°E

Zadorye rural council is a lower-level subdivision (selsoviet) of Lahoysk district, Minsk region, Belarus.
