= Aktsyabrski, Lahoysk district rural council =

Aktsyabrski rural council is a lower-level subdivision (selsoviet) of Lahoysk district, Minsk region, Belarus.
