= Helmut Oberlander =

German-Ukrainian alleged Nazi war criminal (1924–2021)

- Born: 15 February 1924; Molochansk, Ukrainian SSR, Soviet Union (now Ukraine)
- Died: 20 September 2021 (aged 97); Waterloo, Ontario, Canada
- Military career
- Allegiance: Nazi Germany
- Branch: Sonderkommando 10a
- Conflicts: World War II

Helmut Oberlander (15 February 1924 – 20 September 2021) was a naturalized Canadian citizen who was a member of the Einsatzgruppen death squads of Nazi Germany in the occupied Soviet Union during World War II. Oberlander was on the Simon Wiesenthal Center's list of most wanted Nazi war criminals. Beginning in 1994, the Government of Canada made several attempts to revoke Oberlander's citizenship on the basis of his misrepresenting his involvement with Nazi war crimes.

In 2017, after the fourth attempt by the government to strip him of his citizenship, he lost his appeal, as the Federal Court found this revocation "reasonable", and in 2019 the Federal Court of Appeal unanimously dismissed his motion to have his case re-opened. On 5 December 2019, the Supreme Court of Canada declined to hear Oberlander's appeal, clearing the way for his deportation. In early 2020, however, Oberlander was still in Canada and had filed a new appeal against his planned deportation. He later lost his appeal, which had him face a deportation hearing. On or about 19 March 2021, the lawyer representing Oberlander filed a motion for a permanent stay of proceedings against his client. The motion was denied by judge Denis Gascon who ruled that a permanent stay of immigration proceedings would be "premature" and called for an administrative review by the Immigration Department of the Immigration and Refugee Board of Canada.

== Early life ==
Oberlander was born on 15 February 1924 in Molochansk, or Molochna Colony, a Russian Mennonite settlement in what is now Zaporizhzhia Oblast in Ukraine, in 1924.

== Wartime ==
As an ethnic German born and living in Ukraine (at the time part of the Soviet Union) during World War II, he was conscripted at the age of 17 and served as an interpreter for the SS-Sonderkommando 10a (Sk 10a) which was part of Einsatzgruppe D when it entered Soviet Ukraine in 1941. He was also a member of the Sicherheitsdienst and Sicherheitspolizei — the counter-intelligence and security police of the SS. He said his duties were limited to listening to and translating Russian radio transmissions, acting as an interpreter during interactions between the military and the local population, and guarding of military supplies, although the testimony of other Sk 10a members contradicted this.

The Federal Court of Canada, in Oberlander v. Canada (Attorney General), determined that Oberlander was part of the Sk 10a (which was part of Einsatzgruppe D) during World War II. The Federal Court of Canada characterized the group (Einsatzguppe D) as one of several death squads, responsible for killing more than two million people, most of whom were civilians and largely Jewish. According to the ruling, from 1941 to 1943 Oberlander served with Sk 10a as an interpreter and an auxiliary. In addition to interpreting, he was tasked with finding and protecting food and polishing boots. He lived, ate, travelled and worked full-time with the Sk 10a. From 1943 to 1944, he served as an infantryman in the German army.

== Life in Canada ==
Oberlander immigrated to Canada with his wife Margaret in 1954, where he ran a successful construction business and lived in Kitchener-Waterloo, Ontario. He became a Canadian citizen in 1960.

=== Investigation ===
The RCMP Security Service opened a file on Oberlander in 1963. In 1970, he lied to West German war crimes investigators, claiming not to have heard of Einsatzkommando 10a and that he was unaware of any executions of Jews by his unit. His was among 29 cases selected for "special attention" by a Commission of Inquiry on War Criminals because of "the seriousness of the allegations and the availability of evidence." In its 1986 final report, the Commission recommended criminal prosecution in Canadian courts for Nazi war criminals. Failing that, it recommended any who concealed their wartime activities when applying to immigrate to Canada be stripped of their citizenship and deported. On Oberlander in particular, the Commission concluded that he should never have been able to enter Canada and so should have his citizenship revoked.

=== Revocation of citizenship ===
On 28 April 1995, the Government of Canada initiated a denaturalization and deportation process against Oberlander. Oberlander fled to Florida, but was sent back to Canada by the US Justice Department a few weeks later. On 28 February 2000, Judge Andrew MacKay reported his findings: he concluded that there is no evidence that Oberlander was involved, directly or indirectly, in committing any war crimes or any crimes against humanity. He might not have, however, disclosed his wartime record during his immigration interview in 1953 in Karlsruhe, Germany. The Government of Canada determined that withholding this information was sufficient reason to strip Oberlander of his Canadian citizenship. The German Canadian Congress and the Ukrainian Canadian Civil Liberties Association lobbied against this, arguing there was "no compelling evidence that there are any such people hiding in Canada," and Andrew Telegdi, who was Oberlander's Member of Parliament, and who was at the time parliamentary secretary to the Minister of Citizenship of Immigration, resigned from that position in objection to this decision.

In October 2008, the government revoked Oberlander's citizenship. In November 2009 the Federal Court of Appeal struck down this decision, thus reinstating his citizenship.

In 2012, Oberlander was again stripped of his citizenship through an Order in Council of the Government of Canada. Oberlander appealed the 2012 order to the Federal Court of Canada, which the court rejected in 2015. Oberlander then appealed the 2015 decision to the Canadian Federal Court of Appeal. In 2016 the court accepted his appeal, setting aside the government's 2012 Order in Council. In July 2016, the Supreme Court of Canada denied the government's request for leave to appeal the decision. Consequently, in order to deport Oberlander for trial, the government must first prove that he was a willing participant in death squad activities due to a 2013 Supreme Court ruling that guilt by association is not sufficient grounds to be considered a war criminal.

In July 2017, the Government of Canada used an Order in Council to strip Oberlander of his Canadian citizenship for the fourth time. In September 2018, Federal Court judge Michael Phelan ruled that this fourth revocation was lawful. Only the Federal Court of Appeal can hear an appeal of Phelan's decision and Oberlander did not have an automatic right to appeal the latest court decision but had to seek leave to appeal. A news report stated that he "faced increased risks of prosecution if ever deported to Germany, where he was once a citizen. In a change of policy, Germany is now trying former auxiliaries in their 90s for being accomplices in Nazi war crimes". On 25 April 2019, the Federal Court of Appeal dismissed Oberlander's motion to have his case re-opened because of an alleged bias by Justice Michael Phelan in 2008. The decision of the Appeal court was unanimous. On 5 December 2019, the Supreme Court of Canada declined to grant Oberlander's leave to appeal the Federal Court decision, clearing the way for his deportation.

In February 2020, however, Oberlander was still in Canada and had filed a new appeal against his planned deportation. In October 2020, he lost his appeal to the Immigration and Refugee Board, and would move onto a deportation hearing. In April 2021, the Federal Court of Canada dismissed Oberlander's lawyers' attempt to halt deportation proceedings.

== Death ==
Oberlander died at his home in Waterloo, Ontario, on 20 September 2021, at the age of 97.

== See also ==
- Vladimir Katriuk
- Walter Obodzinsky
- Yaroslav Hunka
- Imre Finta
- List of most-wanted Nazi war criminals
- War criminals in Canada
