= Vladimir Katriuk =

Ukrainian-Canadian Nazi collaborator (1921–2015)

Volodymyr Katriuk
- Katriuk during his last years of life in Quebec, Canada
- Born: 1 October 1921; Lujeni, Cernăuți County, Kingdom of Romania (now Luzhany, Chernivtsi Oblast, Ukraine)
- Died: 22 May 2015 (aged 93); Salaberry-de-Valleyfield, Quebec, Canada
- Military career
- Allegiance: Nazi Germany (1942–1944); French Resistance
- Branch: Schutzmannschaft (1942–1944); French Foreign Legion
- Rank: Private (in French Foreign Legion)
- Unit: Schutzmannschaft Battalion 118
- Conflicts: World War II

Volodymyr Katriuk (1 October 1921 – 22 May 2015) was a Ukrainian-Canadian soldier and beekeeper, who was accused of having taken part in the Khatyn massacre and other massacres under the cover of anti-partisan warfare as a member of the Schutzmannschaft Battalion 118 during World War II. In the annual Nazi War Criminal Report for the years 2012, 2013 and 2014, Katriuk was ranked number three under the list of most-wanted Nazi war criminals as determined by the Simon Wiesenthal Center. Katriuk denied any involvement in war crimes. On 18 March 2024, the Supreme Court of Belarus ruled that Katriuk was guilty of the "genocide of the Belarusian people".

== Early life ==
Katriuk was born in the village of Luzhany, near the city of Chernivtsi, on 1 October 1921. Chernivtsi is situated in the Bukovina region, which was then part of the Kingdom of Romania.

== Second World War ==
In 1942 Katriuk joined Schutzmannschaft Battalion 118 to fight the Soviet partisans. Katriuk's Nazi ties were known at the time of a 1999 Federal Court of Canada decision, but more details did not emerge until the release in 2008 of KGB interrogation reports at the trial of Hryhoriy Vasiura, one of the battalion officers. The new KGB documents, yet unseen by the general public, claim that Katriuk was directly involved in the Khatyn massacre.

In an article published in Holocaust and Genocide Studies, Lund University historian Per Anders Rudling, relying on new KGB interrogation reports, wrote that "One witness stated that Volodymyr Katriuk was a particularly active participant in the atrocity: he reportedly lay behind the stationary machine gun, firing rounds on anyone attempting to escape the flames." Rudling also said that Katriuk was "an active participant in the ‘pacification’ of the Jewish partisans of the Naliboki forest".

Another Soviet war crimes trial in 1973 heard that Katriuk and two others killed a group of Belarusian loggers earlier on that day, suspecting they were part of a popular uprising. "I saw how Ivankiv was firing with a machine gun upon the people who were running for cover in the forest, and how Katriuk and Meleshko were shooting the people lying on the road," the witness said. Katriuk was a member of Schutzmannschaft Battalion 118 that helped the Nazis to create "dead zones." The dead zone policy involved exterminating Soviet partisans who had launched ambushes against Nazi forces.

=== Double defection ===
Katriuk claimed in Federal Court that in August 1944 he defected with the entire battalion and joined the French Resistance to fight the Nazis. Later that year he was transferred to the French Foreign Legion, as a private, and was one of twenty to twenty-five volunteers who were dispatched by their French commanders to go to the front to fight the German army. Katriuk was placed in charge of a machine gun and, during the course of his service, was severely injured.

He spent two and a half months in an American hospital in France. Katriuk claimed to have fought later at the Italian front near Monaco until the end of World War II. He remained in the Foreign Legion to avoid repatriation, but soon learned that his unit would be sent to fight in Indochina, to which his commanding officer, whom he had a poor relationship with, said that Katriuk would be unlikely to survive. Katriuk deserted while on leave in July 1945, obtained false identity papers with a new birthday, under the name of his brother-in-law, and got a job in a butcher shop in Paris.

== Later life ==
In 1951, Katriuk immigrated to Canada from France. In 1959, he became a beekeeper in Ormstown, Quebec, where he owned a beekeeping farm and lived in a small house on the property with his wife Maria.

=== Canadian citizenship question ===
In August 1996, Katriuk was notified that the Canadian government was seeking to revoke his citizenship. The decision was to be made by the Cabinet of Canada. In 1999, a Federal Court of Canada decision concluded that Katriuk immigrated to the country under a pseudonym and obtained his Canadian citizenship by providing false information. However, the court found no evidence that Katriuk had participated in war crimes, and in 2007, the cabinet halted revocation proceedings. In 2012, the Canadian government pledged to re-examine the case, although this did not occur.

=== Death ===
Katriuk died of a stroke in a hospital in Salaberry-de-Valleyfield, Quebec on 22 May 2015 at the age of 93. Two weeks before his death, the Investigative Committee of Russia called on Canada to deport Katriuk to the Russian Federation so he could stand trial, according to international law; the Canadian government, whose relations with the Russian government have been strained since the 2014 Russian annexation of Crimea, ignored the request.

== See also ==
- Other Canadian citizens accused of participating in Nazi war crimes:
  - Imre Finta
  - Helmut Oberlander
  - Walter Obodzinsky
- People convicted of participating in the Khatyn massacre
  - Vasyl Meleshko
  - Hryhoriy Vasiura
- Ukrainian Auxiliary Police
