= Walter Obodzinsky =

Polish-Canadian Axis collaborator and war criminal

- Born: 5 July 1919; Turzec, Poland
- Died: 6 March 2004 (aged 84); Canada
- Military career
- Branch: Wehrmacht
- Conflicts: World War II

Walter Obodzinsky (5 July 1919 – 6 March 2004), also known as Volodya Obodzinsky, was a Polish-born member of the Wehrmacht. He gained notoriety when the Canadian government sought to revoke his citizenship in 1999, on the basis that Obodzinsky had concealed his past Nazi activities.

== Life ==
Obodzinsky was born July 5, 1919, in Turzec, Poland. Between 1941 and 1944, Obodzinsky collaborated with Nazi occupiers in Belarus, serving as a member of the auxiliary police, Wehrmacht and Jagdzug. Obodzinsky joined an auxiliary police unit under the command of Heinrich Himmler in 1941. The unit later participated in the massacre of 1300-1500 Jews in the ghetto of Mir, Belarus.

From March to July 1944, Obodzinsky was a member of the Wehrmacht. He deserted the Wehrmacht in July 1944 while stationed in France. From December 1944 to May 1945, Obodzinsky fought on the Italian front with the Second Company of the 21st Infantry Battalion of the Polish Second Corps.

== Canadian deportation proceedings ==
In late 1946, Obodzinsky gained temporary admission to Canada from Italy. He was permanently admitted to Canada in 1950, and gained Canadian citizenship in 1955. In 1994, based on information received by the Canadian War Crimes Investigation Unit from the British War Crimes Investigation Unit, the Royal Canadian Mounted Police opened an investigation into Obodzinsky's activities during World War II. In 1999, Obodzinsky was served with a Notice of Intent to Revoke Citizenship by the Canadian government, on the basis that he had not revealed his war crimes during World War II.

In a 2003 ruling that ultimately revoked Obodzinsky's Canadian citizenship, Justice François Lemieux of the Federal Court of Canada described Obodzinsky as "an accomplice in the perpetration of atrocities committed, undeniably, during the German occupation of Belarus." The Government of Canada suspended its attempts to denaturalize Obodzinsky following his death on March 6, 2004.

== See also ==
- Helmut Oberlander
- Vladimir Katriuk
- Imre Finta
