= Silichy =

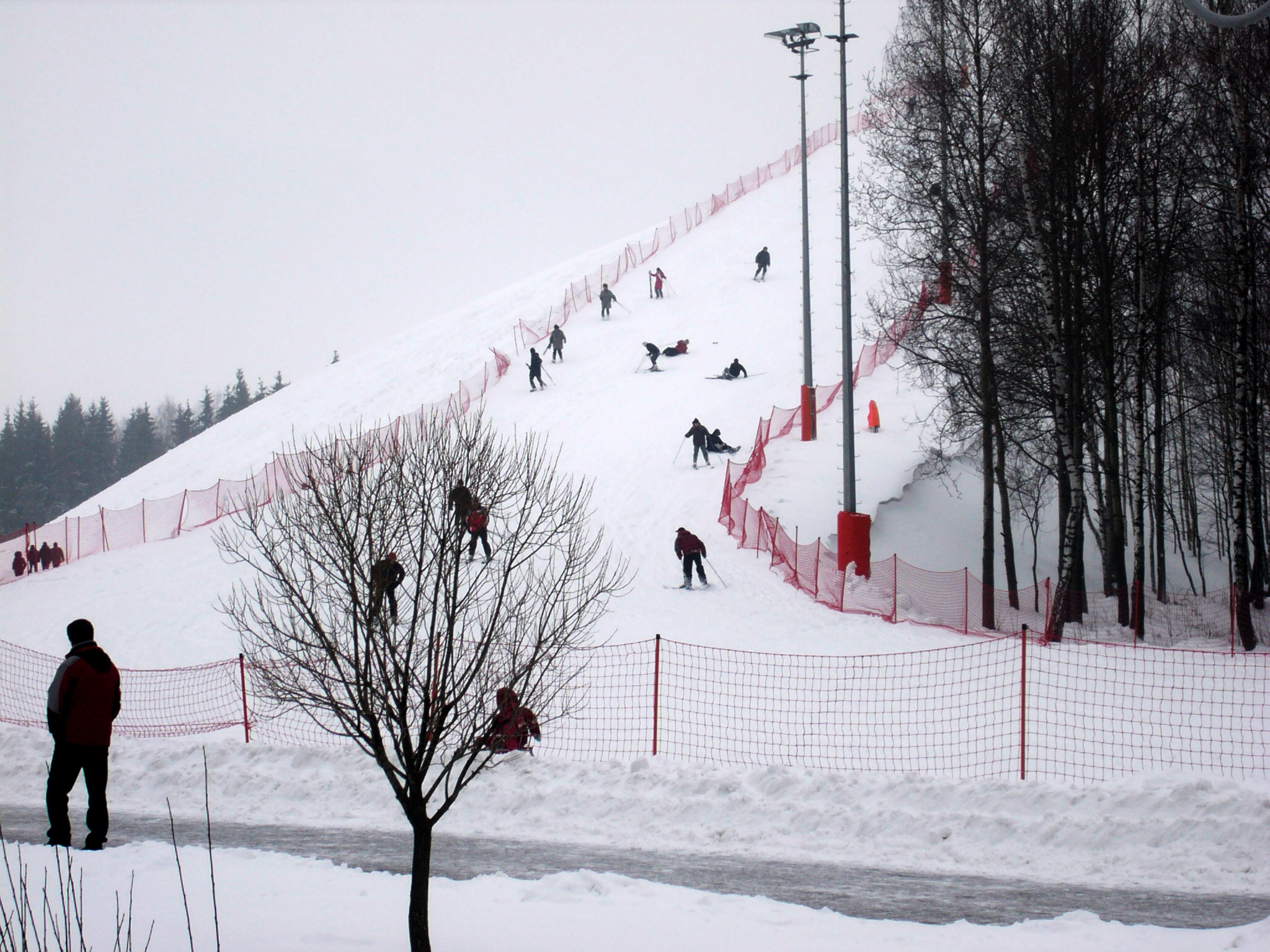
- Interactive map of Silichy
- Location: Belarus
- Nearest city: Lahojsk
- Coordinates: 54°08′54″N 27°50′05″E
- Skiable area: 2.5 km (1.55 mi)
- Website: http://www.silichy.by/

Silichy or Silichi (Russian: Силичи, Belarusian: Сілічы) is a ski resort situated in Lahojsk (or Logoysk), Belarus, located 30 km (18.64 mi) away from Minsk. Silichy was opened on January 29, 2005. The length of 3 routes for skiing is 2.5 km (1.55 mi), and it has a 4-chair elevator.

The mountain skiing season starts in December and lasts until March (until there is no snow).

This resort is open all year round, with other activities than skiing.
