= Luzhany =

Rural locality in Chernivtsi Oblast, Ukraine

Luzhany Лужани
- Rural settlement
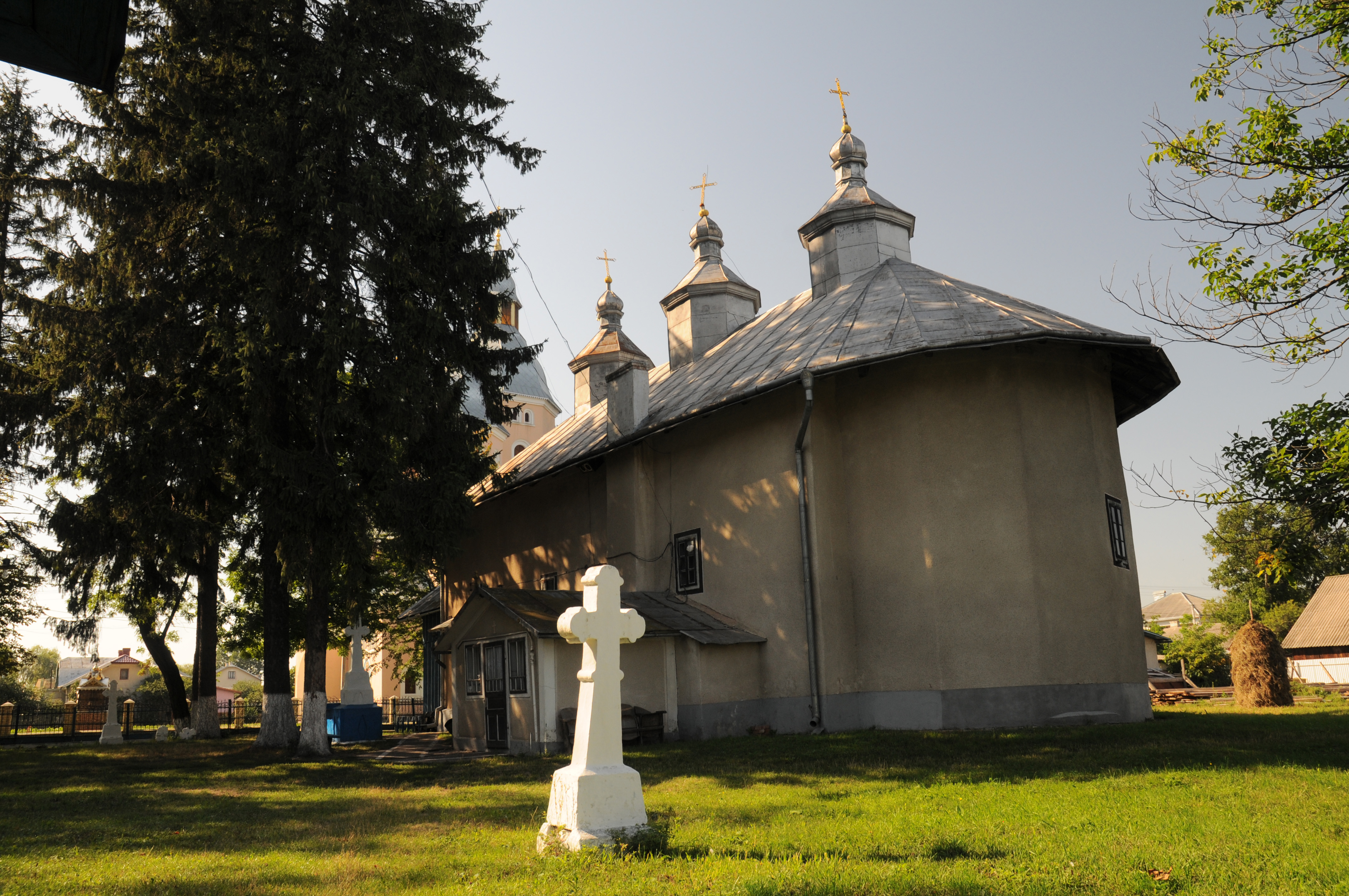
- Luzhany Voznesenska church

- Location of Luzhany in Ukraine Luzhany (Ukraine)
- Coordinates: 48°21′47″N 25°45′43″E
- Country: Ukraine
- Oblast: Chernivtsi Oblast
- Raion: Chernivtsi Raion
- First mentioned: 1452
- Urban status since: 1968

Government
  - Town Head: Nataliya Katriuk
- Elevation: 179 m (587 ft)

Population (2001)
  - Total: 4,744
- Time zone: UTC+2 (EET)
  - Summer (DST): UTC+3 (EEST)
- Postal code: 59342
- Area code: +380 3736
- Website: http://rada.gov.ua/

Luzhany (Ukrainian: Лужани; Romanian: Lujeni; German: Luschany or Luzan Yiddish: לוזשאן, romanized: Luzshan) is a rural settlement in Chernivtsi Raion, Chernivtsi Oblast, western Ukraine. It belongs to Mamaivtsi rural hromada, one of the hromadas of Ukraine.

The settlement lies on the banks of the Prut River, about 13 km (8.1 mi) northwest of the regional capital Chernivtsi. As of the 2001 census, the town's population is 4,744. Current population: 4,781 (2022 estimate).

== History ==
First mentioned in a 1452 deed, Luzhany belonged to the Danubian Principality of Moldavia until 1774/75, when upon the Russo-Turkish War its northwestern parts (the Bukovina) were ceded to the Habsburg monarchy. Incorporated into the Austrian Duchy of Bukovina from 1849, the area was incorporated into Greater Romania after World War I. In 1940, as a result of a secret clause of the Molotov–Ribbentrop pact between Hitler and Stalin, the Romanian state was forced to cede Northern Bukovina to the Soviet Union.

In 1968, Luzhany received urban-type settlement status.

Luzhany became part of independent Ukraine in 1991.

Until 18 July 2020, Luzhany belonged to Kitsman Raion. The raion was abolished in July 2020 as part of the administrative reform of Ukraine, which reduced the number of raions of Chernivtsi Oblast to three. The area of Kitsman Raion was split between Chernivtsi Raion and Vyzhnytsia Raion, with Luzhany being transferred to Chernivtsi Raion.

On 26 January 2024, a new law entered into force which abolished the status of urban-type settlement in Ukraine, and Luzhany became a rural settlement.

== Notable people ==
- Vladimir Katriuk (1921 – 2015), Canadian man of Ukrainian ancestry, accused of war crimes
- Yuriy Shelepnytskyi (born 1965), Ukrainian professional football coach and former player for FC Bukovyna Chernivtsi.

== See also ==
- FC Luzhany (Chernivtsi Oblast)
