= Plyeshchanitsy =

Urban-type settlement in Minsk Region, Belarus

Plyeshchanitsy Плешчаніцы (Belarusian)
- Urban-type settlement
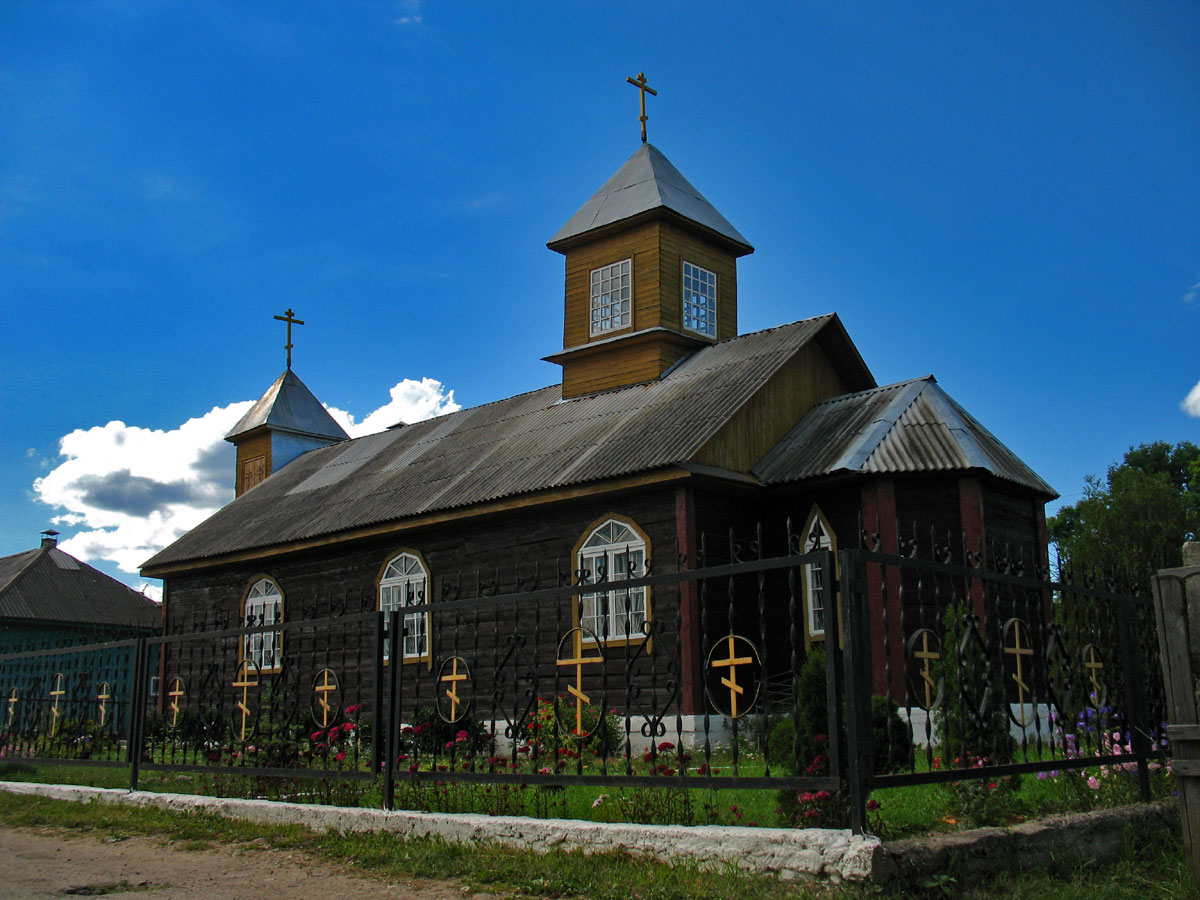

- Location within Belarus
- Coordinates: 54°25′N 27°50′E
- Country: Belarus
- Region: Minsk Region
- District: Lahoysk District

Area
  - Total: 7.7941 km^{2} (3.0093 sq mi)
- Elevation: 211 m (692 ft)

Population (2026)
  - Total: 5,779
- Time zone: UTC+3 (MSK)

Plyeshchanitsy (Belarusian: Плешчаніцы, romanized: Plieščanicy; Russian: Плещеницы, romanized: Pleshchenitsy) is an urban-type settlement in Lahoysk District, Minsk Region, Belarus. It is located about 60 kilometres (37 mi) to the north of Minsk. As of 2026, it has a population of 5,779.

== Nature ==
Plyeshchanitsy has an elevation of 211 m (692 ft) above sea level. The topography of the surrounding area is relatively flat and sparsely populated.

== Population ==
It had a population of 5,835 (2016); 5,911 (2023); 5,882 (2024); 5,845 (2025); 5,779 (2026).
