= Hans Woellke =

German shot putter (1911–1943)

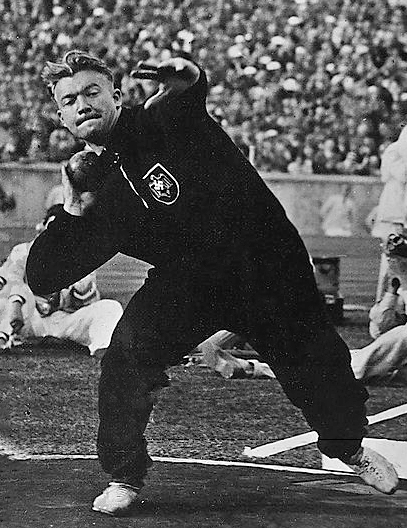
- Woellke at the 1936 Olympics

Personal information
- Born: 18 February 1911 Bischofsburg, East Prussia, Kingdom of Prussia German Empire
- Died: 22 March 1943 (aged 32) near Khatyn, Byelorussian SSR, Soviet Union (now Belarus)
- Height: 178 cm (5 ft 10 in)
- Weight: 105 kg (231 lb)

Sport
- Sport: Athletics
- Event: Shot put
- Club: PSV Berlin

Achievements and titles
- Personal best: 16.60 m (1936)
Medal record
Men's athletics
Representing Germany
Olympic Games
Gold medal – first place	1936 Berlin	Shot put
European Championships
Bronze medal – third place	1938 Paris	Shot put

Hans-Otto Woellke (18 February 1911 – 22 March 1943) was a Nazi German shot putter, who won a gold medal at the 1936 Summer Olympics.

== Biography ==
Woellke won the British AAA Championships title in the shot put event at the 1937 AAA Championships. He won a bronze medal at the 1938 European Championships.

Woellke served with the Order Police. During World War II, he was a captain in the Schutzmannschaft Battalion 118 and served as a company commander. He was killed by partisans on 22 March 1943 near Khatyn village, after which a retaliatory mass killing of civilians took place, committed by the men from Woellke's company and a company of SS-Sonderbataillon Dirlewanger.
