= Operation Cottbus =

Military operation

- Part of World War II
Date	20 May – 24 June 1943
Location	Vitebsk Oblast, Belarus
Result	Estimated at least 20,000 victims at the cost of 59 German troops KIA

Operation Cottbus was an anti-partisan operation during the occupation of Belarus by Nazi Germany. The operation began on 20 May 1943 during the World War II occupation of northern Belarus in the areas of Begoml, Lepel and Ushachy. A number of Belarusian, Latvian, Lithuanian, and Ukrainian collaborationist units took part in the operation, along with the SS Special Battalion Dirlewanger.

Numerous villages were depopulated and burned as part of the operation. The officially communicated result of the operation was that about 9,800 people had been killed (6,087 killed in battle and 3,709 executed) and 4,997 men, but only 1,056 women, had been collected as forced labour. These figures are likely to be underestimates of the dead. German radio reported 15,000 dead, although Dirlewanger's battalion alone reported enemy losses as about 14,000 dead, although this report does not refer to the whole operation. Taking into account that another two combat groups took part in the operation the likely number of dead during the operation is estimated to have been at least 20,000.

It is likely that the majority of those killed were unarmed civilians. Contemporary German reports described the dead as members of "Banden" (Gangs), although later in the report doubt is expressed as to the accuracy of these figures, with the assumption that "numerous peasants" must have been among the dead and noting that "Dirlewanger especially has a reputation for destroying many human lives". The same report indicates that there were 59 German dead. About 950 weapons were captured during the operation.
