= Lahoysk =

Town in Minsk Region, Belarus

Lahoysk Лагойск (Belarusian) Логойск (Russian) Logoysk
- Town
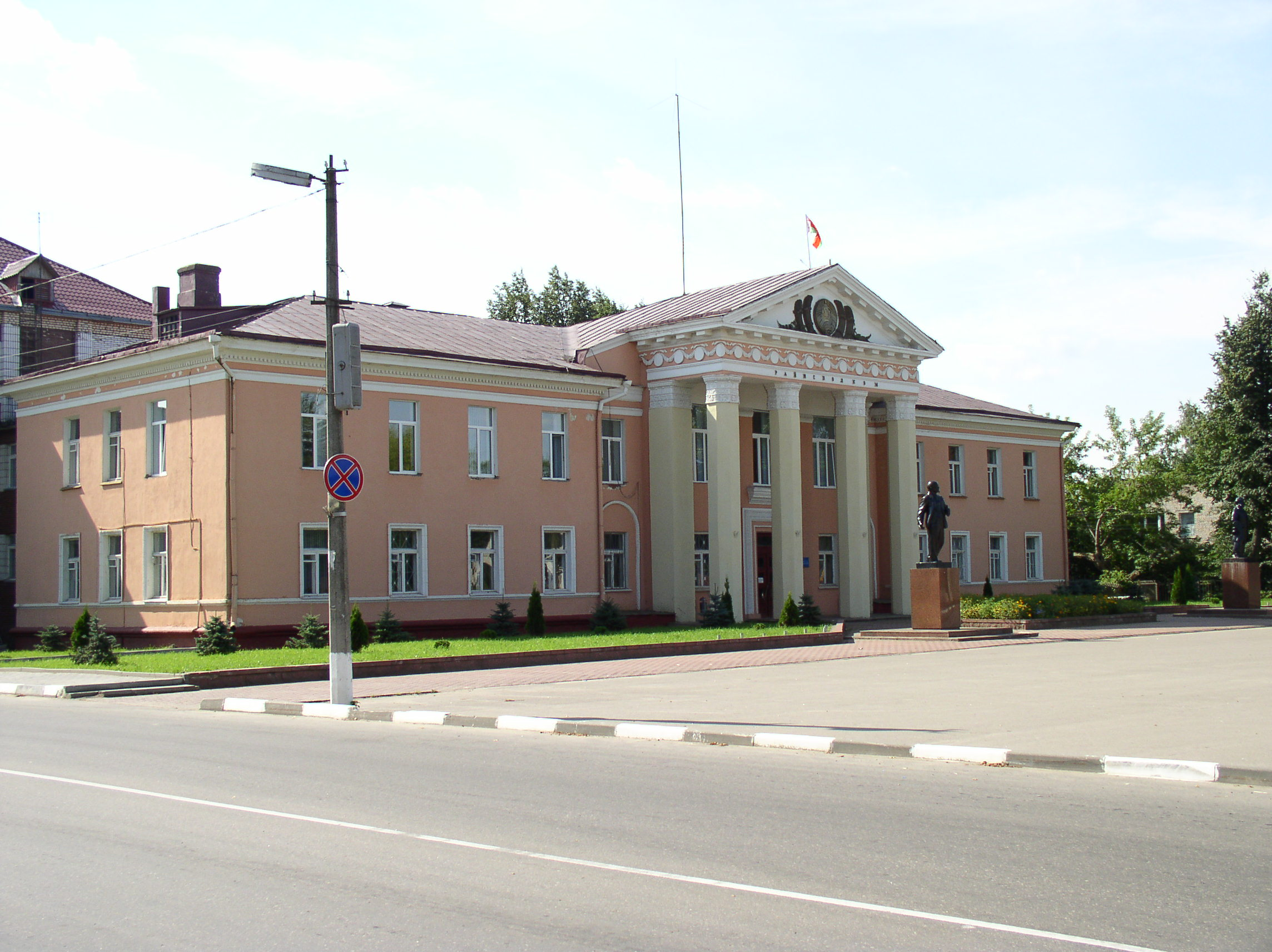

- Coat of arms

- Location within Belarus
- Coordinates: 54°12′N 27°51′E
- Country: Belarus
- Region: Minsk Region
- District: Lahoysk District
- Founded: 1078

Population (2026)
  - Total: 15,543
- Time zone: UTC+3 (MSK)
- Postal Code: 223141
- Area code: +375 17 74
- Website: logoysk.gov.by

Lahoysk (Note: Belarusian: Лагойск, romanized: Lagojsk, IPA: [ɫʌˈɣɔɪsk]; Russian: Логойск, romanized: Logoysk; Polish: Łohojsk.) is a town in Minsk Region, Belarus. It serves as the administrative center of Lahoysk District. As of 2026, it has a population of 15,543.

== History ==
=== Early history ===
Tyshkevich castle, picture by Napoleon Orda

First chronicled in 1078, Lahoysk was the centre of a small 12th-century principality, later absorbed into the Principality of Polotsk. In the 18th and 19th centuries, it was a seat of the Tyszkiewicz family.

In the 12th century, it became the centre of its own duchy, the Duchy of Logozhsk. From the 13th century, it was part of the Grand Duchy of Lithuania. Under the name Logosko, it was mentioned in the List of Russian Cities, Near and Far.

In different periods it came into the possession of Jagiello, Skirgaila, Vytautas and Czartoryski princes as well as of the Tyszkiewicz counts.

In 1505, in the war against the Crimean Khanate, the town was captured by the Tatars, plundered and burned. During the Northern War of 1700–1721 it was captured by Swedish forces. At the same time the Castle of Lahoysk was destroyed. In 1765 a Basilian monastery was built there.

=== Russian Empire ===
As a result of the Second Partition of Poland in 1793, the town became part of the Russian Empire. In 1814–1819, the Tyszkiewicz family built a palace at Lahoysk, which was destroyed during the Second World War. According to some data, in 1842 brothers Konstanty and Eustachy Tyszkiewicz established an archaeological museum in Lahoysk. Its collection has served as the basis for the creation in 1855 of the Wilnius Archaeological Museum. In 1897, Lahoysk became the centre of a parish in the Barysau uyezd.

In 1890, the town had 1,180 inhabitants, most of them Jews (685 persons). There was a synagogue, an Orthodox church and a Catholic church in the town.

=== Soviet period ===
In 1918, Lahoysk became part of the Belarusian Democratic Republic and later of the Belarusian Soviet Socialist Republic, which was incorporated into the Soviet Union in 1922.

Since 1924, Lahoysk has been the centre of Lahoysk District.

In September 1941, during World War II, 920 Jews were killed by Einsatzgruppen and the 2nd SS Panzer Division Das Reich, and was described as "Jew Free".

=== Independent Belarus ===
In 1998, it was given the status of a city.

== Places of interest ==
=== St. Nikolai Orthodox Church ===
Today, an increasing number of tourists come to visit St. Nicholai Church, because this is one of the few remaining churches on the European territory painted in the Apocalypse style, using the art of painting on freshly spread moist lime plaster with waterbased pigments (fresco painting).

St. Nicholai Church is an Orthodox church located in the central part of the city Logoisk (Belarus) on the right side of the Gaina river . Built in 1862, it can accommodate up to 700 people. In 2017 the abbot is the father of Vladimir Zimnitsky.

The church is built of stone. It has the shape of a rectangle with an open dome and bell tower in the middle of the gable.

The first mention of the church was in 1653. Overall, in its history, St. Nicholai Church was restored four times: in 1734, 1795, 1824 and 1866.

In 1866, the church built on the site of the ancient church Prechistenskaya. In 1907 the ancient icon of Our Lady, considered lost, was returned to the St. Nicholai Church .

At the end of 1920 the church was closed; it housed a grain warehouse. In 1941 the church was re-opened. In the 1980s, St. Nicholai Church walls were painted by master painters from Sergiev Posad.

St. Nicholas painted the story Apocalypse, its altar – on the theme of the Lord's supper. Among the many well-executed images have all Belarusian saints. The second chapel (located in the north, the left of the main chapel, the side of the church) was consecrated in honor of St. Symeon the New Theologian.

St. Nikolai Orthodox Church

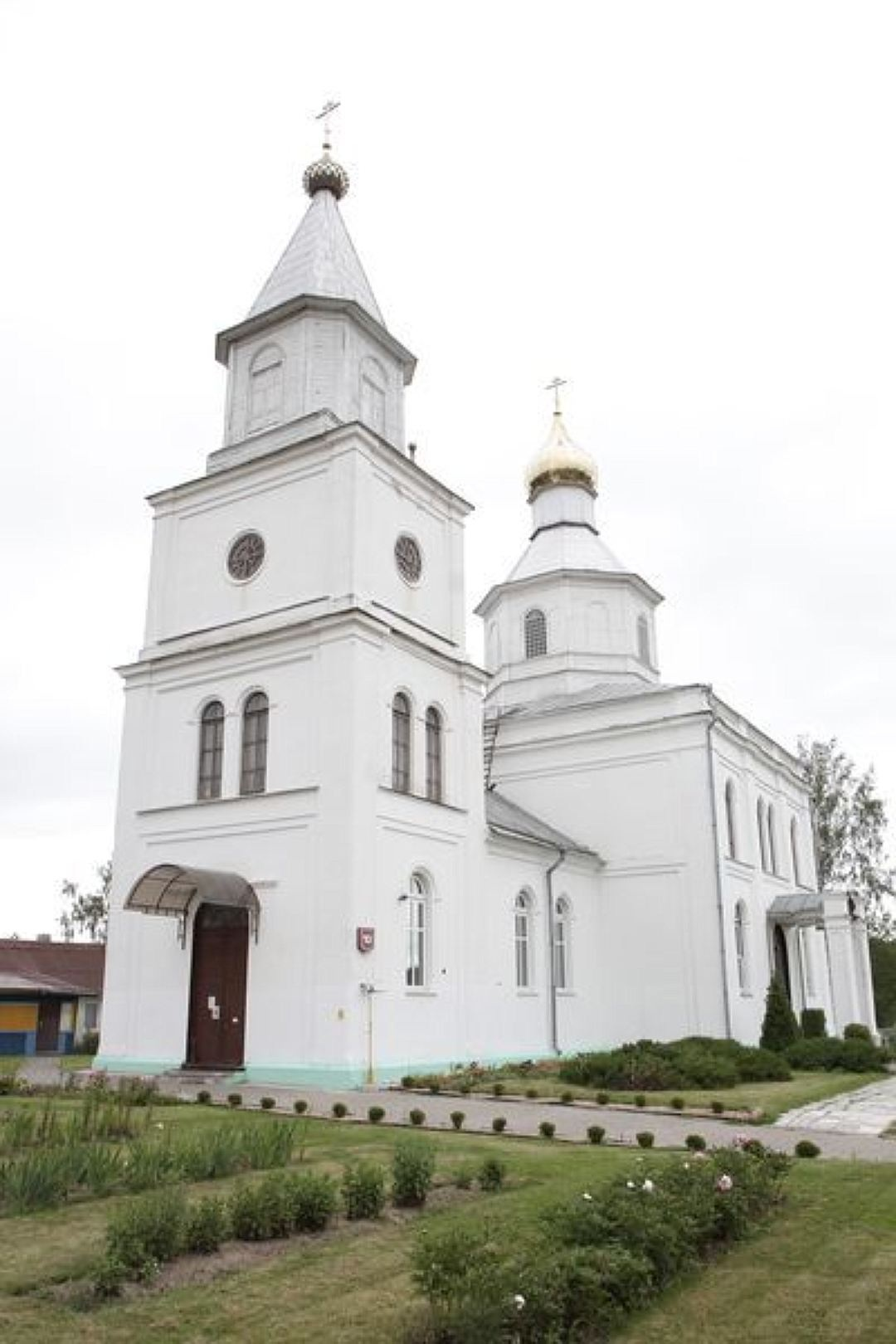

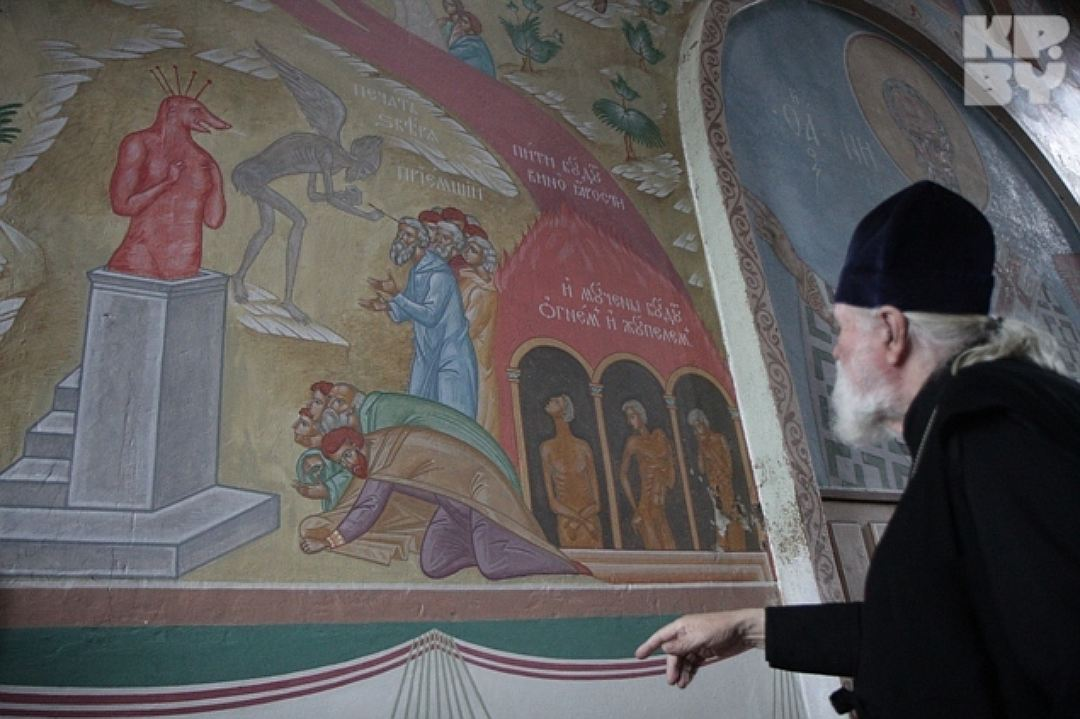

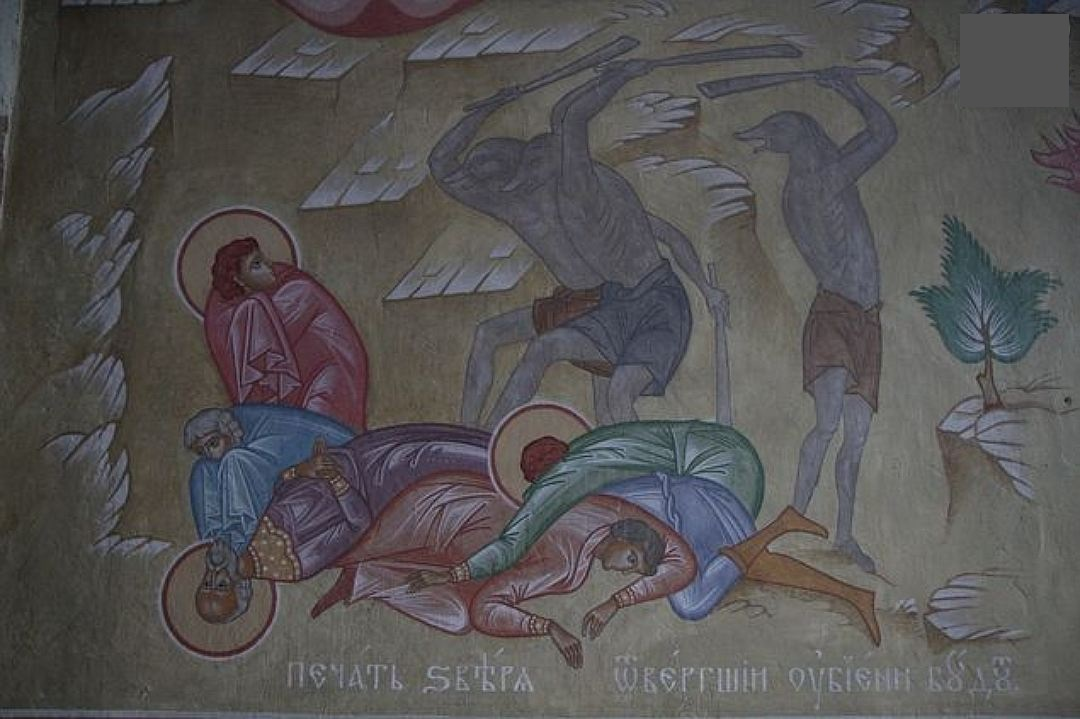

=== St. Kazimir Catholic Church ===
St. Kazimir Catholic Church is a Catholic church, located in the city of Logoisk, Belarus. It was built in 1999 by the architect M. Kalechits. It is located in the central part of Logoisk, on the left side of the river Gaina. The building is a light beige color with a modern silhouette, which features Gothic Revival traced.

The church was built on the site of the destroyed in the mid-20th-century St. Kazimir Catholic Church, which was located on the former site of the tomb of the Tyshkevich family. Near the church is the grave of Count K. Tyshkevich, where the installed the monument.

St. Kazimir Catholic Church during the four centuries of its history was erected four times. The church was founded in 1604 by Count Alexander Tyshkevich as a sign of his conversion to the Catholic faith. The wooden church burned down in 1655 during the war of 1654–1667 between Rzeczpospolita and the Russian kingdom.

On 17 April 1787 Count A. Tyshkevich took up the construction of the stone church, whose construction was completed on 20 October 1793 by his son Vikenty. The church functioned until 1950; then it was closed and dismantled. In the late 1980s, believers established a cross on the former site of the shrine and began to seek permission to build the church.

In 1991, the city authorities decided to transfer these lands of the Roman Catholic Church. The new church was built in less than 10 years ago. The rebuilt church was consecrated on 19 June 1999.

St. Kazimir Catholic Church

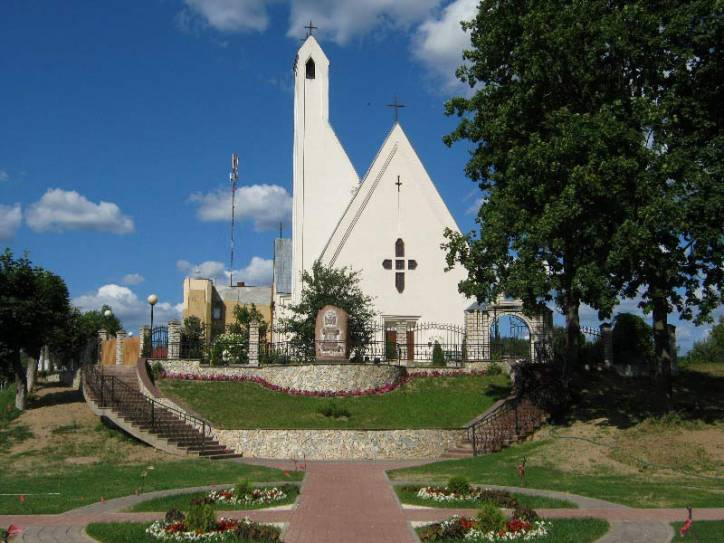

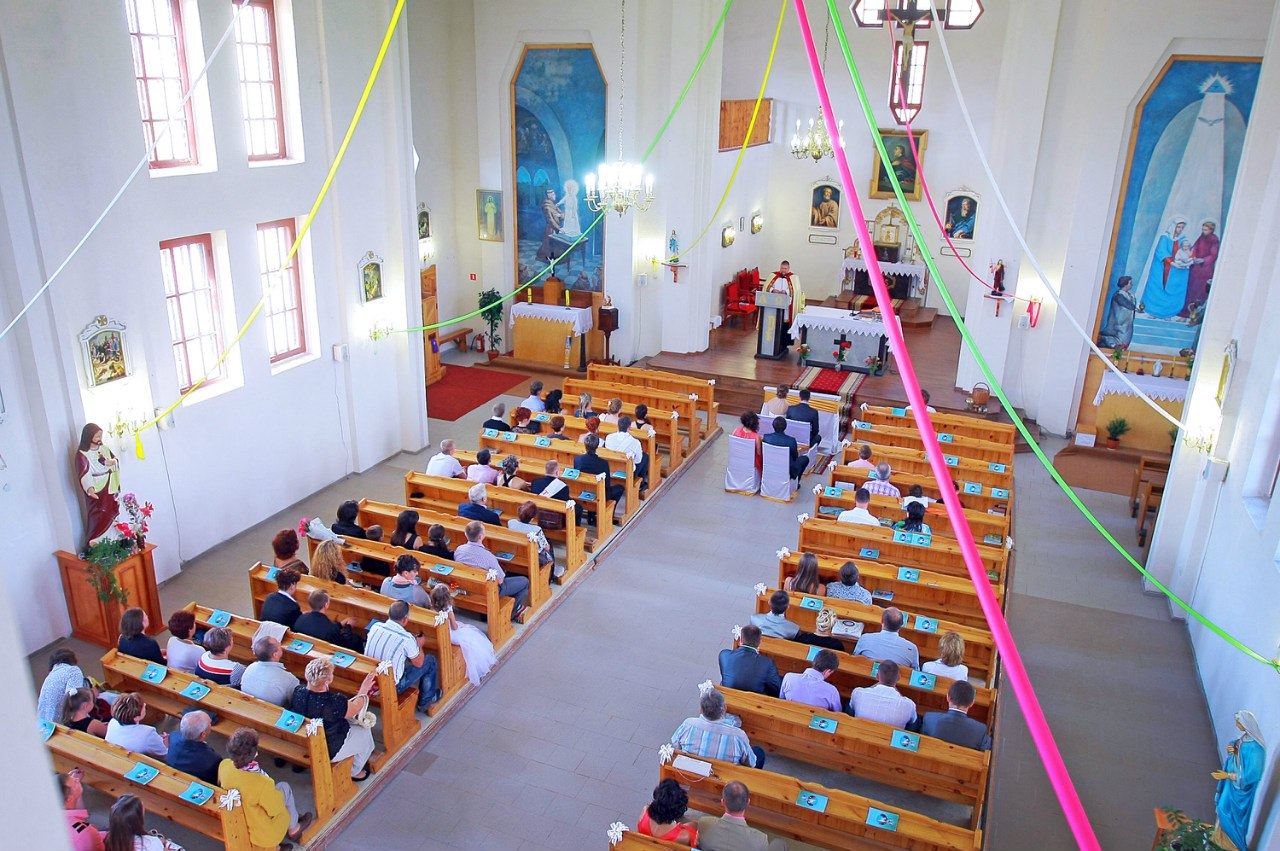

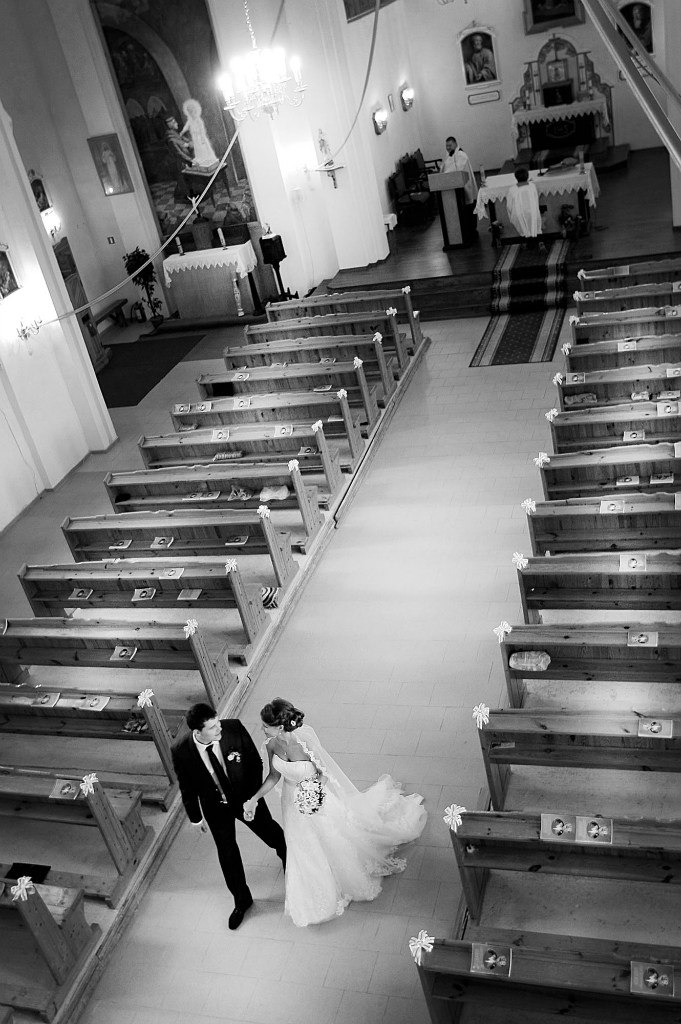

=== Holy spring of St. Nicholai (Crinitsa) ===
The spring of St. Nicholai in Logoisk is one of the city's attractions. It is located near the Church of St. Nicholai, from under which originates and source. Crinitsa has been declared to be a hydrological natural monument of local importance. In 2005, the source by Consecrated Metropolitan of Minsk and Slutsk Filaret.

It is believed that the water from this holy spring healing, heal many ailments. Crinitsa and the surrounding area equipped, built two fonts. Place attracts many pilgrims and travelers to try the spring water, and if possible to find cure of diseases.

Holy spring of St. Nicholai (Crinitsa)

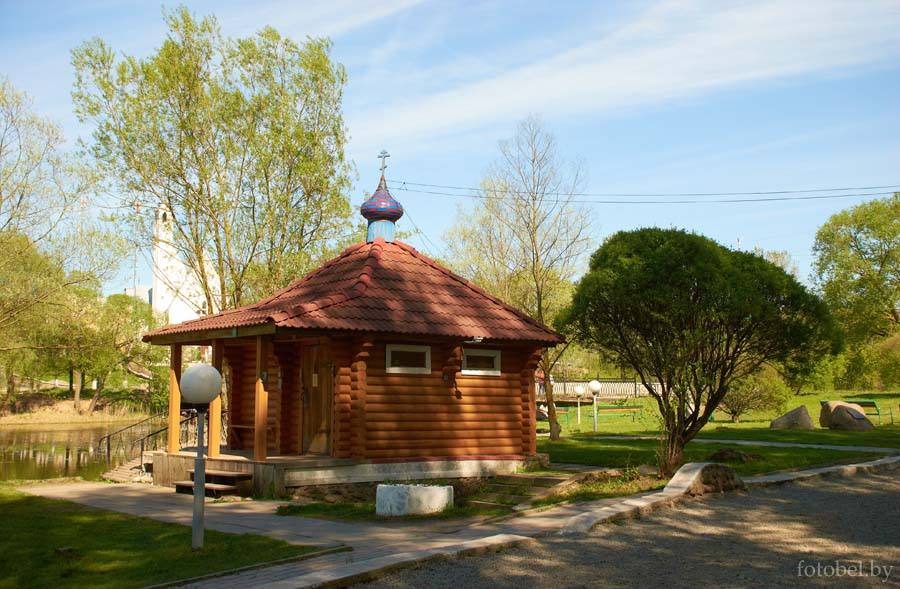

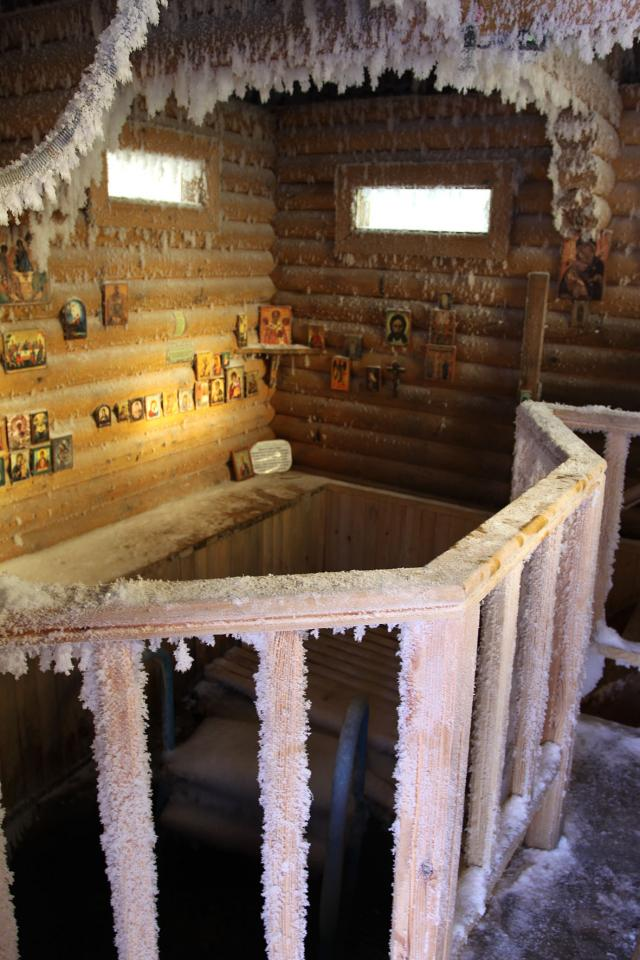

=== Tyshkevich palace ===
Tyshkevich Palace in Logoisk is an architectural monument of late classicism (Empire). Most of the palace, as well as farm buildings almost completely destroyed and the chapel at the end of World War II by the retreating Germans. The ruins of the walls of the side wing of the palace and well known Tyshkevich's park.

The monumental structure was raised on a high base of rectangular shape (70 × 20 m). In the courtyard of the estate were "the hut" ledovnya (refrigirator-building), congestive, stable box and other outbuildings.

All parts of the palace were covered with gable roofs. Ceremonial palace museum apartment resembled a suite. Here in 2 huge oblong halls were presented things from the rich museum collection. The decoration of the interiors has been made in the Empire style. It is assumed that these rooms are on the 1st floor of the side wing of the palace.

Its a story, that Tyshkevich's castle and St. Kazimir Catholic Church was connected with underground road.

Tyshkevich's castle

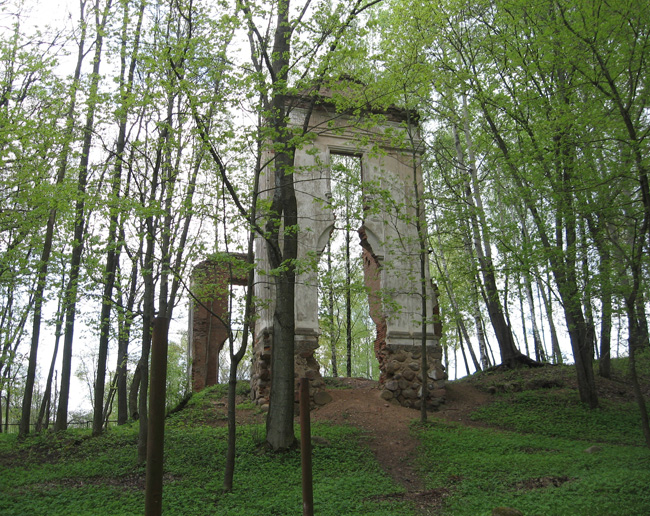

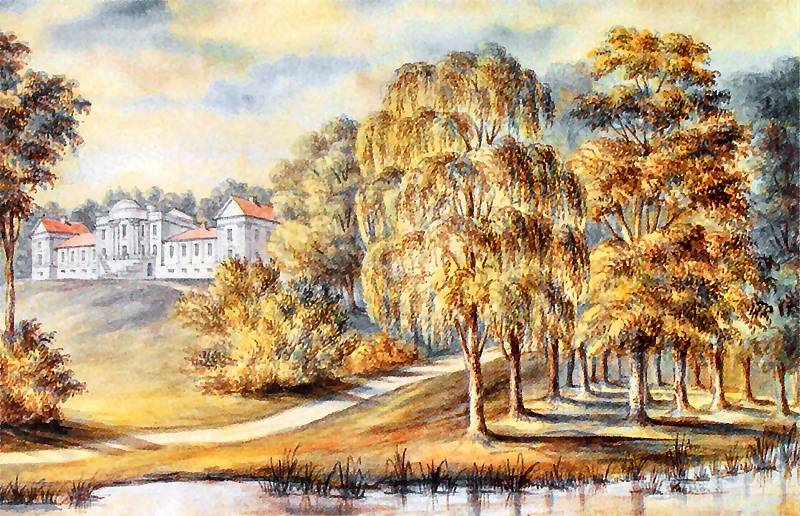

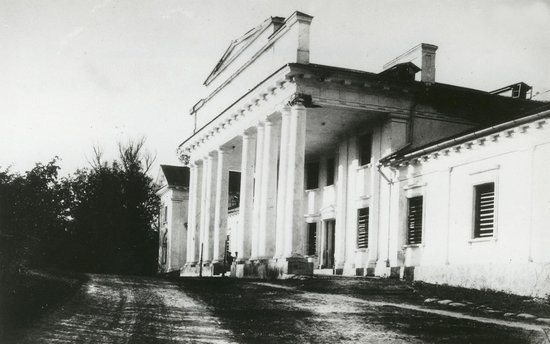

=== Sculpture 'The Mother of God in Logoisk' ===
On 24 September 2016, the sculpture 'The Mother of God in Logoisk' (the author is Vladimir Slobodchikov, who currently lives in Silichy village) was installed and blessed in Logoisk.

According to the bishop who blessed the monument, it is now possible to come for help and consolation, or in a moments of joy.

Sculpture 'The Mother of God in Logoisk'

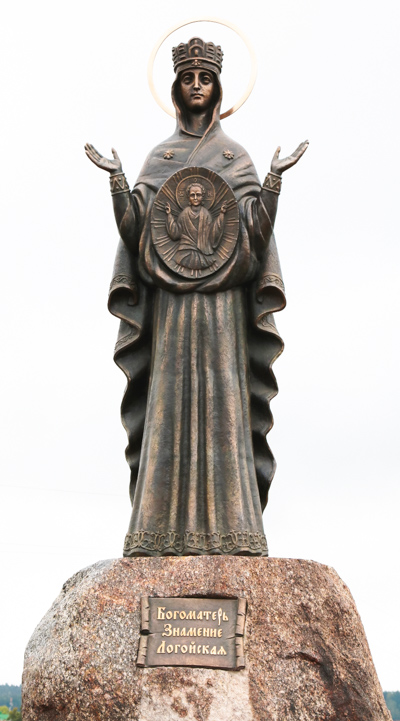

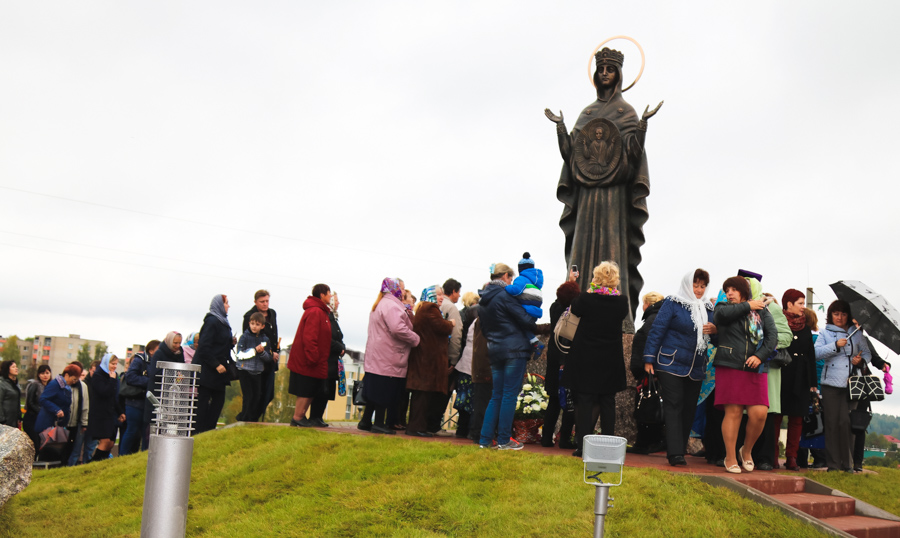

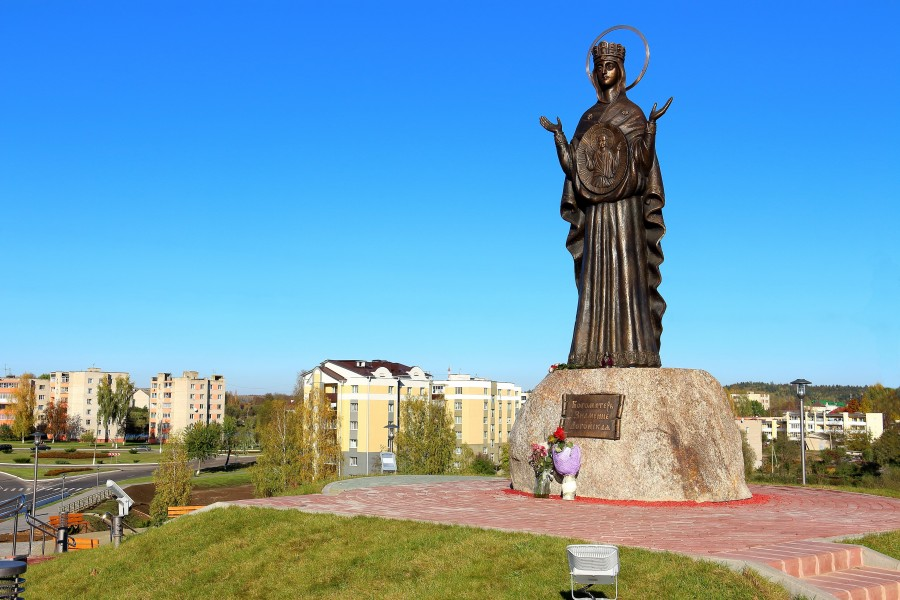

== Notable people ==
- Eustachy Tyszkiewicz (1814 – 1873), government official, archaeologist and historian
- Uładzimir Hančaryk (born 1940), candidate in the 2001 presidential election.

== See also ==
- Silichy, a ski resort near Lahoysk
