= Lahoysk district =

District of Minsk region, Belarus

Lahoysk district Лагойскі раён (Belarusian) Логойский район (Russian)
- District
- Coat of arms

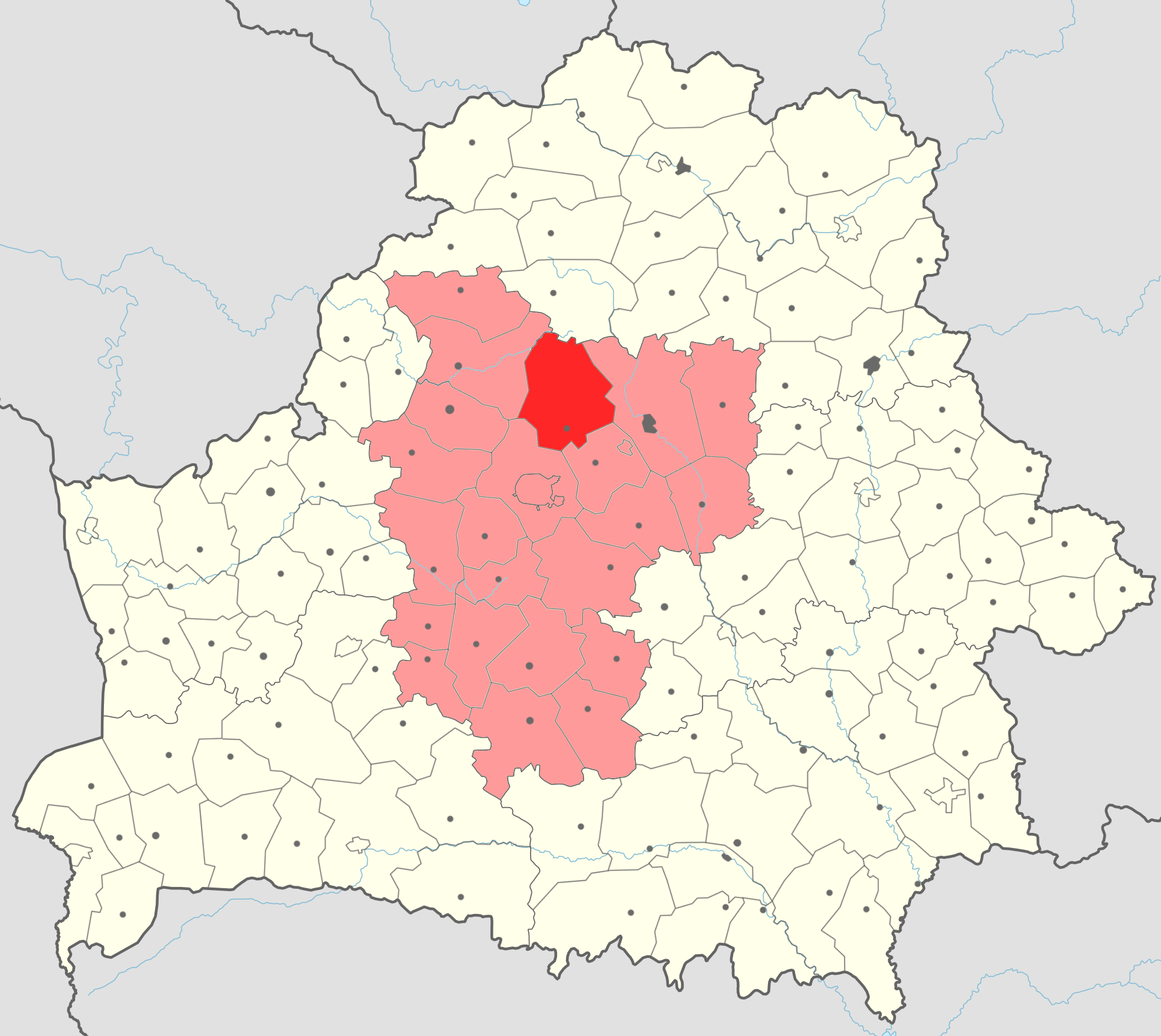
- Coordinates: 54°12′N 27°51′E
- Country: Belarus
- Region: Minsk region
- Administrative center: Lahoysk

Area
  - District: 2,365 km^{2} (913 sq mi)

Population (2024)
  - District: 38,519
  - Density: 16.29/km^{2} (42.18/sq mi)
  - Urban: 21,447
  - Rural: 17,072
- Time zone: UTC+3 (MSK)
- Website: Lahoysk District administration website

Lahoysk district or Lahojsk district (Belarusian: Лагойскі раён, IPA: [lʌˈɣɔɪskɪ rʌɪon]; Russian: Логойский район) is a district (raion) of Minsk region in Belarus. Its administrative center is the city of Lahoysk. As of 2024, it has a population of 38,519.

== Notable residents ==
- Źmitrok Biadula (1886, Pasadžec village – 1941), Belarusian Jewish writer
- Nil Hilevich (1931, Slabada village – 2016), Belarusian poet

== See also ==
- Khatyn massacre
