= Jan Kazimierz Wilczyński =

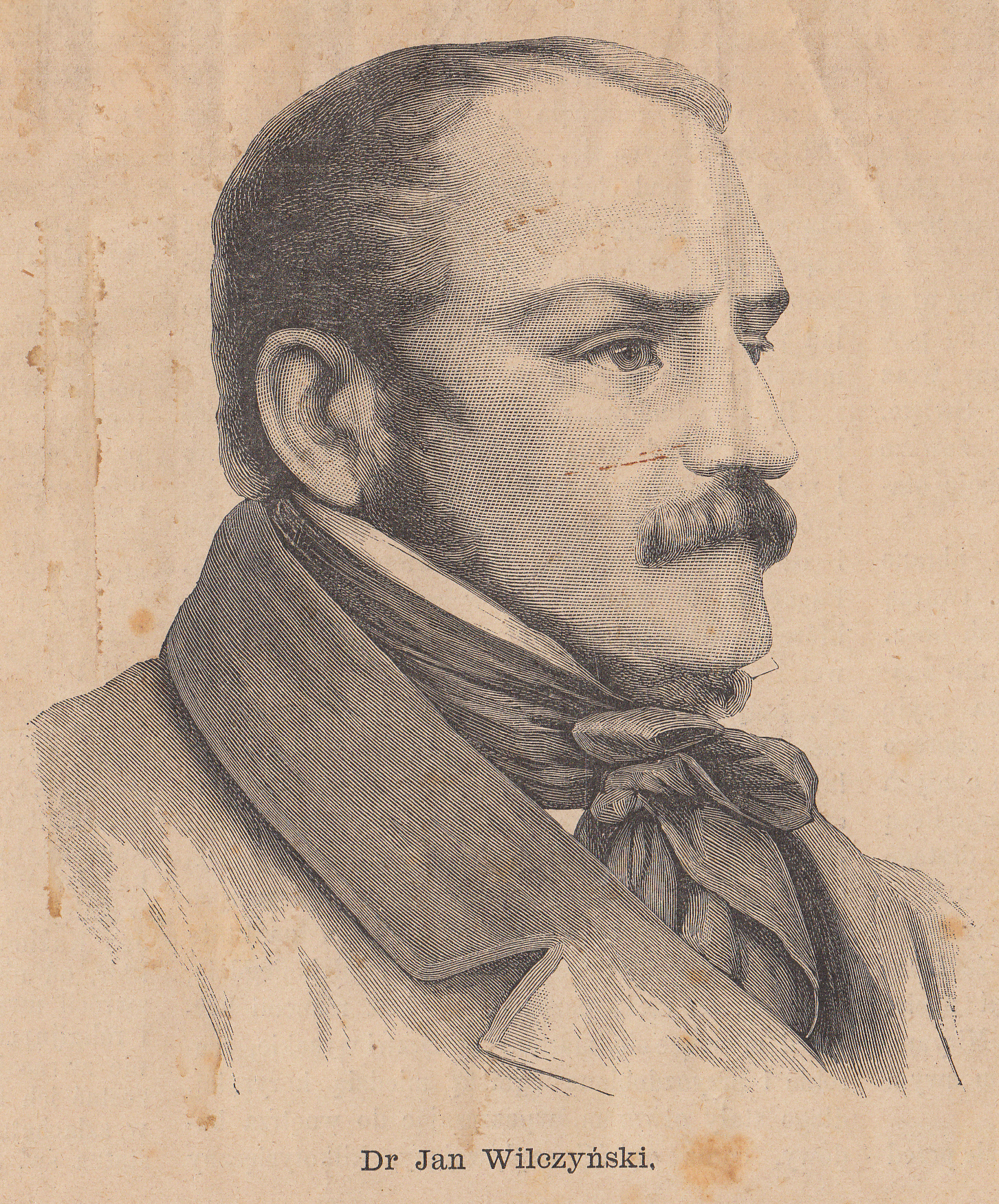
Jan Kazimierz Wilczyński, a portrait, published in Polish press in the late 1800s.

Jan Kazimierz Wilczyński (Lithuanian: Jonas Kazys/Kazimieras Vilčinskas; 6 February 1806 – 2 March 1885) was a Polish-Lithuanian medical doctor, collector and publisher. He is famous for publishing the Album Wileńskie (English: Vilnius Album), which is the greatest monument of 19th-century Polish and Lithuanian graphics.

== Biography ==
Jan Kazimierz Wilczyński was born in Jasonys near Utena, Aukštaitija region of ethnographic Lithuania, as a son of Zygmunt Wilczyński and Tekla Römer, daughter of Franciszek Römer treasurer of Trakai. He had two brothers Ludwik and Franciszek, and two sisters Barbara and Józefa. Ludwik took an active part in the November Uprising, for which his property was confiscated. Franciszek, on the other hand, was occupied with running the farm.

He studied in the Troškūnai Gymnasium. According to the information published in 1908 by his nephew, historian and archaeologist Algirdas Vilčinskas (Vilčinskis), who lived in his uncle's home, Jan Kazimierz Wilczyński spoke exclusively Lithuanian at home. Wilczyński was a true patriot of his country and spoke Lithuanian not only with his family members but also in public. He was interested in his country's history and he started collecting artworks related to Lithuania's past, such as the works of Franciszek Smuglewicz, Walenty Wańkowicz, Jan Rustem and other prominent artists, already as a student.

After studying physics, mathematics and medicine in Vilnius University in 1824–27, he continued studying in Paris in 1829–31. From 1831 to 1835, he worked as a doctor in Warsaw. Thereafter, he returned to Vilnius in 1835 and continued working as a doctor. From 1836 he belonged to the St. Petersburg Archaeological Society. In 1842, he graduated from the Vilnius Academy of Medicine and Surgery.

About 1844, Wilczyński had the idea of publishing a collection of images of the most famous art monuments from the time of the Grand Duchy of Lithuania, in the attempt to preserve the memory of the decaying or devastated monuments of Polish culture under Russian partition. Initially, he thought of publishing it in Vilnius, but as he was unsatisfied with the quality of the lithographies of the local lithography workshops. Wilczyński transported the album sheets to the Lemercier et Cie lithographic printing house in Paris, which was a very experienced publisher. The album was released in a series of separate notebooks in which the publisher put together 353 sheets of graphics over 40 years of continuous work. The album consists of 364 lithographies, chromolithographies and carvings. The first notebook of the album released by Wilczyński was mostly related to Vilnius, its architecture and surroundings. While planning the second and other notebooks, Wilczyński expanded the publication's subject matter and included the events of the ancient history of Lithuania and Poland, portraits of famous historical figures, contemporaries of the publisher - artists, sponsors, subscribers. In addition, after the Imperial Russian Government closed the Catholic churches and monasteries after the uprisings of 1831 and 1863, Wilczyński sought to keep their beauty immortalized in the album.

Lithographies from the Vilnius album

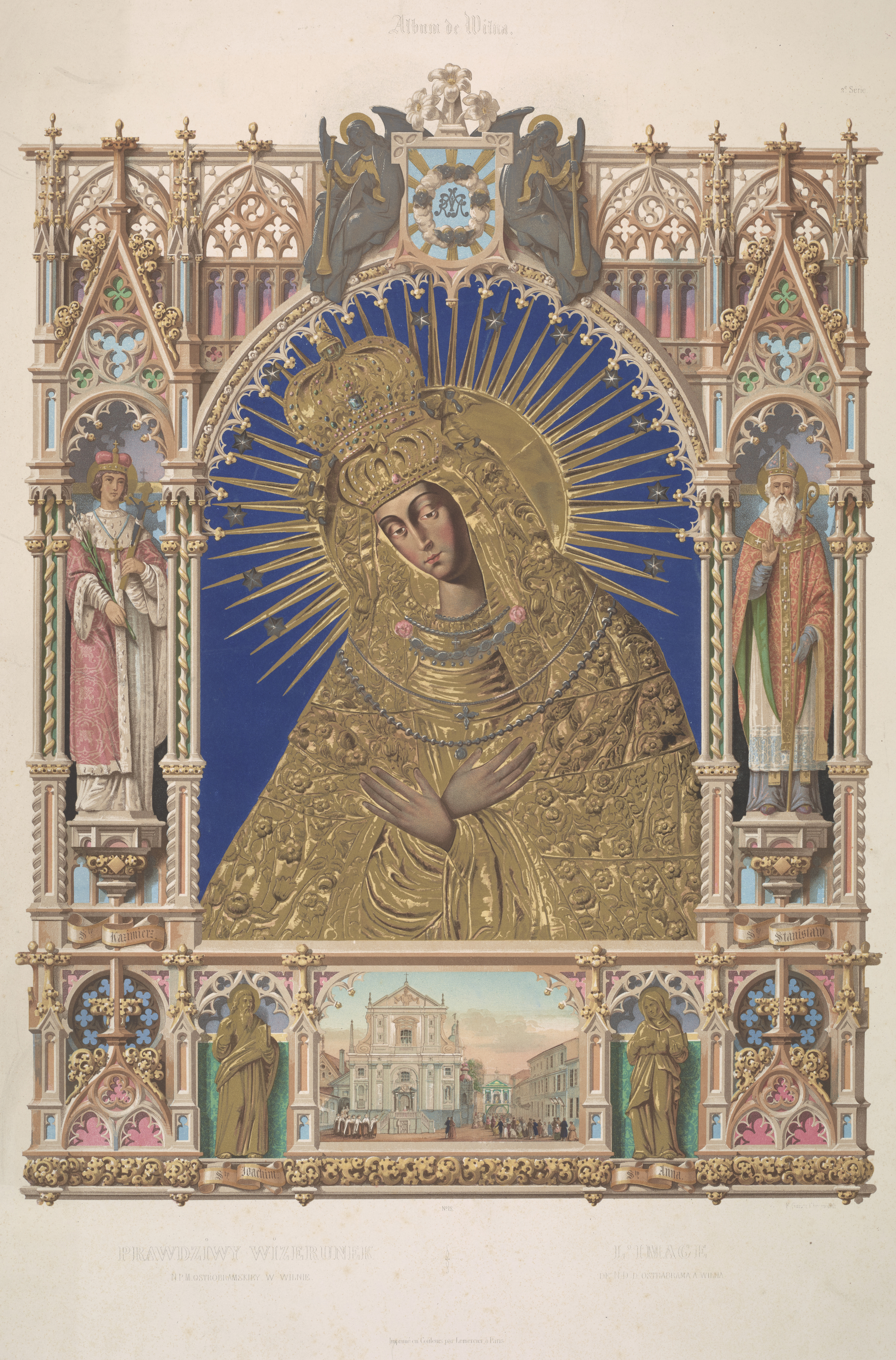
Our Lady of the Gate of Dawn as depicted in the Vilnius Album

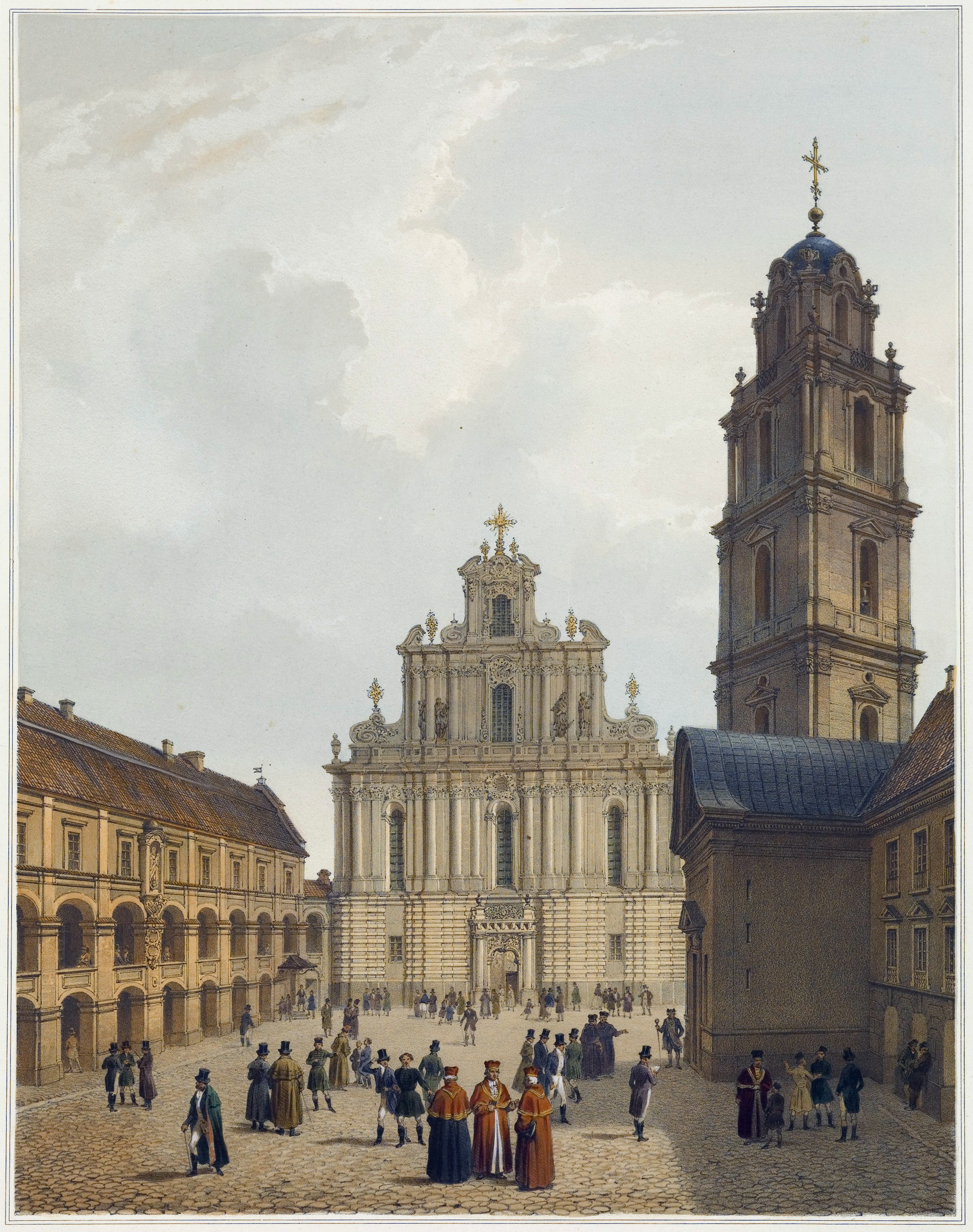
The Church of St. Johns and the Great Courtyard of Vilnius University

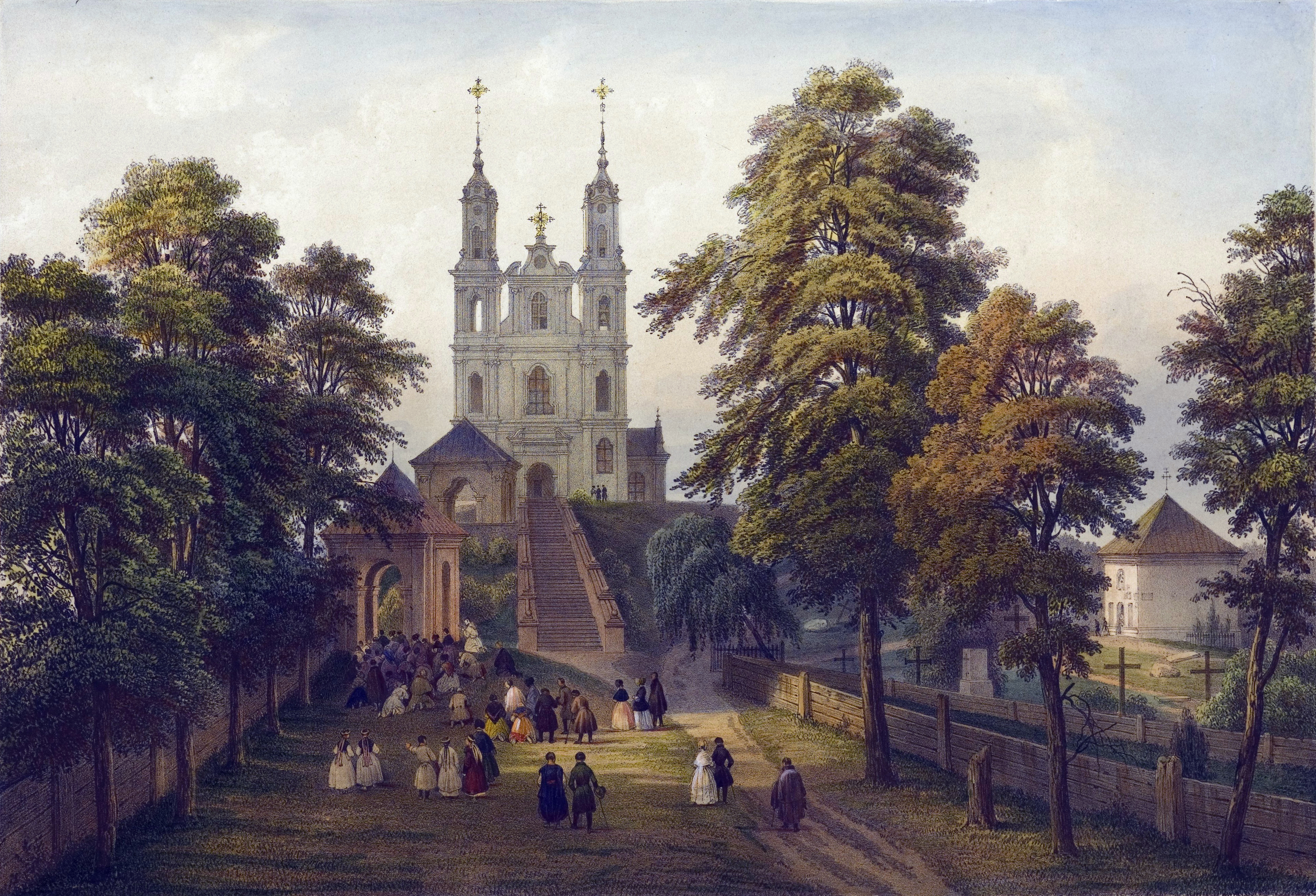
Church of the Discovery of the Holy Cross, Vilnius

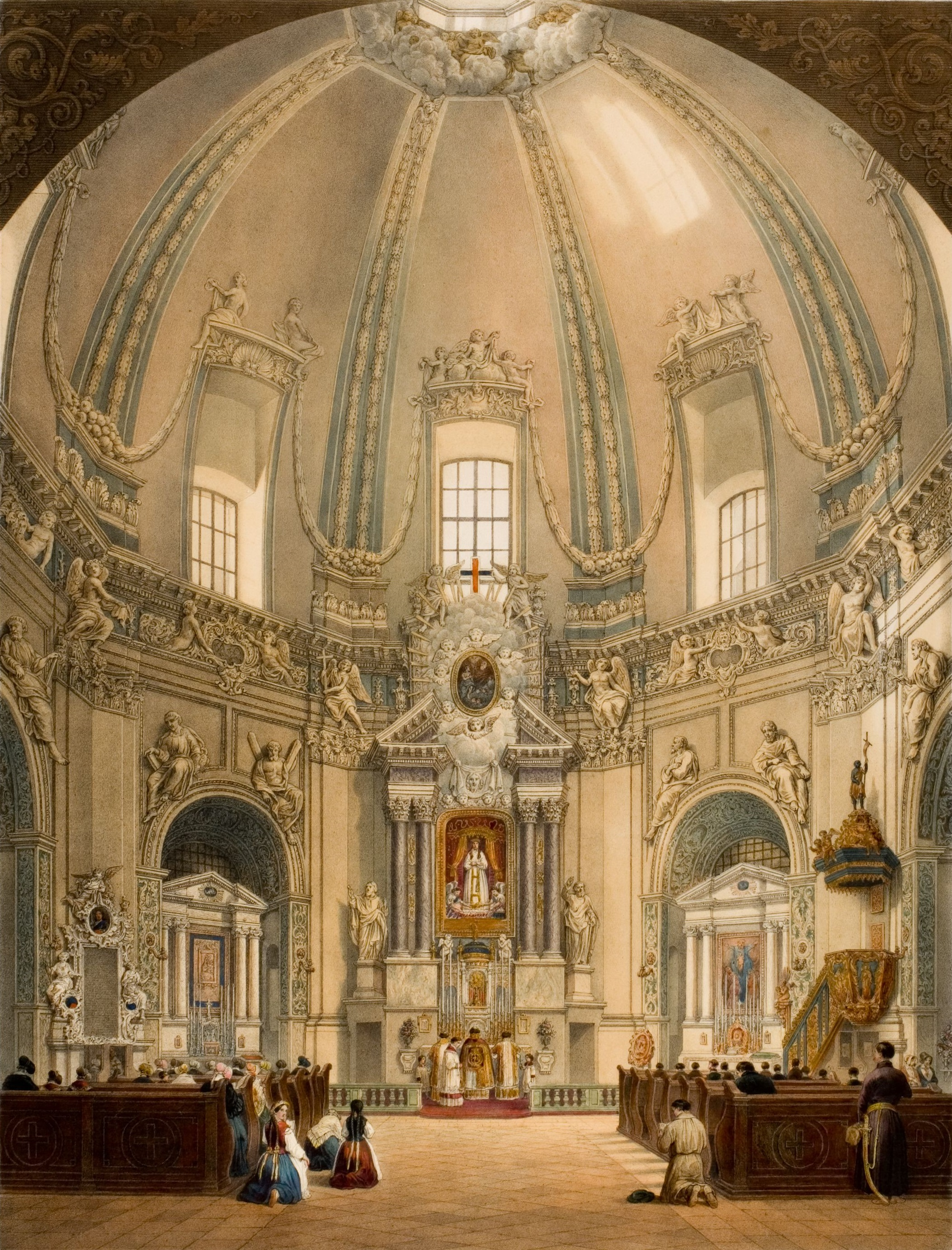
Church of Jesus the Redeemer, Vilnius in 1847

From 1856, he belonged to the Vilnius Provisional Archaeological Commission and worked for some time at the Museum of Antiquities in Vilnius. He collected artworks, took care of the protection of Lithuanian cultural monuments, and wrote about art and culture. The Vilnius Archaeological Commission, established on 11 April 1855, brought together more than a few hundred people interested in the country's history. Due to the efforts of Eustachy and Konstanty Tyszkiewicz, Adam Kirkor, Adam Alfred Plater, Władysław Syrokomla, Wilczyński and others, the Tsarist government allowed the Museum of Antiquities to open on the premises of the Vilnius University that was closed due to the Uprising of 1831. This museum was the first institution of its kind in Lithuania. Lithuanian patriots donated personal collections to the museum and organized archeological expeditions in various areas of the former Grand Duchy of Lithuania at their own expense. Admiring the educational activities of his contemporaries and colleagues, Wilczyński dedicated several sheets of the Vilnius Album to that: a portrait of Eustachy Tyszkiewicz and an image of the Archaeological Hall of the Vilnius Museum of Antiquities were published on the occasion of the museum's opening.

To promote this institution, Wilczyński released the album Musée Archéologique à Wilno in 1858–1859 for the Museum of Antiquities with graphic reproductions of archeological and historical exhibits and artworks. Simultaneously, Wilczyński also worked on the representative "Armorial of Ancient Nobles" published in Paris, which consisted of 18 chromolithographs with the coats of arms of famous Lithuanian noble families. The title page of this publication is an ornate Coat of arms of Lithuania.

He travelled extensively in connection with his publishing work. He made numerous trips to Kiev in 1849, 1850, 1852 and 1853. In 1851, he went to Warsaw and Częstochowa. In 1853 he again lived in Warsaw for several weeks. In 1852 he spent a long time in Samogitia. When the police supervision was removed, he was able to go abroad to Paris, where he stayed from June to October 1853, in 1859 and 1860. The last time he went to Paris was in 1864, just before the outbreak of the Franco-Prussian War.

Wilczyński lived in Vilnius until his death in 1885.

== Publications ==
From 1846 he published (printed in Paris, London) the Vilnius Album at his own expense (Album Wileńskie, in French edition Album de Wilna), and also published the Kyiv album (Album Kijowskie, 1850–57) and the Warsaw album (Album Warszawskie, 1851).

The Vilnius Album consists of more than 350 lithographs, chromolithographs, copper, steel engravings created by the most famous French masters of that period based on the works of Jan Chrucki, Kanuty Rusiecki, Karol Rypiński, Albert Żamett and other Polish-Lithuanian artists (including Wilczyński himself). It also includes monuments of Vilnius architecture, fine arts and famous people.

In 1858 he started publishing Herbarz starodawnej szlachty podług heraldyków polskich z dopełnieniem do czasów obecnych ("Amorial of the ancient nobility according to Polish heraldists with an addition to the present day") and the album Muzeum Archeologiczne w Wilnie ("Vilnius Archaeological Museum", 1858–59). He also published Michał Tyszkiewicz book Podróż do Egiptu i Nubii (Journey to Egypt and Nubia, 1863), and Józef Ignacy Kraszewski's book Wspomnienia z Wołynia, Polesia i Litwy ("Memoirs of Polesia, Volhynia and Lithuania", 1860).

He has also produced a number of smaller publications like Ołtarzyk Ostrobramski ("Altar of the Gate of Dawn", 1853) with the introduction of Józef Ignacy Kraszewski, or illustrations to humorous texts by Arthur Barthels: Łapigrosze, Pan Eugeniusz, Pan Atanazy Skorupa (1858-59).

== Death ==
He died in Vilnius on 7 March 1885 and is buried at the Rasos Cemetery. His tombstone was renovated in the 1920s due to the efforts of Lithuanian Poles.

== Bibliography ==
- Urbonienė, Regina (2010). Mukienė, Danutė (ed.). "LDM Vilniaus paveikslų galerijoje – Jono Kazimiero Vilčinskio leidinių paroda" (PDF). Lietuvos Istorijos Metraštis (in Lithuanian). 13. Lietuvos dailės muziejus. Archived from the original (PDF) on 18 November 2020.
- Jaworska, Jadwiga (1972). "Album Wileńskie i jego wydawca Jan Kazimierz Wilczyński w świetle korespondencji z Konstantym Świdzińskim". Rocznik Muzeum Narodowego W Warszawie. 16.
