= Museum of Antiquities in Vilnius =

Museum in Vilnius, Lithuania

Coordinates: 54°40′58″N 25°17′16″E

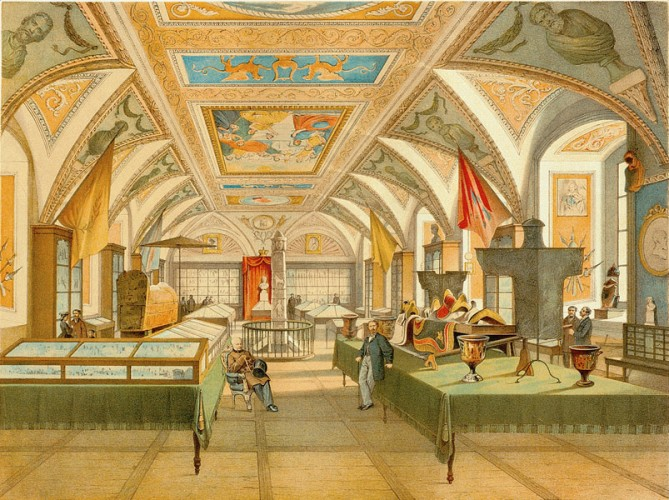
Main hall of the Museum of Antiquities (from an album published by Jan Kazimierz Wilczyński in 1863). Founder Eustachy Tyszkiewicz sits on the left. A copy of the Zbruch Idol stand in the middle.

The Museum of Antiquities (Lithuanian: Senienų muziejus, Polish: Muzeum Starożytności) in Vilnius (Vilna, Wilno) was a museum of archaeology and history established by Count Eustachy Tyszkiewicz in 1855 at the premises of the closed Vilnius University. It was the first public museum in the former Grand Duchy of Lithuania and is considered a predecessor of the National Museum of Lithuania even though only a handful of items from the Museum of Antiquities ended up at the National Museum. Together with the Archaeological Commission which functioned as a de facto learned society, the museum was displayed many historical items of the old Grand Duchy and aligned with the romantic nationalism of Lithuanian nobles at a time when Lithuania was part of the Russian Empire. The museum holdings grew to over 67,000 items in 1865, including minerals and zoological collections from Vilnius University and collections from the libraries of Catholic churches and monasteries.

The museum was nationalized and reorganized after the Uprising of 1863, removing almost all items related to the former Polish–Lithuanian Commonwealth to the Rumyantsev Museum in Moscow. The museum became a division of the newly established Vilnius Public Library. The reformed library and museum served to support the official Russification policies and displayed many items related to the Russian Empire and the Eastern Orthodox Church. After losing the last significant cultural center that supported the culture of the former Grand Duchy of Lithuania, Vilnius was becoming a Russian provincial city and losing its leading role in Polish–Lithuanian cultural life. The museum continued to operate until World War I when its most significant holdings were evacuated to the Rumyantsev Museum. The handful of items that remained in Vilnius and were not lost during the wars are held by various museums, including the National Museum of Lithuania, the Lithuanian Art Museum, and the Geology and Zoology Museums of Vilnius University.

== History ==
=== 1855–1864: center of Polish–Lithuanian culture ===
Number of museum visitors and donors of exhibits The museum was open only on Sundays
Year	Visitors			Donors
Year	Total	Men	Women	Donors
1856 (from April)	7,151			?
1857	11,800	8,559	3,241	?
1858*	4,031	2,940	1,091	195
1859	7,470	5,218	2,252	179
1860	9,048	6,647	2,401	293
1861	6,151	4,790	1,361	259
1862	10,360	8,140	2,220	323
1863	6,884	5,395	1,489	166
1864	7,482	6,054	1,428	136
Total	70,377	47,743	15,483	1,551
* Note: 1858 is missing visitor data for four summer months. For comparison: the population of Vilnius was about 50,000.

Eustachy Tyszkiewicz, an avid collector and an archaeologist, decided to establish a history museum after his trip to Scandinavian countries in 1843. He opened a cabinet of antiquities in his own house in Antakalnis to the public in 1846. In February 1848, Tyszkiewicz petitioned the government proposing to establish a provincial museum and asking for premises and funds. He envisioned a museum with four main sections that would focus both on history and on progress: nature (minerals, plants, animals), antiquity (archaeological artifacts, coins, medals, art objects), library (publications, manuscripts, engravings), and economy (agriculture, equipment models, household items). This plan was rejected. In 1851, Tyszkiewicz promised to donate his collection if the government approved the museum. This time, the proposal was received more favorably but Tsar Nicholas I of Russia demanded detailed plans and preparations. After long bureaucratic delays (for example, Tyszkiewicz's refusal to provide a detailed inventory of the collection that he promised to donate or long discussions between the Ministry of National Education and the Ministry of Internal Affairs on how to handle archives of closed Catholic churches and monasteries), new Tsar Alexander II of Russia approved the museum and the Vilnius Provisional Archaeological Commission on 11 May [O.S. 29 April] 1855. The museum opened with a great ceremony on 29 April [O.S. 17 April] 1856, the birth date of Tsar Alexander II.

The museum opened with a much narrower focus on history and archaeology than originally planned by Tyszkiewicz. The museum was given premises in the former Vilnius University (closed in 1831) – the present-day Hall of Pranciškus Smuglevičius (Franciszek Smuglewicz) of Vilnius University Library. The former assembly hall was restored taking care to clean up and renew paintings and frescoes by Smuglewicz. The museum expanded to the 2nd (former Jesuit library) and 3rd floors (former university cabinet of mineralogy) in 1856–1857. The second floor was tuned into a library and an ornithological museum (basis for which were exhibits collected by Konstanty Tyzenhauz). The third floor inherited more than 10,000 minerals and related items from the former university and became a mineralogy and natural history museum. Though the natural history section was large, it never became the focus of the museum. The museum rapidly increased its collections. Items were donated by history enthusiasts, various societies and organizations. The museum registered 195 donors in 1858 and 323 donors in 1862. The collection grew from initial 6,000 items donated by Eustachy Tyszkiewicz to over 67,000 items by 1865.

In 1858–1862, Jan Kazimierz Wilczyński printed an album Musée Archéologique à Wilno illustrating some of the holdings in the museum: scepter and seal of Vilnius University, portraits of Grand Dukes of Lithuania, medals, archaeological artifacts. In September 1858, the museum was visited by Tsar Alexander II who even agreed to designate his heir presumptive Tsesarevich Nicholas Alexandrovich as guardian and benefactor of the museum and the Provisional Archaeological Commission. It was financed via admission charges, membership fees, and donations. Only in 1861, the government allotted an annual sum of 1,000 rubles to the museum. The museum also organized lectures and courses (246 in 1859 and 480 in 1862). In 1862, the museum organized a special exhibition of items from Egypt, China, Japan, mostly donated by officers of the Imperial Russian Navy. The exhibition was open for about a month (from 25 March to Easter Sunday).

=== 1865–1915: center of Russification ===
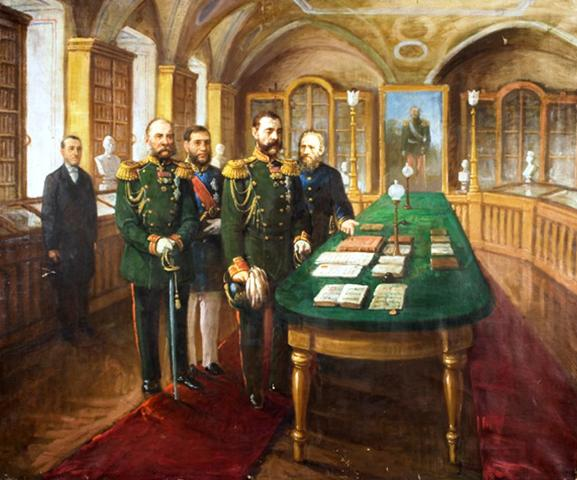
Tsar Alexander II visits Vilnius Public Library in 1867 (painting by Ivan Trutnev)

After the failed Uprising of 1863, the Tsarist regime enacted strict Russification policies. Already in November 1863, Governor General Mikhail Muravyov-Vilensky ordered a sculpture of King Władysław II Jagiełło and Jadwiga by sculptor Tomasz Oskar Sosnowski to be removed as it inspired Polish patriotism. In February 1865, Muravyov organized a commission to reorganize the museum which included general Arkady Dmitrievich Stolypin, Ivan Petrovich Kornilov, Mikhail Shakhovskoy-Glebov-Streshnev. The commission sought to discredit the museum and targeted sentimental items related to Polish and romantic nationalism, often ridiculing their dubious value and authenticity. For example, the commission frequently mentioned "moth eaten" cloak of poet Adam Mickiewicz and the binoculars that allegedly used by Tadeusz Kościuszko in the Battle of Maciejowice but were proven to be of a later technology. Many of museum holdings even remotely related to the former Polish–Lithuanian Commonwealth were taken to the Rumyantsev Museum in Moscow. For example, bust of Thomas Jefferson was removed fearing associations with Tadeusz Kościuszko or liberal democratic ideas. According to official protocols, the commission eliminated only 256 objects, but many more were moved to Moscow – estimated at 10,000 total items with perhaps as many as 6,029 numismatic items. Models of fortifications were removed to the Vilnius Military School. There were also reports of thefts and vandalism while the museum was closed. The thefts, particularly of numismatic items, continued. In 1902, the museum discovered long-term falsification of inventory books and more than 300 missing items.

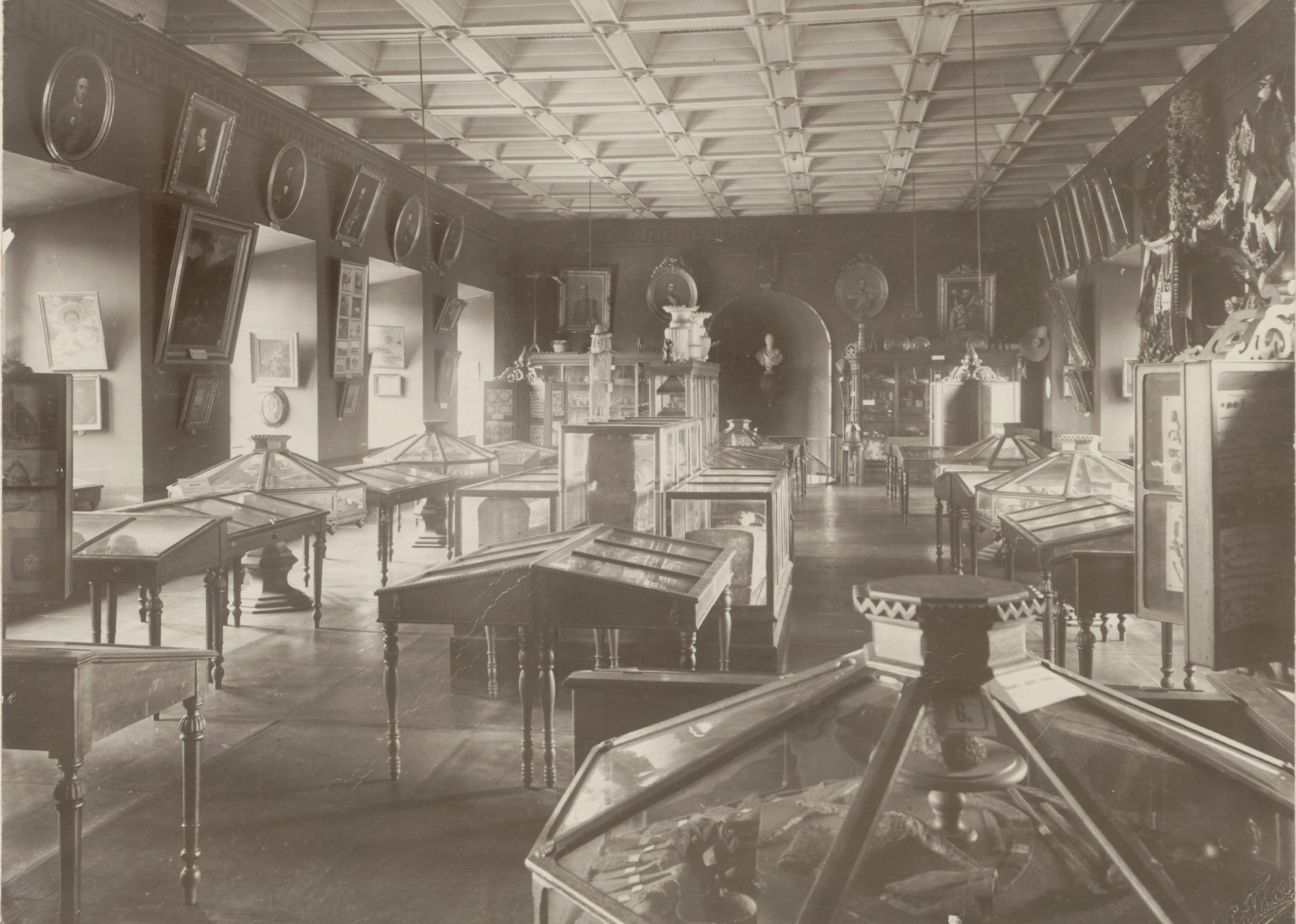
Main hall of the museum around 1904 with portraits of Russian Tsars on the far wall, portraits of Russian officials on the left, and Egyptian mummies at the center

The museum was nationalized and the Provisional Archaeological Commission was disbanded. Museum library was turned into the Vilnius Public Library and the museum was attached to it. The main hall (the present-day Hall of Pranciškus Smuglevičius) was given to the library while the museum moved to the third floor. The main hall was redecorated – painter Vasily Gryaznov replaced Neoclassicist murals of Smuglewicz's with Neo-Byzantine decor. Three ceiling paintings were removed and were lost; the Smuglewicz's interior was restored by Jerzy Hoppen in 1929. The library was officially opened on 24 May 1867 in a ceremony attended by Tsar Alexander II. The new museum served to support and promote the official Russification policies. It now included a number of Slavic items, for example portraits of Russian officials or items related to the Eastern Orthodox Church. The reorganized museum lost the support from local population; the museum continued to receive contributions but those were mostly coins or small items. The museum was visited mostly by schoolchildren and soldiers during mandatory trips. It was visited by 9,514 people in 1905 and by 12,180 people in 1907. Interest in collecting items related to Polish–Lithuanian history did not diminish; instead, it became a form of passive resistance and an expression national pride. Some institutions, such as Ossolineum in Lviv or Polish Museum in Rapperswil, were established outside of the Russian Empire. As these new cultural centers were far outside of Lithuania, it contributed to Vilnius losing its leading role in Polish–Lithuanian cultural life.

Overall, the new library and museum suffered chronic shortages of premises, qualified staff, and funding. The museum showed little interest in studying history or archaeology until archaeologist Fyodor Pokrovsky became museum director in 1884. He studied tumuli, published museum guide with some photographs in 1892, and helped organizing the 9th congress of the Moscow Archaeological Society in Vilnius in 1893. Due to his urging, the Imperial Russian Archaeological Society started sending coin hoards found in the Northwestern Krai to the museum (a total of 46 hoards were acquired during his tenure). After the Russian Revolution of 1905, Russification policies were relaxed and various societies were able to function openly. The Polish Society of Friends of Science and the Lithuanian Scientific Society were particularly interested in history. The museum published two catalogs of its holdings (natural science section in 1905 and history section in 1906) as well as nine volumes of reports on its activities in 1902–1914. In 1907–1908, it also attempted to retrieve the removed exhibits from Moscow. During World War I, many more items were transported to Russia and the museum ceased operations when the city was occupied by the Germans. In 1915, 36 bags and 23 boxes of materials were moved to the Rumyantsev Museum. The description of these items only briefly mentioned that it consisted of numismatic collection, fabrics, old crosses, weapons, manuscripts. Many other items were looted. In particular, lost items included bronze archaeological artifacts and silver coins.

== Archaeological and Archaeographic Commissions ==
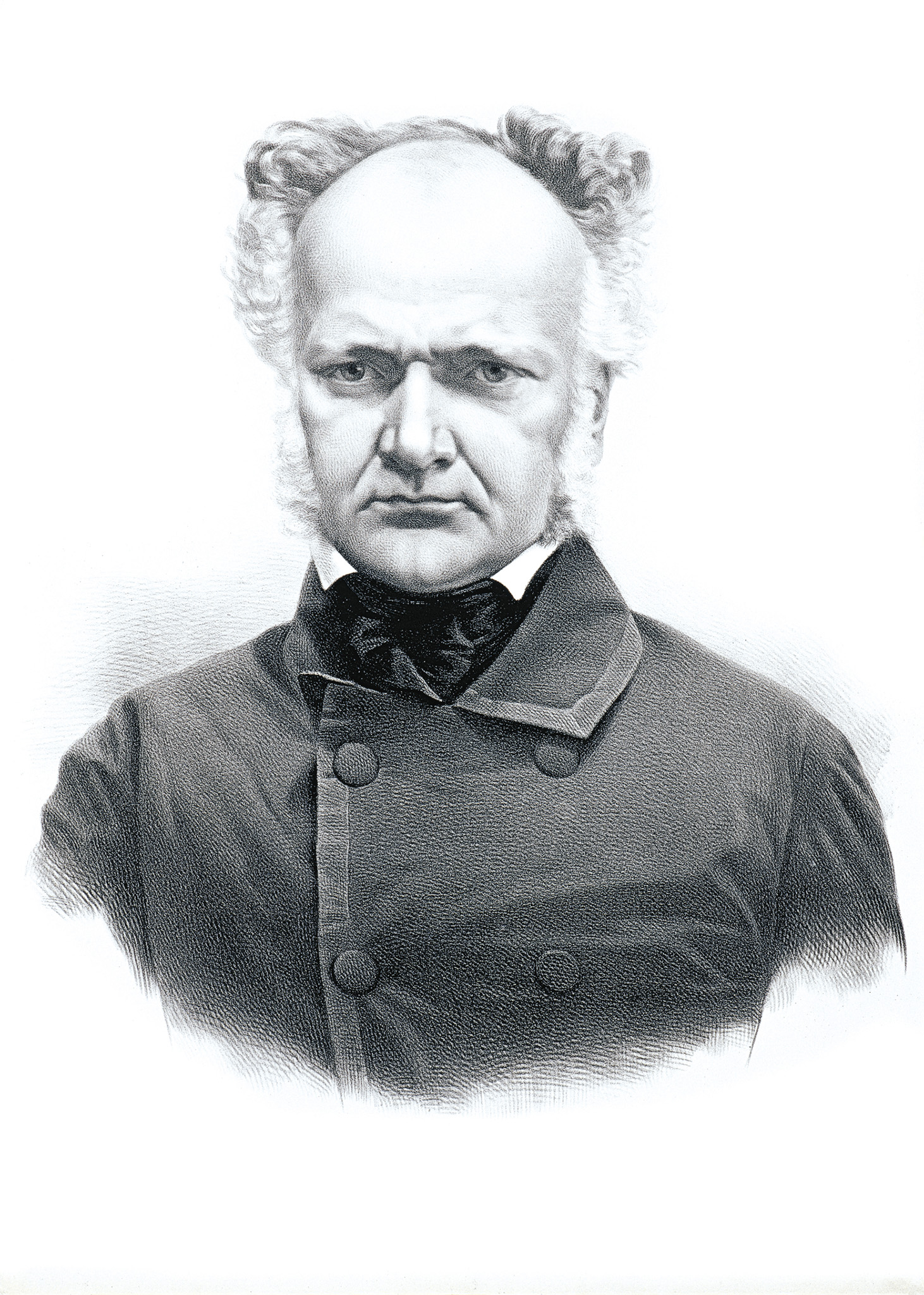
Eustachy Tyszkiewicz, founder of the museum and chairman of the Provisional Archaeological Commission

The Provisional Archaeological Commission, established at the same time as the museum, was in charge of the museum and its upkeep. It was initially established as a temporary or provisional group, but quickly became a well respected learned society and an integral part of the museum. It was chaired by Eustachy Tyszkiewicz; it formally reported to the Governor-General of Vilna who approved its staff, membership, and budget. The commission grew from 15 true members to 75 true members. Members were divided into four categories: true, fellow, supporting, and honorary members. In total, it had about 200 members, including historians Józef Ignacy Kraszewski, Władysław Syrokomla, Teodor Narbut, Adam Honory Kirkor, Adam Alfred Plater. Lithuanian members included Laurynas Ivinskis, Mikalojus Akelaitis, bishop Motiejus Valančius. Members wrote and presented papers on archaeology and history. The commission held monthly meetings and organized archaeological excavations, excursions across Lithuania, and publications. It published two volumes of Pamiętniki Komisji Archeologicznej Wileńskiej (Notes of the Vilnius Archaeological Commission) and a collection of royal act and privileges from 1387 to 1711 compiled by Ignacy Daniłowicz. More volumes were prepared and planned, but not published. The commission had ambitious goals of establishing a protocol for proper archaeological excavations, compiling a catalog of archaeological and architectural monuments in Lithuania, collecting information on famous people and old archives, libraries, collections. In 1858, the commission petitioned to be officially reorganized into a learned society that would have four sections (archaeology, archaeography, natural science, and statistics-economics), but the project was not approved.

After the Uprising of 1863, the commission was closed and replaced by the government-sponsored Vilnius Archaeographic Commission (copying the example of the Imperial Archaeographic Commission). It was chaired by Yakub Holovatsky in 1868–1888, Julian Krachkovsky in 1888–1902, and Flavian Dobryansky in 1902–1913. It was no longer in charge of the museum, which was subordinated to the Vilnius educational district. Instead, the commission focused on publishing historical material that would demonstrate that Lithuania was an ancient Russian and Eastern Orthodox land that needed to return to its roots (i.e. the official position to justify various Russification policies). The commission published 14 books and 39 volumes of Acts of the Vilna Archeographic Commission (Акты Виленской археографической комиссии), which published primary sources on the social and economic history. The documents included files from courts in Vilnius, Hrodna, Ukmergė, Upytė, Trakai, Minsk, Slonim (vols. 2–9, 22, 26, 32, 36), magistrates in Vilnius and Mogilev (vols. 10, 20, 39), Lithuanian Tribunal (vols. 11–13, 15), inventories of Lithuanian manors (vols. 25, 35, 38), documents on Lithuanian nobility (vol. 24), Lipka Tatars and Lithuanian Jews (vols. 28, 29, 31), Eastern Orthodox Church (vol. 33), Union of Brest (vol. 16), Russo-Polish War (1654–1667) and French invasion of Russia in 1812 (vols. 34, 37). Russian administration also established an archaeological commission, a local chapter of the Imperial Russian Geographical Society, but it was largely inactive.

== Vilnius Public Library ==
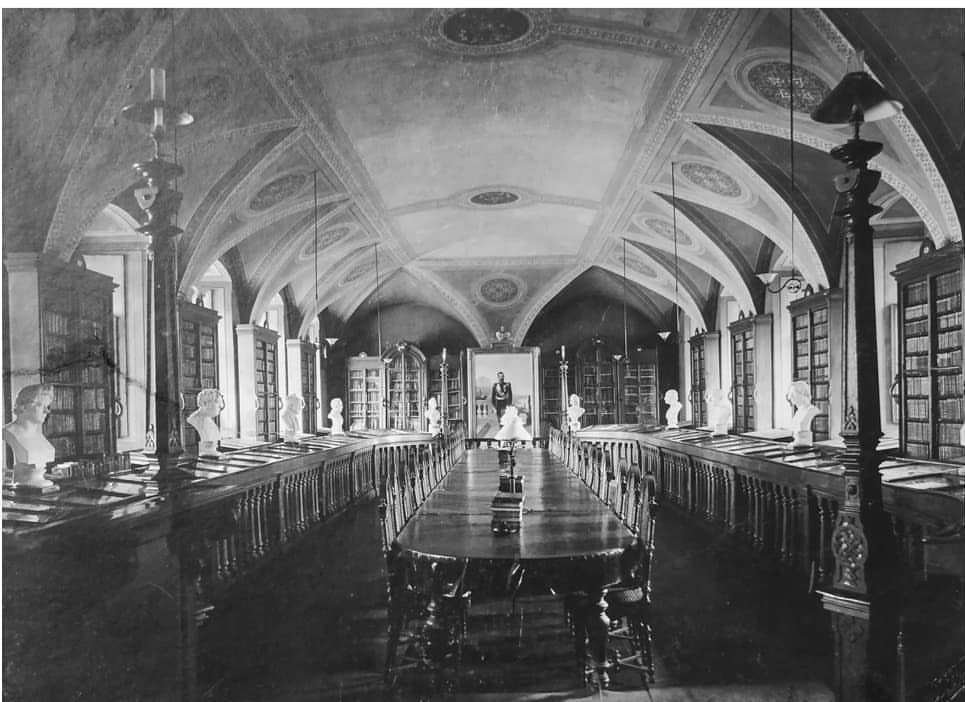
Main hall of Vilnius Public Library around 1904

Even though the Museum of Antiquities held a large number of books and manuscripts, it did not operate a library. The museum had a small reading cabinet from 1859 but the government refused to issue a permit for a full library. When the Museum of Antiquities was nationalized and reorganized, the government established Vilnius Public Library based on the book collections of the museum. This development lagged about 30 years behind the establishment of public libraries at other governorates of the Russian Empire. At the time, the plans were to transform Vilnius University Library into a public library, but the closure of Vilnius University put the plans on hold. The new public library was a typical government-run institution fully dependent on the Vilnius educational district and with a mission to become an outpost of Russian culture. Many of its employees were members of the Eastern Orthodox clergy. The Museum of Antiquities became a division of the new library. The shift from historical artifacts to published works was inline with government's Russification goals. The Lithuanian press was banned with hopes of replacing Polish language with Russian in public life. According to the official position, before the Union of Lublin of 1569, the Grand Duchy of Lithuania was a Russian state with books and decrees in the Ruthenian language and needed to be returned to its roots.

The library held some rare publications and publications, such as a 1476 book on Thomas Aquinas, prayer books handwritten on parchments, first edition of the Statute of Lithuania, original acts of Kings Alexander Jagiellon, Sigismund I the Old, and others, the entire archive of the Sapieha family from Dziarečyn. In 1904, the library started receiving the mandatory library copy of books and periodicals published in Vilnius, Kaunas, Grodno, Minsk, and Mogilev Governorates. It also started publishing annual reports (in 1902–1910 and 1914) and calendars in Russian (from 1904). The library held 283,669 volumes (115,533 in Russian and 168,166 in other languages) in 1913 and about 310,000 volumes in 1915. That made it the fourth largest library in the Russian Empire. In total, in 1867–1910, the library was visited by 348,731 readers (298,444 men and 50,287 women) who borrowed 465,012 publications (438,343 in Russian and 26,669 in other languages).

The library ceased operations during World War I when Vilnius was occupied by the Germans in summer 1915. Many of the books and manuscripts were transported to Russia or looted. In December 1918, the closed library was handed to Lithuanians by the German authorities. The short-lived Lithuanian SSR appointed Eduards Volters as the library's director. The reopened library functioned for about a month before it was closed by the occupying Polish forces. Sometimes this short-lived library is cited as the genesis of the Martynas Mažvydas National Library of Lithuania. It reopened in August 1919 as the library of the reestablished Vilnius University.

== Collections ==
=== Local history ===
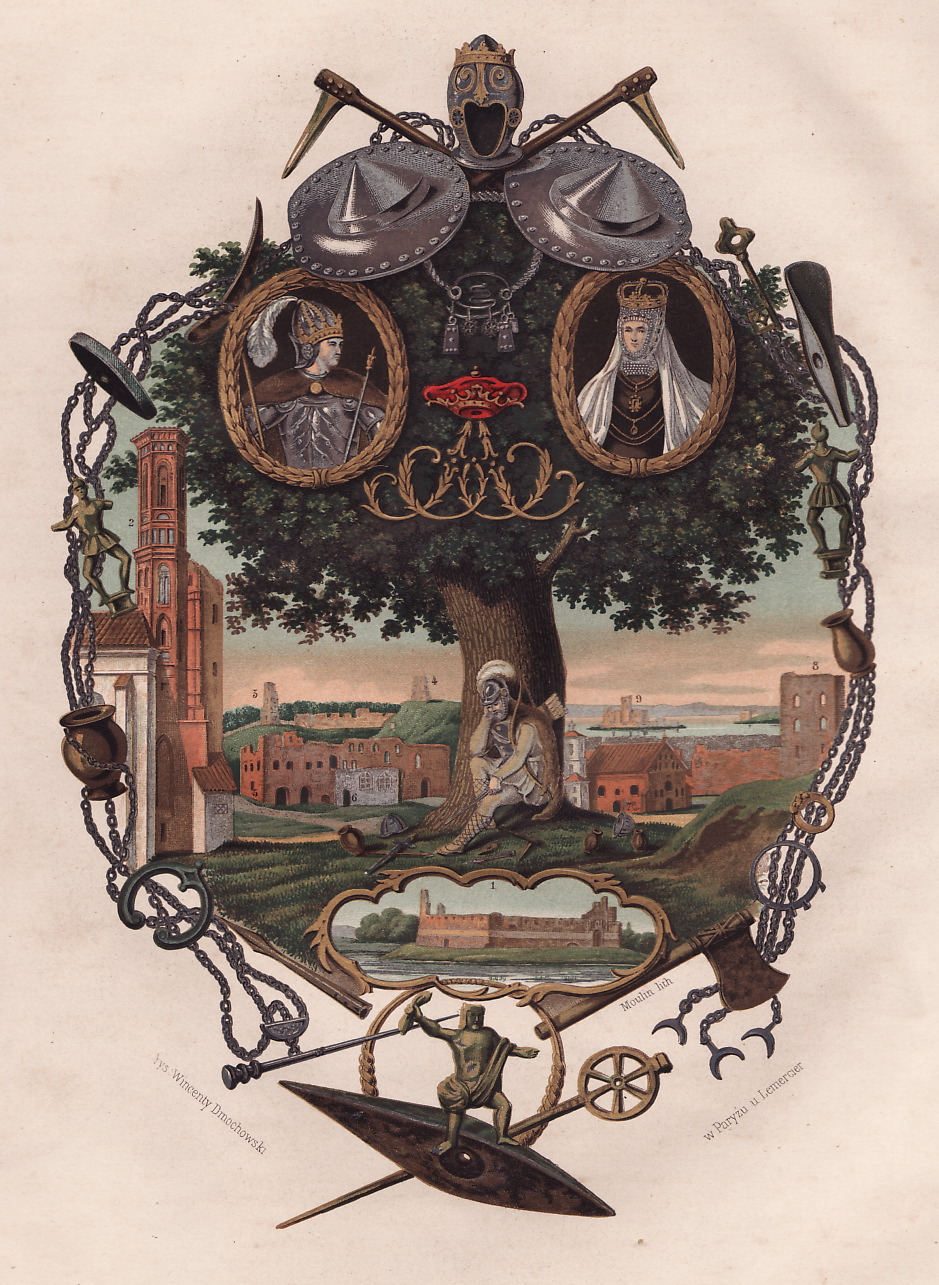
Illustration by Wincenty Dmochowski that reflected romantic nationalism: portraits of Grand Duke Vytautas and Queen Barbara Radziwiłł above the ruins of medieval castles and surrounded by archaeological finds, including the supposed figurine of Perkūnas

The basis of the initial collection was about 6,000 items gifted by Eustachy Tyszkiewicz – more than half of the items were books, while other items were coins, medals, portraits, engravings, historical artifacts. The museum collected items and archives from the various closed Catholic monasteries (including about 7,000 monastery books) and churches as well as the former Vilnius University. Among its history exhibits, the museum had weapons, armor, uniforms, flags of nobles and soldiers from the former Grand Duchy of Lithuania, privileges of the Grand Dukes of Lithuania, archaeological artifacts, and mythological objects. The museum had about 50 portrait of Lithuanian Grand Dukes and about 60 portraits of prominent Lithuanian nobles, among them Jan Karol Chodkiewicz, Piotr Skarga, Szymon Marcin Kossakowski, Adam Mickiewicz.

The museum grew primarily from donations of local nobles, including members of the Kossakowski, Ogiński, Radziwiłł, Sapieha families. Thus the collection reflected interests and moods of Lithuanian nobility. In private correspondence, museum founders often referred to the museum as the Lithuanian Museum reflecting its patriotic character. The collection included a number of items related to the Kościuszko Uprising in 1794, French invasion of Russia in 1812, faculty members of the closed Vilnius University. Some of the items were of little historical value and of dubious authenticity, but served romantic nationalism. For example, cap that Julian Ursyn Niemcewicz wore on the day of his execution, lock of hair of Napoleon, grass from the grave of poet Franciszek Karpiński, a piece of bed drapes from the deathbed of Władysław IV Vasa. In a catalog of 1858, the first listed item was a bronze figure of Perkūnas, the Lithuanian god of thunder, found in Kernavė but it was revealed to be a piece of a 13th-century candelabra from Hildesheim in Germany. Other figurines of supposedly Lithuanian gods included sculptures of the god of war Kovas, the goddess of wisdom Praurimė, the goddess of love Milda, the household spirit žaltys, priestess vaidilutė.

Almost all items related to Polish–Lithuanian history were removed during the reorganization in 1865, while other collections (such as weapons or items from Ancient Egypt) were left mostly intact. Many of the removed Polish–Lithuanian items were replaced by items related to the Russian Empire and the Eastern Orthodox Church. For example, items in the Chancery Slavonic language to showcase Russian roots that Lithuanians should return to (an official position to justify Russification), a gallery of portraits of Russian officials and Orthodox metropolitans, silver hammer and shovel that Tsar Alexander II used to ceremoniously open the construction of the Paneriai railway tunnel in 1858. Paintings of episodes from the history of Lithuania were replaced by paintings of landscapes. Even according to the draft museum statute, newly acquired items of Polish or Catholic character were to be exchanged with other Russian museums for "more relevant" items. The Russification efforts relaxed somewhat after 1904–1905. For example, exhibits related to Governor General Mikhail Muravyov-Vilensky were removed to a separate museum located in the present-day Presidential Palace.

=== Numismatics and ethnography ===
The 1898 catalogue supplement described 38 coin hoards containing 9,061 coins.

The numismatics collection grew based on various donations from nobles (for example, 48 Tatar coins of the Golden Horde found in the Kazan Governorate) but mainly from acquisition of local coin hoards. Between 1855 and 1865, the Museum of Antiquities acquired 22 coin hoards. In 1865, the vast majority of numismatic items, including all the hoards except for the six silver bars of Lithuanian long currency found in Veliuona, were taken to Moscow. Between 1865 and 1915, the museum acquired 56 coin hoards. Some of the coins were removed to Saint Petersburg in 1885 and to Moscow in 1915. Today, the National Museum of Lithuania only one hoard from the collections of the Museum of Antiquities. The hoards ranged from the Roman currency and Arabic dirhams to coins of the early 19th century. The largest hoards in terms of number of coins included 1,345 Prussian and Polish coins from the 16–17th centuries (acquired in 1863), 2,630 various 17th-century coins from the Holy Roman Empire, Netherlands, etc. (found in Vilnius, acquired in 1866), 1,599 silver Russian coins from the 16–17th centuries (found in Vilnius, acquired in 1890), two hoards of 1,261 and 1,370 mostly 17th-century schillings from Riga (acquired in 1892 and 1897).

The museum collected various historical, archaeological, ethnographic items related to other nations. In 1863, the ethnographic collection included about 406 objects from China, Japan, Egypt and Siberia. There were also a few items from the Turks, Bulgarians, Hutsuls, Eskimos, Bashkirs, Buryats. Notably, the museum did not collect samples of local Lithuanian, Polish, or Russian folk art. Often, these were curiosities and souvenirs of dubious authenticity from foreign travels by local nobles. Many of the items from China and Japan were collected during a trip around the world on Russian frigate Askold. Other exotic items included ashes from Pompeii, golden Greek diadem found in Nikopol, rock crystal candelabra that belonged to the Archbishops of Paris, hand fan gifted by the Emperor of Japan, aboriginal spear gifted by the viceroy of Ceylon. The museum had a small selection of items from Ancient Egypt the basis for which was 222 items donated by Michał Tyszkiewicz in 1862. The collection included five mummies – 21st Dynasty mummy donated by Aleksander Branicki in 1861, two fake child mummies donated by Michał Tyszkiewicz in 1862, and two mummies with sarcophagus donated by Chlodwig, Prince of Hohenlohe-Schillingsfürst, in 1898. After the nationalization in 1865, the museum displayed these foreign items rather prominently (e.g. Egyptian mummies were at the center of the main hall), but received essentially no new donations with notable exceptions of the two mummies in 1898 and 180 photographs of Southern Europe and Asia that documented the itinerary of the Eastern journey of Nicholas II.

=== Natural history ===
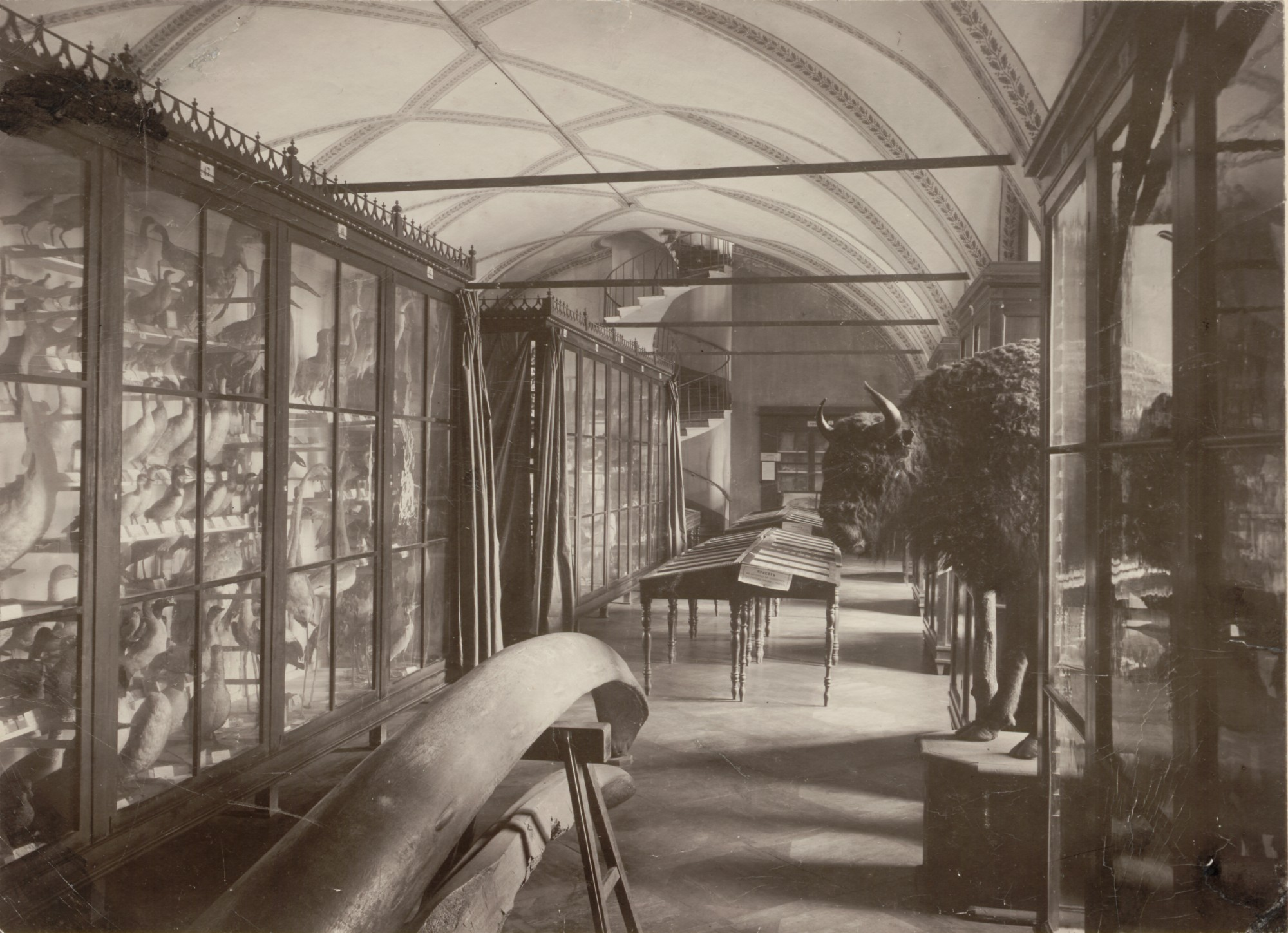
Zoological exhibit around 1904 with taxidermy of European bison on the right

In 1827, Vilnius University had about 20,800 samples of minerals with additional 14,000 duplicate samples used by gymnasiums. When the university and its successor Academy of Medicine–Surgery were closed, a large portion of the collection was moved to the Saint Vladimir Royal University of Kiev, Richelieu Lyceum, and other schools. However, about 10,000 remained in Vilnius and were transferred to the Museum of Antiquities in 1857. Samples included gemstones (pyrope, beryl, geodes, chalcedony, hematite, hydrophane opal), silicates (clay, mica, asbestos, basalt, lava from Vesuvius), coal, anthracite, graphite, amber, metals (gold, pyrite, malachite, magnetite, hematite from Elba gifted by Adam Jerzy Czartoryski, limonite, galena, cassiterite, stibnite), sedimentary and volcanic rocks. The museum had three pairs of gloves made of asbestos and cotton, gifted by Michał Kleofas Ogiński. A catalog from 1905 presented 1,636 minerals and 72 fossils, among them the main fragment of the Zabrodje meteorite.

An inventory from 1832 registered about 20,000 zoological items at Vilnius University, including bones of a mammoth (79 bones and 40 teeth), items collected by Georg Forster during the second voyage of James Cook, jaw bone of bowhead whale likely from a collection of Krzysztof Radziwiłł, and three European bisons from the Białowieża Forest. In 1839, the collection included 25,331 specimen, of which 17,760 were insects (including 8,889 exotic butterflies purchased by Ludwig Heinrich Bojanus) and 840 were birds. After the university was closed, a large part of the collection was moved to the university in Kiev and other schools. Remnants of the collection were inherited by the Museum of Antiquities. It was enlarged by an ornithological collection of Konstanty Tyzenhauz (1,093 birds, 563 eggs) as well as donation of mollusc shells for the Lake Baikal in 1858 and 1,324 seashells in 1860–1861. The collection numbered 16,294 items in 1855. After the museum was nationalized in 1865, some items were moved to other institutions and the remainder received less attention and some items were lost (for example, wet specimens got frozen). In 1906, the collection numbered 2,319 items (not counting insects).

=== Fate of exhibits ===
Museum Holdings in 1865
Category	Items	Category	Items
Archaeology	3,818	Art	3,948
Numismatics	8,110	Books	19,700
Sigillography	487	Manuscripts	2,638
Ethnography	408	Natural history	27,794
Other	300		
Total	67,203		

A large part of the museums holdings was taken to the Rumyantsev Museum in Moscow in 1865 and 1915. From there, the some items were moved to the Pushkin Museum and the State Historical Museum. Remaining items in Vilnius were used by various museums. In 1919, Jonas Basanavičius, Paulius Galaunė, and others tried to establish a History–Ethnography Museum in the former Basilian church and monastery of the Holy Trinity. The plan failed after the city was captured by Poland in 1920 and the items were moved back to the reestablished Vilnius University (now known as the Stefan Batory University). In 1940, all of museum holdings were transferred to the Lithuanian Academy of Sciences. After World War II, the History and Ethnography Museum was established in 1952. After the reestablishment of independence in 1990, the museum was reorganized into the National Museum of Lithuania.

It is estimated that the National Museum of Lithuania inherited only about 1,000 items from the Museum of Antiquities. However, a number of the exhibits of the former museum are preserved at various other Lithuanian institutions. For example, at least fourteen portraits from the museum are currently held by the Lithuanian Art Museum, including Tsar Nicholas I (an anonymous copy after Franz Krüger), Mikhail Muravyov-Vilensky by Nikolai Tikhobrazov, Dmitry Bludov by Ivan Trutnev, Pompey Batiushkov by Nikolay Koshelev, two portraits of Metropolitan Yosyf Semashko, before and after his conversion from the Ruthenian Uniate Church to Eastern Orthodoxy, attributed to Konstantin Makovsky. Geology Museum of Vilnius University inherited a number of minerals and fossils, while Zoological Museum of Vilnius University inherited some of the zoological specimens.

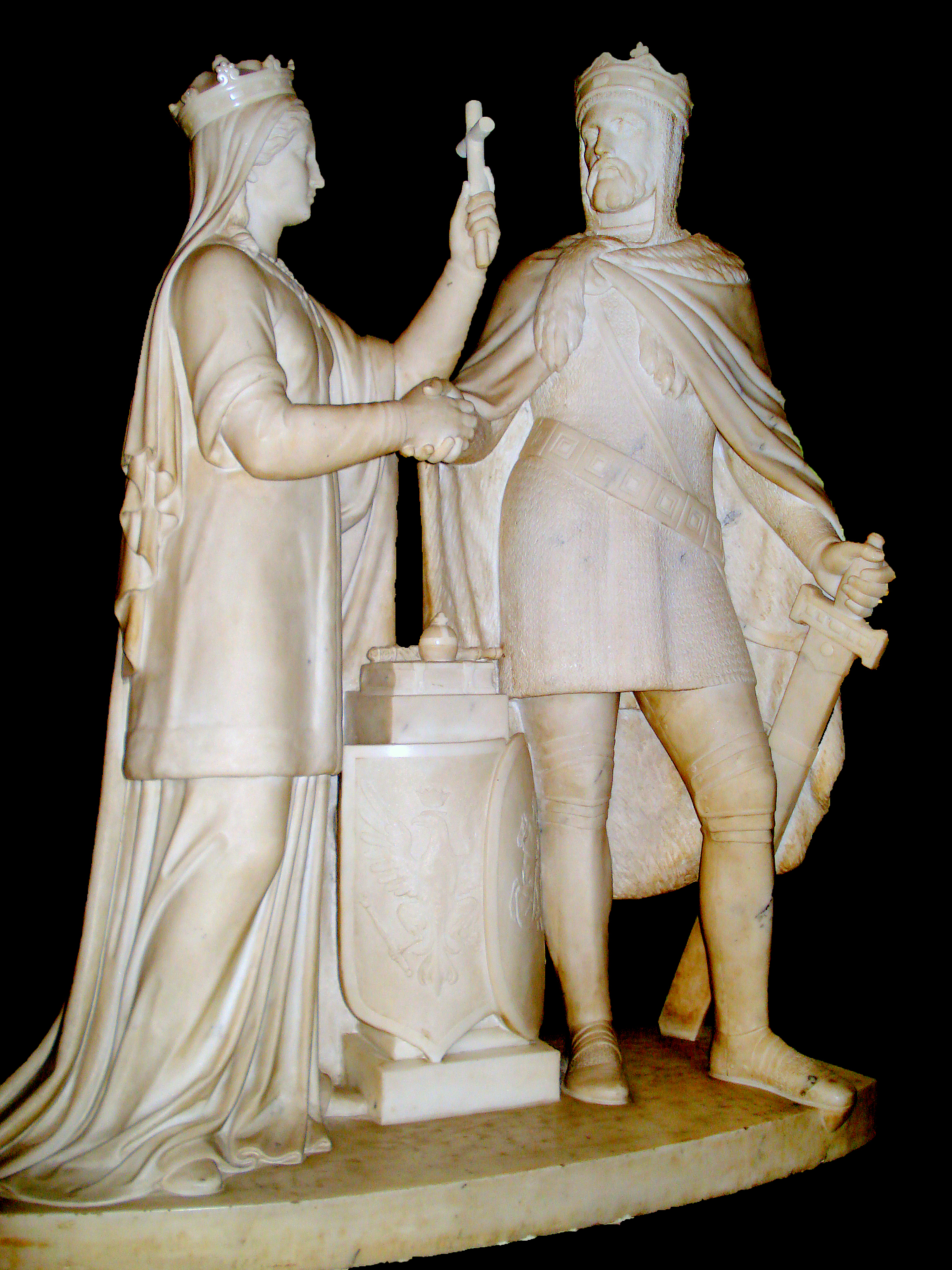
Sculpture of King Władysław II Jagiełło and Jadwiga removed in 1863 and returned to Vilnius in 1931

Already in 1918, activists, including Jonas Basanavičius and the short-lived People's Commissar of Internal Affairs of the Lithuanian SSR, started working on recovering the removed exhibits from Russia. The Soviet–Lithuanian Peace Treaty of 1920 and the Peace of Riga of 1921 stipulated that Russia would return cultural and historical valuables to Lithuania and Poland, respectively. There were numerous negotiations, but the valuables (including Lithuanian Metrica) were not returned – both Poland and Lithuania sought the same valuables as they both claimed Vilnius Region and its heritage while Russia had no desire or incentive to return the items. During the interwar, Lithuania managed to recover some archives, but only one item from the former collections of the Museum of Antiquities was returned – the sculpture of King Władysław II Jagiełło and Jadwiga. In 1928, it was transferred to Warsaw and then in 1931 to Vilnius.

When Lithuanian SSR became part of the Soviet Union, Lithuanian museologists had a little more luck obtaining the items from Russia. In 1956–1968, the History and Ethnography Museum managed to obtain 285 items from Russian museums: 124 items (32 portraits, 68 weapons, 4 goblets, 13 textile items, 6 kontusz sashes, and flag of Trakai Voivodeship) from the State Historical Museum in 1956, 158 graphic works from the Pushkin Museum in 1966, and 3 items from the State Historical Museum in 1968. In 1986, Lithuanian professors from Vilnius University attempted to obtain about 1,000 samples of minerals from Odessa University (some of these still bore labels identifying that they came from Vilnius) but received only about 70 low-value items. The issue of recovering cultural valuables was revisited after Lithuania declared independence in 1990. Already in 1990, the National Museum of Lithuania declared that it sought to recover 6,636 numismatic items, 253 portraits, 512 graphic works, 400 ethnographic items, 142 seals as well as weapons and other objects. However, identifying specific objects proved to be very difficult (inventories of the Museum of Antiquities are often imprecise, laconic, or incomplete; Russian museums have often not preserved the provenance of their items; there is lack of interest and funding from the Lithuanian side) and no objects have been returned to Lithuania since 1990.
