= Tikhobrazov =

Tikhobrazov (Russian: Тихобразов; feminine Tikhobrazova) is a surname of Russian origin. Notable people with the surname include:

- Nicolas Tikhobrazoff (1946–2022), French painter and radio host
- Nikolai Tikhobrazov (1818–1874), Russian painter
