= Eustachy Tyszkiewicz =

Polish noble, archaeologist and historian

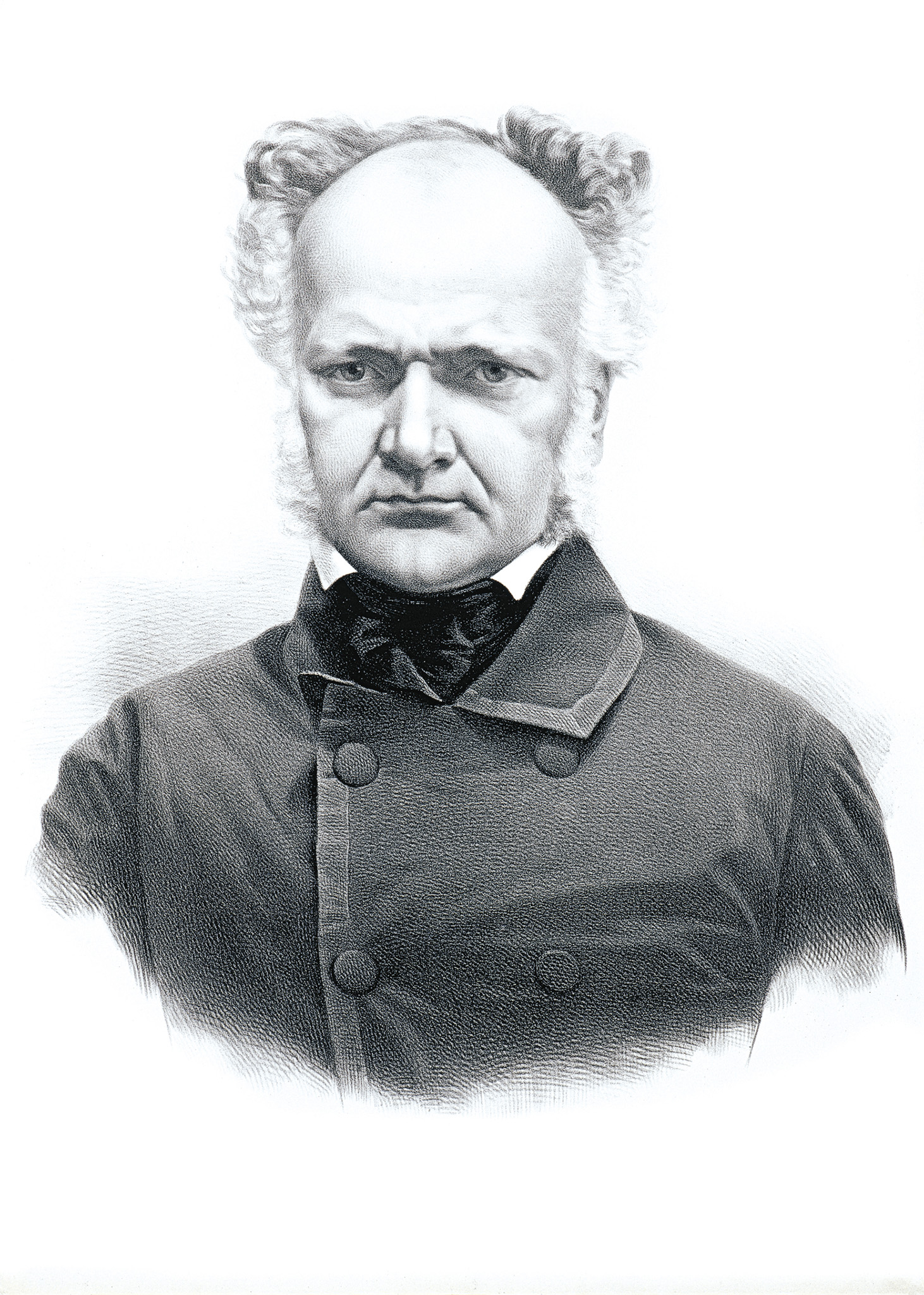
- Count Eustachy Tyszkiewicz
- Born: 18 April 1814; Lahoysk, Minsk Governorate, Russian Empire
- Died: 27 August 1873 (aged 59); Vilnius, Vilna Governorate, Russian Empire
- Resting place: Rasos cemetery
- Known for: Founder of the Museum of Antiquities in Vilnius
- Awards: Order of Saint Stanislaus (2nd class); Order of Saint Anna (2nd class)
- Scientific career
- Fields: Archaeology, history, museums
- Workplaces: Russian government service

Count Eustachy Tyszkiewicz, Leliwa coat of arms, (18 April 1814 – 27 August 1873) was a Polish–Lithuanian noble from the Tyszkiewicz family. He was an archaeologist and historian of the former Grand Duchy of Lithuania and White Ruthenia, then part of the Russian Empire. He is considered the first archaeologist to have undertaken a systematic study of historical sites in Belarus and Lithuania, and was highly influential on succeeding generations of archaeologists. In 1855 he founded the Museum of Antiquities in Vilnius, which is regarded as the predecessor institution of the National Museum of Lithuania. He donated his personal collection of archaeological and historical artifacts to start the museum. He was a younger brother of historian Konstanty Tyszkiewicz.

== Biography ==
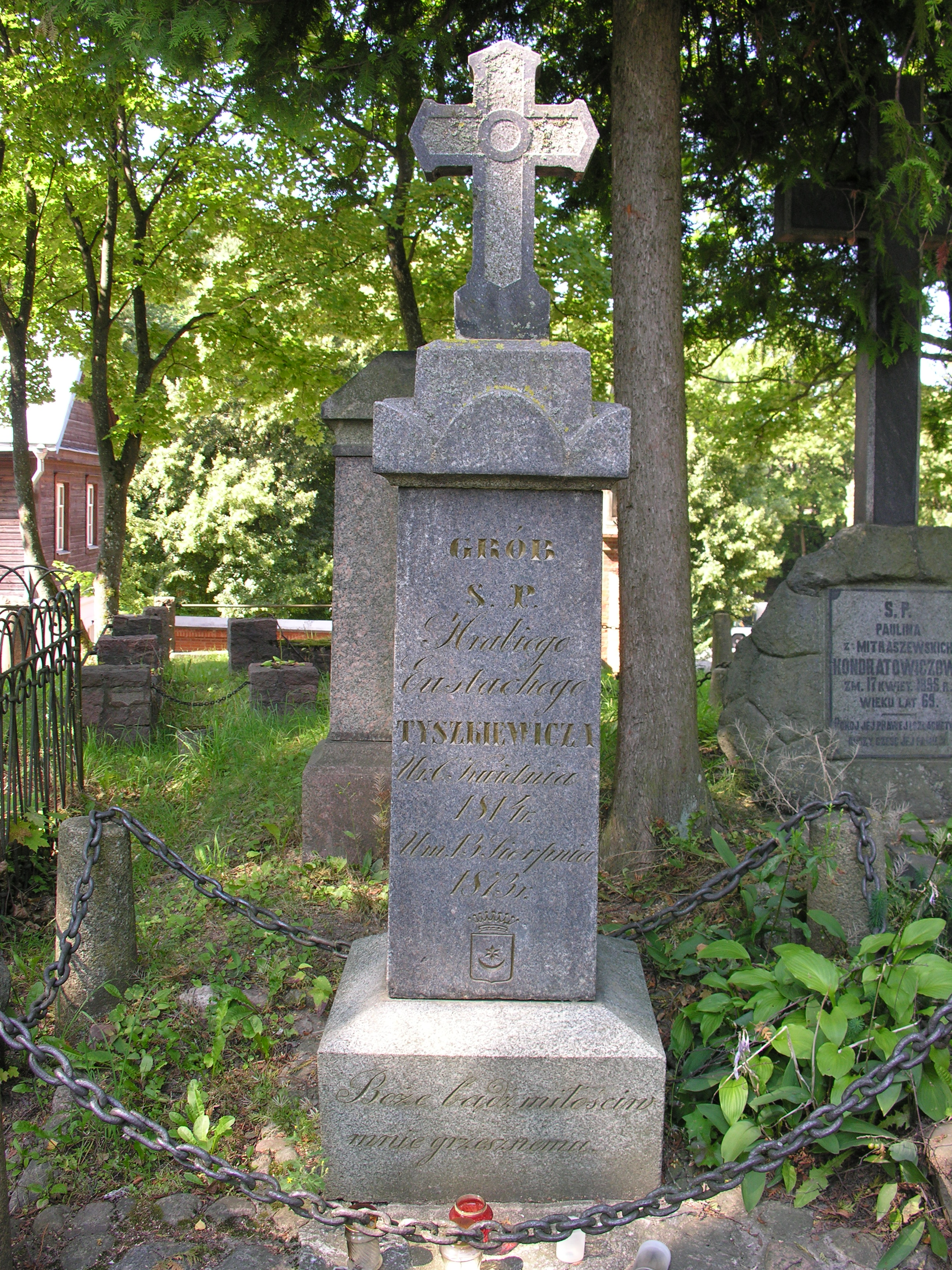
Tyszkiewicz's tomb in the Rasos cemetery

According to his memoirs, Tyszkiewicz was born in Minsk, not in Lahoysk, as researchers believe. Tyszkiewicz was the younger son of Pius Tyszkiewicz and his wife, Augusta, née Broel-Plater. He spent his childhood on the family estate in Lahoysk. He began his secondary schooling at the Vilnius Gymnasium, but due to poor health he transferred to Minsk. Two years after graduation, he began his career in government service in 1833 in the Chapter of Imperial Orders of Knighthood. At the same time, (1833–34) he began collecting archival material on the literature and history of the Commonwealth of Poland-Lithuania from sources in Moscow and Saint Petersburg. He then held a series of government posts in various locations: at the office of the Vilna Governorate-General (1835–1838), the Kraków Governorate (1838–1840), and Little-Russian Governorate-General (1840). He became a school inspector of the Barysaw District and marshal of nobility (1842–1848), then governor of the Minsk Male Gymnasium (1848–1854). In 1853 he was appointed overseer of the Vilnius psychiatric hospital. He held the roles of collegiate assessor and kammerjunker.

In May 1855, Tsar Alexander II of Russia approved the creation by Tyszkiewicz of the Vilnius Archaeological Commission and of the Museum of Antiquities. The initial museum collection consisted of about 6,000 items gifted by Tyszkiewicz from his personal collection – more than half of the items were books, while other items were coins, medals, portraits, engravings and historical artefacts. Tyszkiewicz chaired the commission and curated the museum until it was nationalised and reorganised after the failed Polish Uprising of 1863. After losing his life's work, he retired to Astravas Manor near Biržai, which belonged to his relative, Michał Tyszkiewicz. There he studied local history, organised the manor's library and the archives of the Radziwiłł family, wrote historical treatises and gathered primary sources for publication. In 1871 he returned to Vilnius, where he died in 1874 and was buried in the Rasos cemetery.

== Archaeological work and Antiquities Museum ==
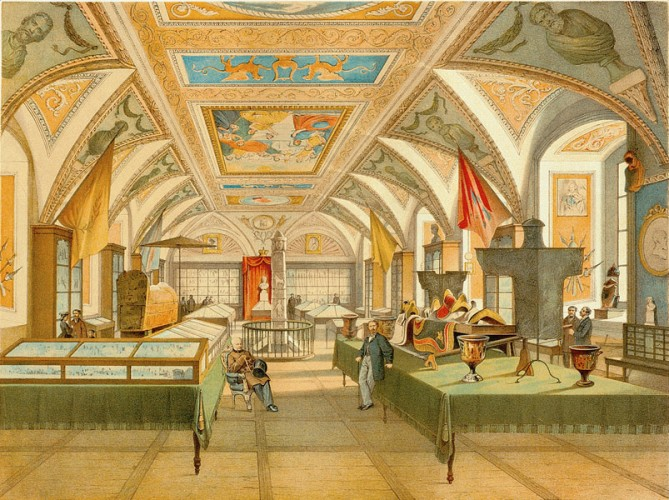
Tyszkiewicz sits on the left of the main hall of the Museum of Antiquities

He was noted as the first archaeologist with an academic and systematic approach to the study of Belarus and Lithuania, and had a great influence on succeeding generations of archaeologists. In 1855, on the basis of his personal collection of archaeological and historical artifacts, he founded the Museum of Antiquities in Vilnius, which is considered to be the predecessor of the National Museum of Lithuania.

Tyszkiewicz is considered the "father of archaeology" in the former Grand Duchy of Lithuania. From 1837 he carried out excavations in the Trakai Peninsula Castle and focused on tumuli. He excavated about fifty tumuli near Kernavė, Halshany, Barysaw, Kreva, Lida and Lahoysk. He took a systematic approach to artifacts and categorized them according to the three-age system, Stone, Bronze, and Iron Ages. He published his first studies in several Polish journals 1837–1841 and a separate monograph in Polish, the first devoted to archaeology in Lithuania, in 1842. It described the remains of medieval castles, hill forts, tumuli, bronze and iron artifacts, etc. The publication was well received and became a textbook of archaeology for others. It was translated into Russian in 1843 and German 1846. Based on the archaeological findings, he studied the Krivichs, a Slavic tribe, their territory and trade. He systematically analyzed similarities and differences of the tumuli of different regions and tribes. In 1872, he published his third significant work on archaeology where he outlined the developments in the field of archaeology over the previous decades.

Tyszkiewicz started making plans for a learned society, in the vacuum created by the closure of Vilnius University in 1832, after moving to Vilnius in 1835. At the suggestion of Theodor Narbut, he also started thinking about a history museum. In 1843, he toured Scandinavian countries, establishing contacts with various historical societies and gathering ideas for the future museum. He purchased a house in Antakalnis and opened a cabinet of antiquities for the public in 1847. He petitioned the Tsarist administration for permission to open a public museum twice, in 1848 and 1851, but the Museum of Antiquities was approved only in 1855. The Vilnius Archaeological Commission, which Tyszkiewicz chaired, acted as a de facto learned society. The museum was popular and its collections grew tenfold from 6,000 items donated by Tyszkiewicz to more than 67,000 items in 1865. After the failed Uprising of 1863, the Tsarist authorities instituted a number of strict Russification policies and nationalized the museum. Many valuable items, particularly those related to the former Polish–Lithuanian Commonwealth, were removed to the Rumyantsev Museum in Moscow. Tyszkiewicz formally oversaw the transformation of the museum into a department of the Vilnius Public Library and officially resigned from the museum in September 1867.

== Memberships and distinctions ==
He was a member of the St. Petersburg Academy of Sciences, Imperial Russian Archaeological Society, Royal Society of Northern Antiquities in Copenhagen, Royal Swedish Academy of Letters, History and Antiquities in Stockholm, and Royal Archaeological Institute in London.

He received several awards for his service, including:

- the Order of Saint Stanislaus (2nd class) in 1856 and
- the Order of Saint Anna (2nd class) in 1860.

== Selected works ==
Tyszkiewicz published several works, including:

- On archaeology:
  - A Look at Sources of Local Archaeology (Rzut oka na źródła archeologii krajowej, 1842)
  - Archaeological research into remnants of arts and crafts in ancient Lithuania and Lithuanian Rus (Badania archeologiczne nad zabytkami przedmiotów sztuk i rzemiosł w dawnej Litwie i Rusi Litewskiej, 1850)
  - Archaeology in Lithuania (Archeologja na Litwie, 1872)
- On ethnography:
  - Two-volumes of travel writing, Letters about Sweden (Listy o Szwecji, 1846)
  - Scenes of domesticity in Lithuania (Obrazy domowego pożycia na Litwie, 1865)
- On local history:
  - A Description of Barysaw Powiat (Opisanie powiatu borysowskiego..., 1847)
  - Biržai: An aperçu of the history of the city, its castle, and majorat (Birże: rzut oka na przeszlośc miasta, zamku i ordynacii, 1869)
  - Sources for the history of Courland and Semigallia (Źródła do dziejów Kurlandii i Semigalii..., 1870)

== Bibliography ==
- Maria Blombergowa, (1980). "Polscy członkowie Cesarskiego Moskiewskiego Towarzystwa Archeologicznego (1864-1914)" in: Kwartalnik Historii Nauki i Techniki, 25/3. p. 547. [in Polish] (article about Polish members of the Imperial Moscow Society of Archaeology (1864-1914))
- Outline of Broel-Plater family history on the "de Plater" site
- Genealogy of Eustachy Tyszkiewicz on the Maria Minakowska Sejm Wielki descendants site (in Polish)
