= Zabrodje meteorite =

Meteorite found in Belarus

Zabrodje
- Type: Chondrite
- Class: Ordinary chondrite
- Group: L chondrite
- Subgroup: L6
- Country: Belarus
- Region: Minsk Region
- Coordinates: 53°41′N 26°35′E
- Observed fall: Yes
- Fall date: 22 September 1893
- TKW: 3,643 grams (128.5 oz)
- Alternative names: Zabrodzie, Vilna

Zabrodje is an ordinary chondrite that fell through a roof of a house in the village of Zabroddzie, Stowbtsy District (then part of the Russian Empire, now Belarus) approximately two hours before dawn on 22 September 1893.

Only one fragment was recovered. Initial studies of the meteorite were conducted by professor Romul Prendel of the Odessa University. He took 488 grams (17.2 oz) for analysis; after his studies he deposited the remaining 300 grams (11 oz) at the Odessa University. The main mass of 3,155 grams (111.3 oz) ended up at the Museum of Antiquities in Vilnius.

The main mass of 2.6 kilograms (5.7 lb) is held at the Museum of Geology of Vilnius University. Other fragments are held: 300 grams (11 oz) at the Odessa University, 81 grams (2.9 oz) at the Russian Academy of Sciences, 30.7 grams (1.08 oz) at the Geological Survey of Canada, 5 grams (0.18 oz) at the Natural History Museum in Vienna, 4 grams (0.14 oz) at the National Museum of Natural History in Paris, Field Museum of Natural History in Chicago, and Natural History Museum in Berlin, 3 grams (0.11 oz) at the Natural History Museum in London, and others.
