= National Museum of Lithuania =

Museum in Vilnius, Lithuania

Coordinates: 54°41′14″N 25°17′21″E

- Lietuvos nacionalinis muziejus
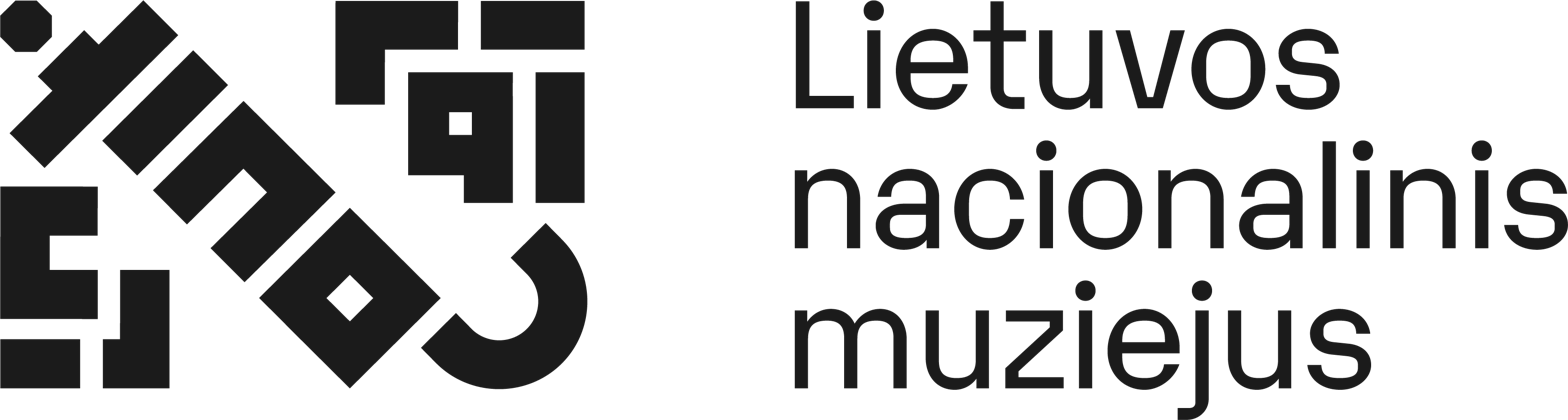

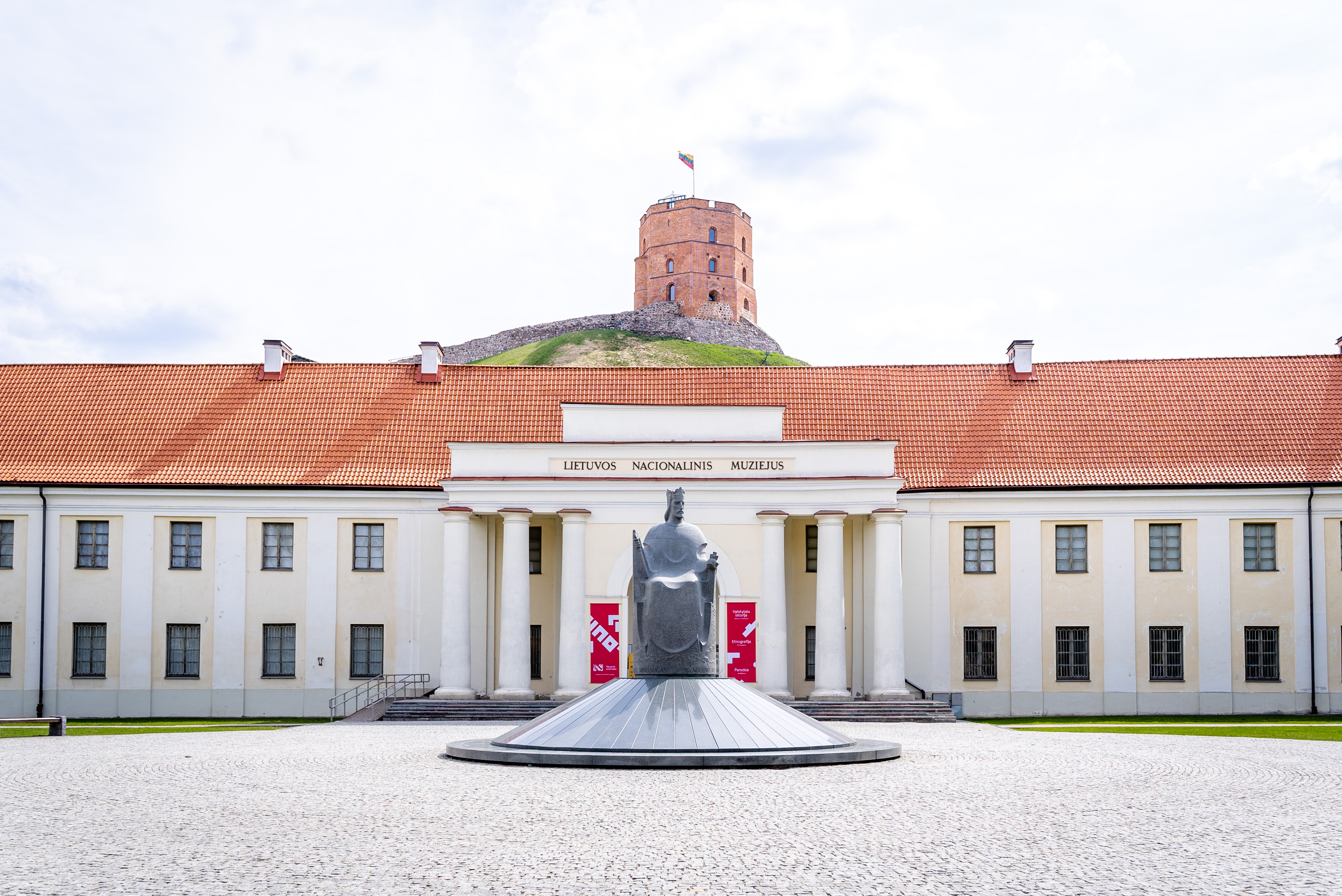
- The National Museum building, also known as "The New Arsenal" with the statute of King Mindaugas, in Vilnius, Lithuania
- Established: 1952
- Location: Arsenalo g. 1; 01143 Vilnius, Lithuania
- Director: Dr. Rūta Kačkutė
- Employees: 282 (as of August, 2024)
- Website: lnm.lt

The National Museum of Lithuania (Lithuanian: Lietuvos nacionalinis muziejus), established in 1952, is a state-sponsored historical museum that encompasses several significant structures and a wide collection of written materials and artifacts. It also organizes archeological digs in Lithuania.

== History ==
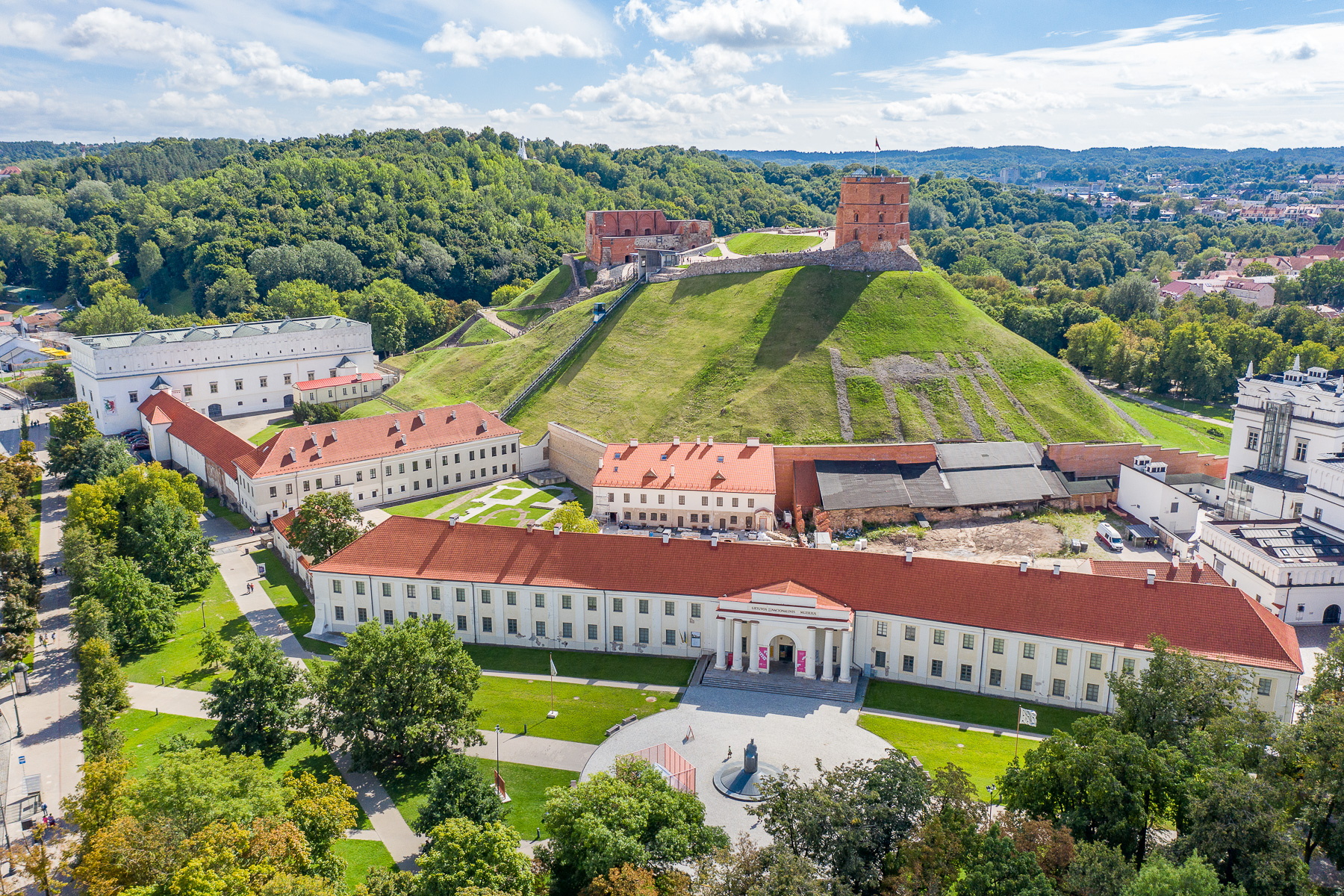
The New Arsenal (centre) in Vilnius Castle Complex

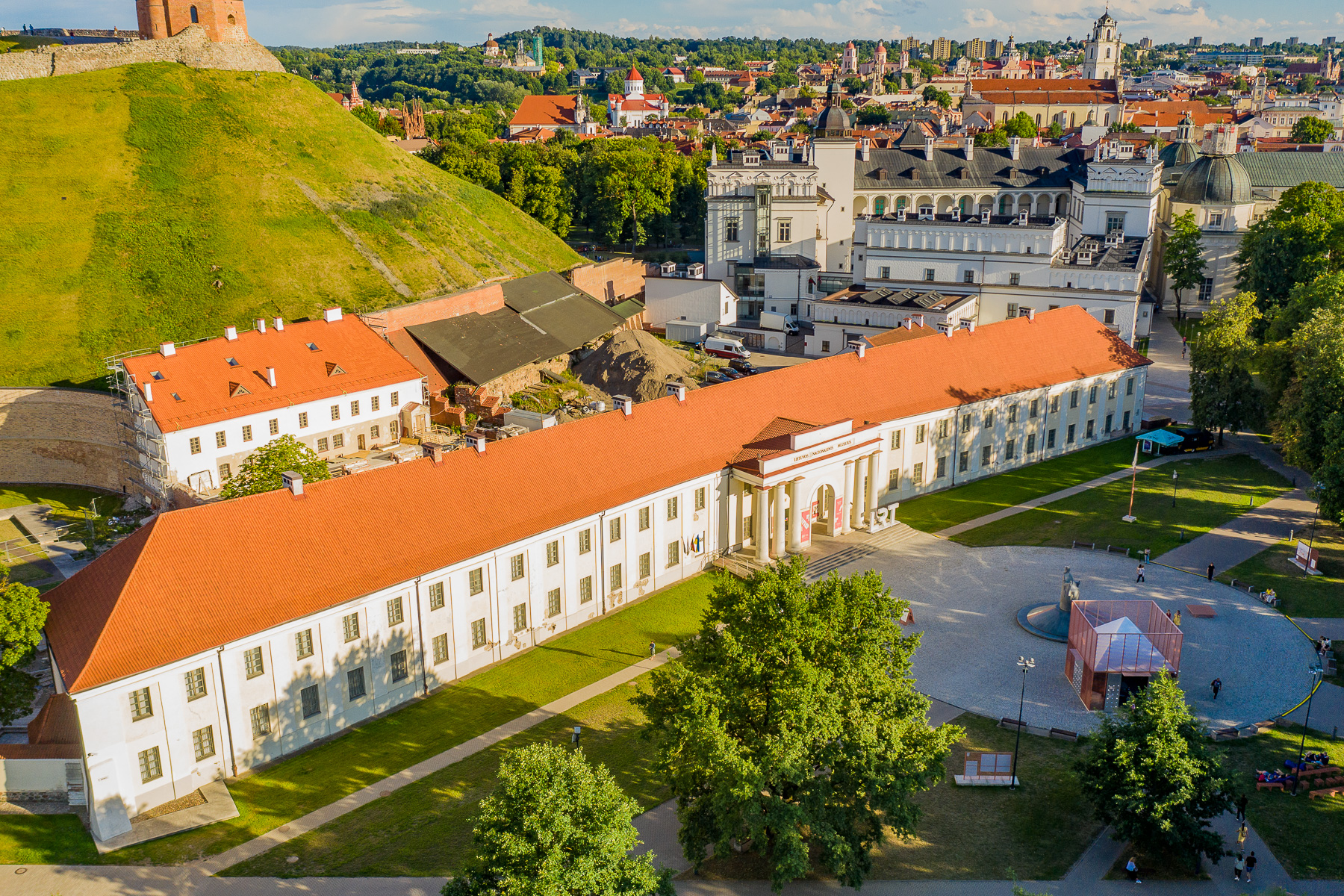
The New Arsenal near the Palace of the Grand Dukes of Lithuania

The Museum of Antiquities in Vilnius, founded by Eustachy Tyszkiewicz in 1855, was the forerunner of today's museum. At its inception, the museum focused on the culture and history of the Lithuanian Grand Duchy. Made up mostly of Polish private collections, it was quite popular and received many visitors. After the January Uprising of 1863, the Russian Empire moved much of the collection to Moscow; the remaining collections were re-organized and were incorporated into the Vilnius Public Library. From 1866 to 1914, the museum and the library operated together. In 1915, when the Eastern Front of World War I approached Vilnius, more of the exhibits was taken to Russia.

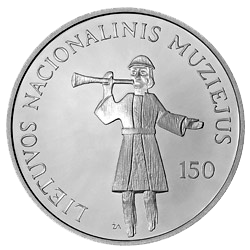
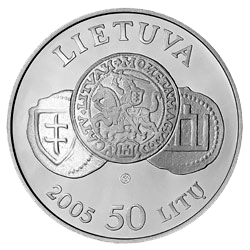
Litas commemorative coin dedicated to the 150th anniversary of the National Museum of Lithuania

After Lithuanian independence was established in 1918, the Museum of History and Ethnography was founded, based on the collections in the Museum of Antiquities and the Lithuanian Scientific Society. Its director was Jonas Basanavičius, one of the signatories to the Act of Independence of Lithuania. After 1919, Vilnius became part of Poland, and the organization was incorporated into Vilnius University.

In 1941, the Academy of Sciences acquired the collections of all the museums in Vilnius. The museum again became a separate entity in 1952 under the direction of the historian Vincas Žilėnas. In 1967, the museum established itself at the Vilnius Castle Complex's New Arsenal.

The museum hosted a major exposition in 1968. During the 1970s and 1980s historic materials from across the country were gathered. In 1992, after Lithuania re-established its independence, it was renamed the National Museum of Lithuania. It is now part of the Ministry of Culture.

== Organization ==
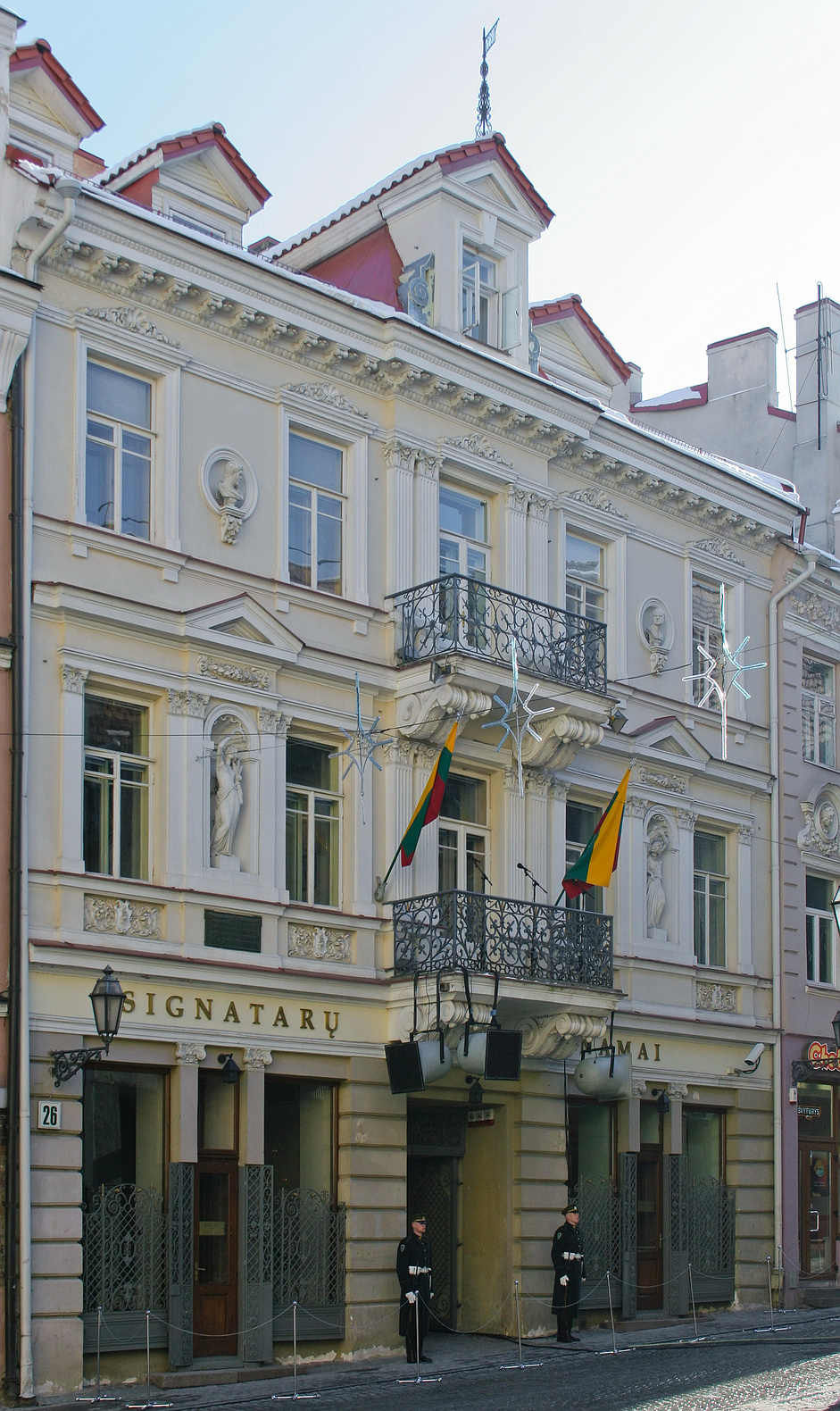
The House of the Signatories houses a part of the museum's collections

The museum has five main departments: History and Latest History, Archaeology, Ethnography, Numismatics, and Iconography, containing a total of 800,000 items.

The collections are housed at:

- New Arsenal at the Vilnius Castle Complex
- Old Arsenal at the Vilnius Castle Complex
- Gediminas Tower in Vilnius
- Bastion of Vilnius Defensive Wall
- Kazys Varnelis House-Museum
- House of the Signatories in Vilnius
- Vincas Kudirka Museum in the Šakiai district
- Jonas Basanavičius Birthplace in the Vilkaviškis district
- Memorial Homestead of Jonas Šliūpas in Palanga

Additional departments belonging to the institution are the Department of Information and Education, the Department for Displays Registration and Preservation, the Département for Restoration and the Department of Publishing.
