= Adam Kirkor =

Polish publisher, journalist

Adam Honory Kirkor
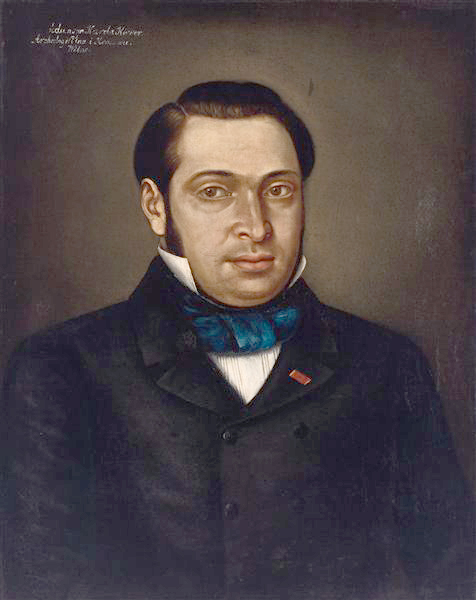
- Born: 21 January 1818; Slivino, Russian Empire
- Died: 23 November 1886 (aged 68); Kraków, Grand Duchy of Kraków
- Occupations: Publisher, journalist, archaeologist

Adam Honory Kirkor (21 January 1818 – 23 November 1886) was a Polish publisher, journalist and archeologist.

== Biography ==
Kirkor was born in Slivino on 21 January 1818, finishing school in Mogilev. From 1834 to 1866, he worked in Vilnius, later in Saint Petersburg and Kraków. He was a member of the Vilnius Archaeological Commission from 1855. In 1859, Kirkor bought a printing house from Christian Theophilus Glücksberg and started printing books and periodicals in Polish, Lithuanian and Russian.

Kirkor became a member of the Russian Imperial Archaeological Society in 1856, taking part in the writing of Orgelbrand's Universal Encyclopedia. His name is featured in the first volume of the encyclopedia. He joined the Moscow Archaeological Society in 1864.

He was not financially successful and went bankrupt, eventually moving to Kraków. Kirkor helped transforming the Kraków Scientific Society into the Academy of Learning, to which he was appointed as member of in 1873. From 1875, he started participating in archaeological excavations near Kraków.

Adam was married to Helena Kirkorowa until 1857 due to her leaving him for another man. After the divorce, he married Maria Celestyna Boczkowska.

== See also ==
- Orgelbrand's Universal Encyclopedia (1859)
