= Konstanty Tyszkiewicz =

Polish-Lithuanian noble, archaeologist and ethnographer

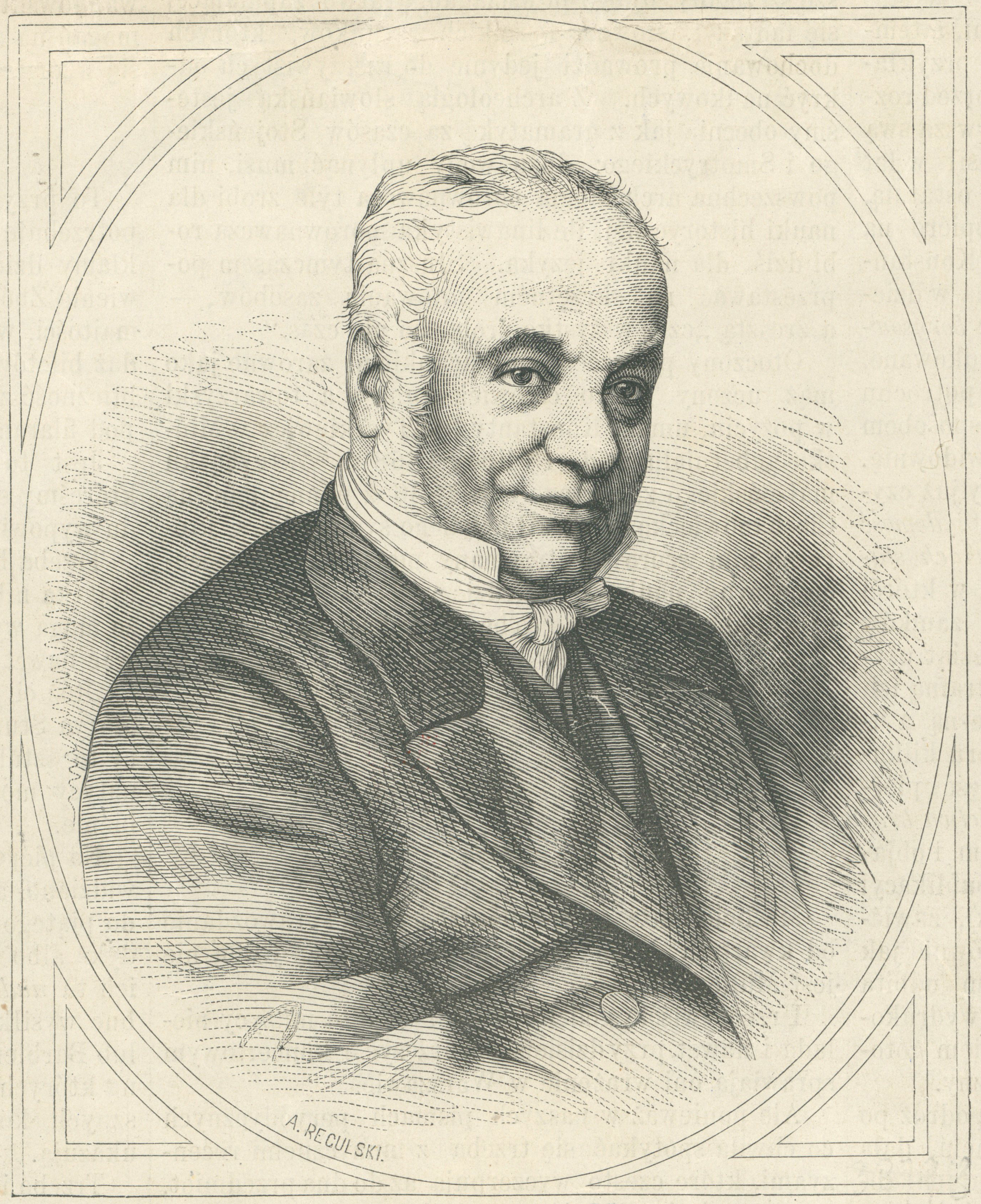
Konstanty Tyszkiewicz

Count Konstanty Tyszkiewicz (Lithuanian: Konstantinas Tiškevičius; 1806 in Lahojsk – 1868) was a Polish-Lithuanian noble, archaeologist and ethnographer.

He studied the history of Grand Duchy of Lithuania. He was also the brother of Eustachy Tyszkiewicz.
