= Nikolai Tikhobrazov =

Russian painter

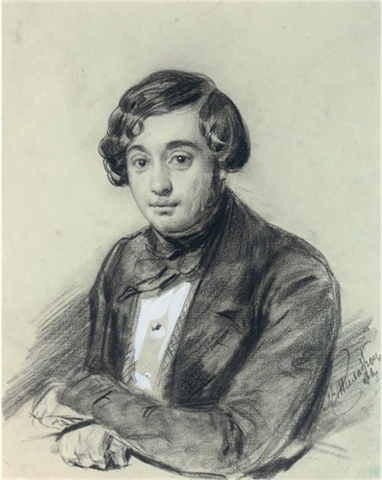
- Nikolai Tikhobrazov in his youth (1840)
- Born: March 23, 1818; Novgorod Governorate
- Died: December 14, 1874 (aged 56); Saint Petersburg
- Education: Member Academy of Arts (1852); Professor by rank (1859)
- Alma mater: Imperial Academy of Arts
- Known for: Painting
- Awards: Big Gold Medal of the Imperial Academy of Arts (1845)

Nikolai Tikhobrazov (1818–1874) was a Russian painter, known primarily for his history paintings and genre scenes. He studied at the Academy in St. Petersburg under Karl Bryullov, gaining the title of Academician in his own right in 1852.

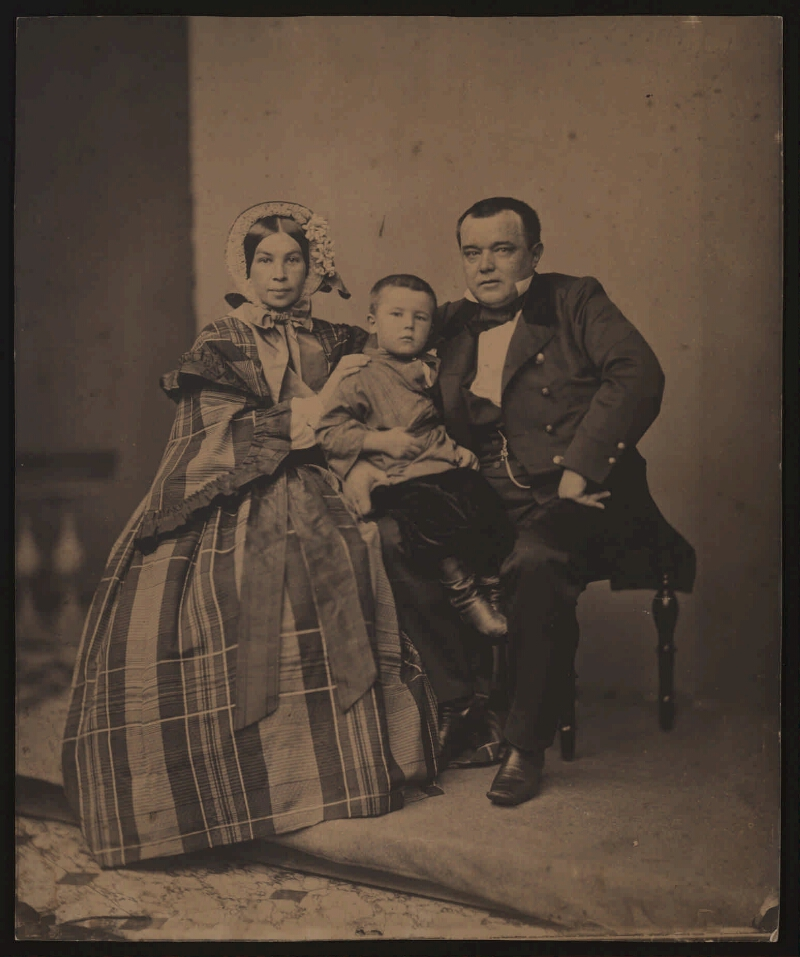
Nikolai Tikhobrazov with his wife and son Alexander (1847)

== Biography ==
He received his art education by attending classes at the Imperial Academy of Arts starting from 1835. He was a disciple of Karl Bryullov. During his studies, he earned a small silver medal in 1840, two small silver medals in 1841, and a small gold medal in 1843. He graduated in 1845, receiving a large gold medal for his work Christ Expels the Merchants from the Temple.

After completing his studies, he embarked on a trip abroad, eventually settling in Rome in 1847. He returned to Russia in 1849 and took up residence in St. Petersburg, where he focused on his creative pursuits and teaching drawing. In 1852, he was awarded the title of academician for his painting Woman in Albanian Costume Sitting at the Sewing Work.

In addition to painting pictures, he also engaged in monumental painting, creating works such as iconostases, wall panels, and decorative paintings for interiors. He achieved the title of Professor within the Academy of Arts in 1859.

During the 1860s, Tikhobazov established and operated a photographic workshop in St. Petersburg.

He died on December 14 (26), 1874, in Petersburg and was laid to rest in the Novodevichy Cemetery. His artworks can be found in the Tretyakov Gallery and the Pushkin State Museum.

== Selected paintings ==
Nikolai Tikhobrazov's paintings

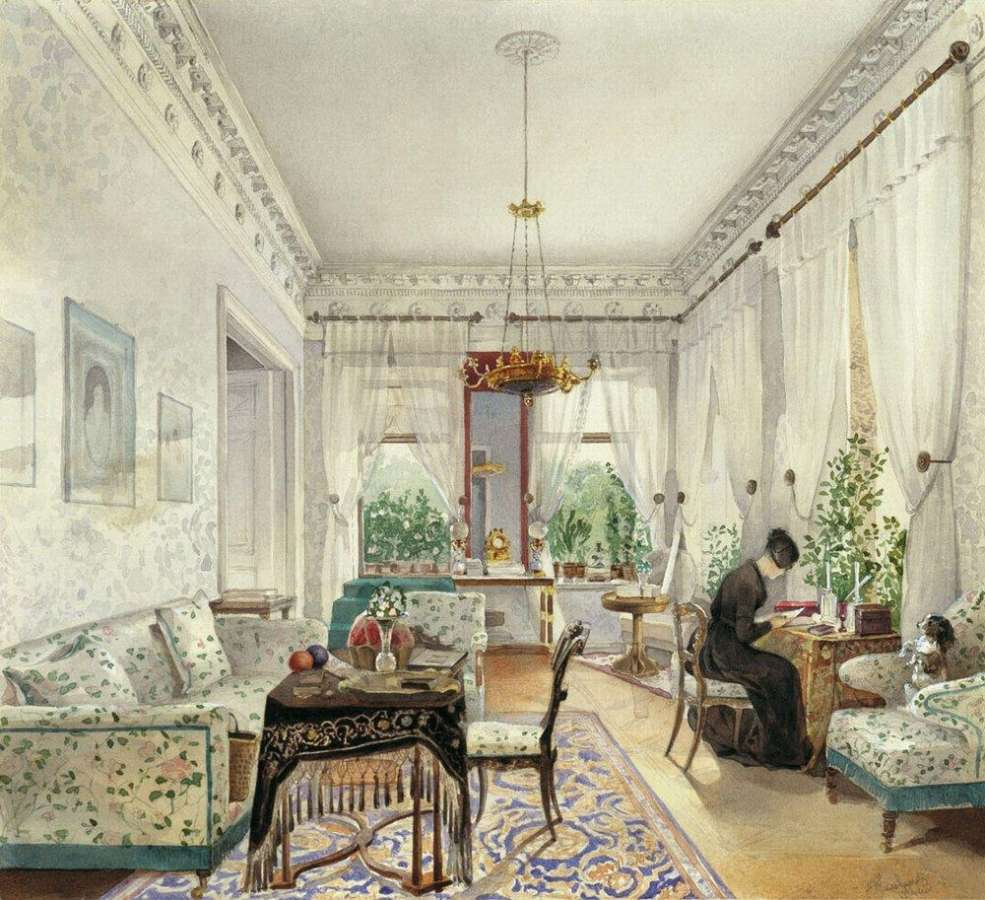
The interior of the estate Lopukhins (1844)

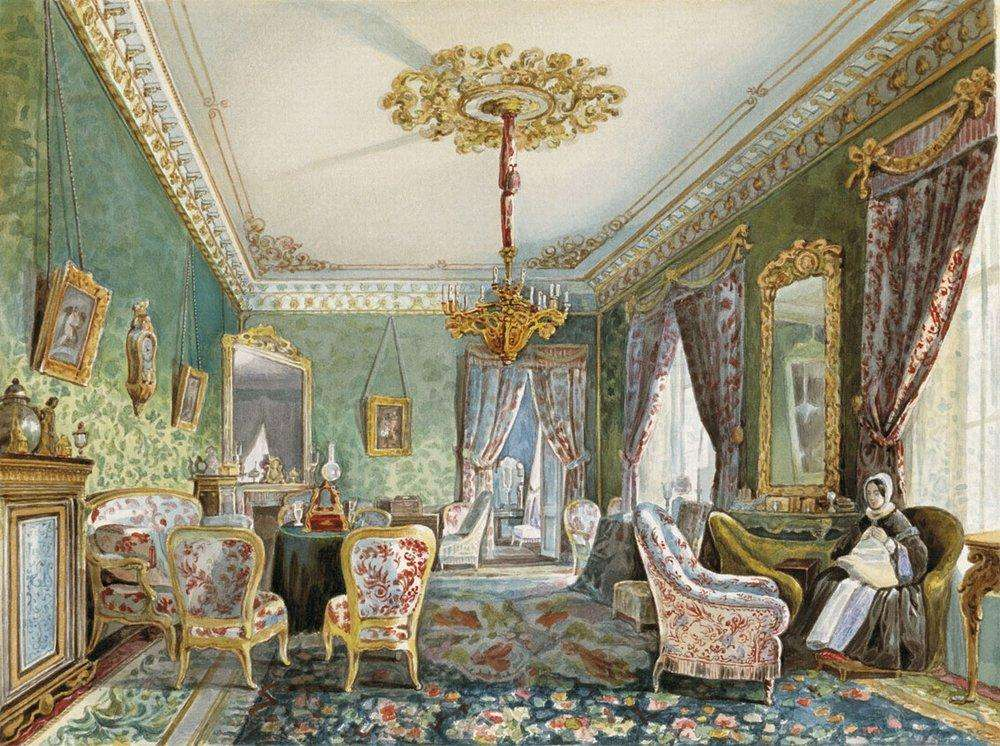
Interior in Petersburg (1844)

== Literary sources ==
- С. Н. Кондаков (1915). Юбилейный справочник Императорской Академии художеств. 1764-1914 (in Russian). Vol. 2. p. 196.
- Russian Portrait [sic] of the 18th and 19th century (exhibition catalog). Moscow, 1976.
