= Imperial Russian Archaeological Society =

Archaeological society in the Russian Empire

The Imperial Russian Archaeological Society (Императорское Русское археологическое общество), originally known as the Archaeological-Numismatic Society, was an archaeological society in the Russian Empire. It was founded in St. Petersburg in 1846.

== Selected publications ==
- Первый отчет Археологическо-нумизматического общества в Санкт-Петербурге. Заседания 1-5. — СПб., 1847.
- Mémoires de la société archéologique et de numismatique de St.-Petersburg (1847–1852). — Вып. 1—6.
- Перечень трудов и действий С.-Петербургского археологическо-нумизматического общества с половины 1846 по 1 генваря 1849 года. — СПб., 1849.
- Записки Санкт-Петербургского археолого-нумизматического общества (1847–1858) — 14 томов.
- Известия Русского археологического общества. Тома 1-10. — СПб., 1859–1884.
- Записки Русского археологического общества (Записки новой серии). — СПб., 1886–1902–12 томов.
- Медали присужденные Русским археологическим обществом в первое пятидесятилетие его существования. — СПб., 1899.

== See also ==
- Imperial Russian Historical Society
- Moscow Archeological Society
