= FK Širvėna Biržai =

Lithuanian football club

Širvėna
- Full name: Futbolo klubas "Širvėna"
- Founded: 1948; 78 years ago
- Ground: Biržai Stadium
- Capacity: 1,000
- Coordinates: 56°12′10″N 24°45′30″E
- Chairman: Vytautas Stanulevičius
- Manager: Mantas Pomeckis
- League: II Lyga (3rd level)
- 2025: 13th
- Website: https://www.facebook.com/fksirvena/
Home colours	Away colours

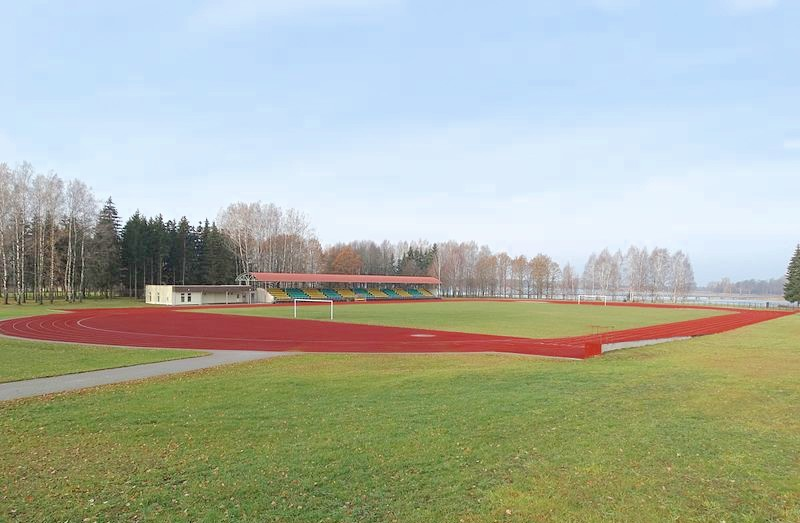
Stadium in Biržai (Biržų centrinis stadionas)

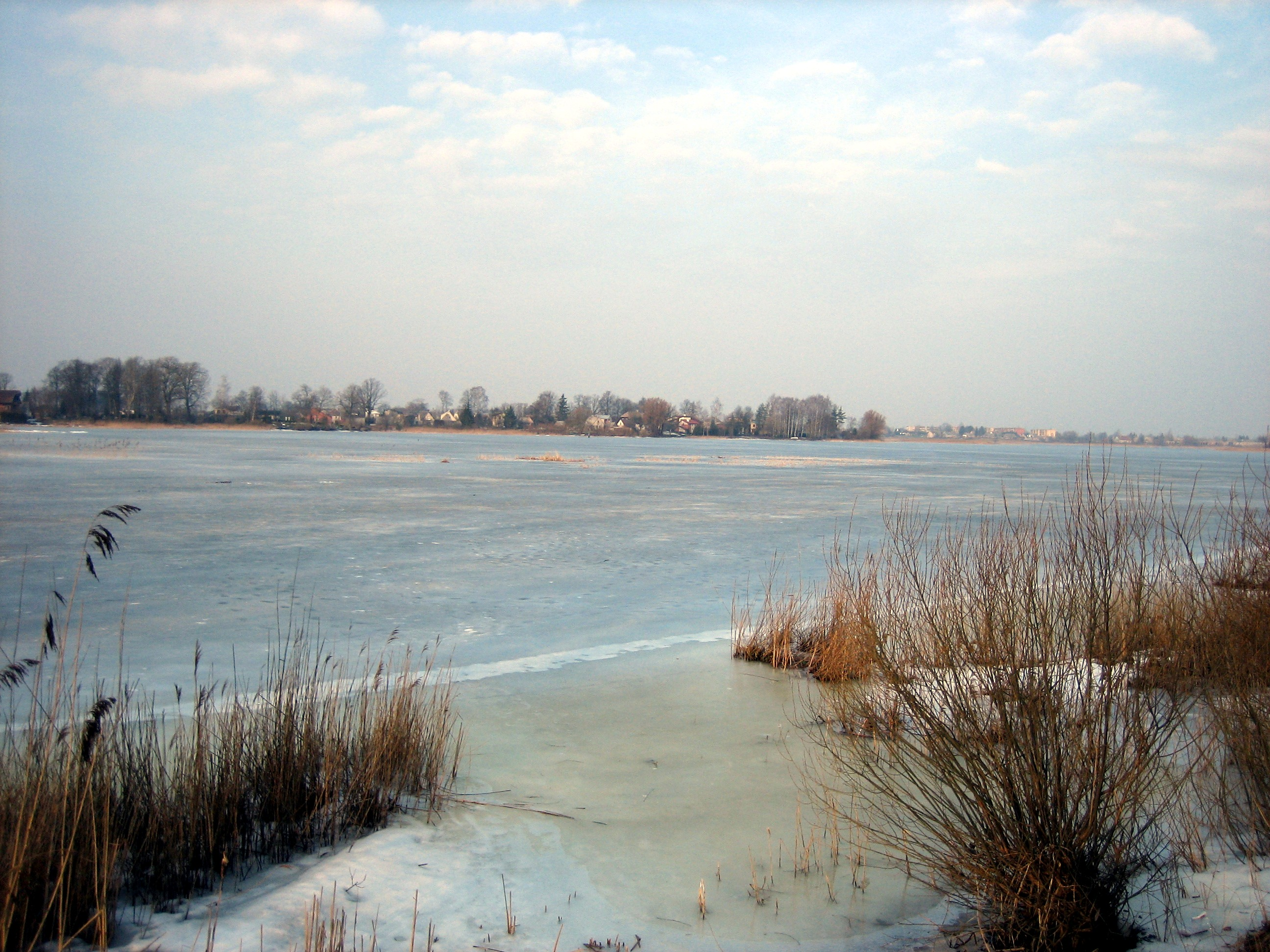
Širvėna lake in winter time

Futbolo klubas Širvėna, commonly known as Širvėna, is a Lithuanian football club located in Biržai, center of Biržai District. They played in the II Lyga, Western zone, the third tier of Lithuanian football from 2013 to 2018. In Soviet occupations, it was in Pirma lyga (second tier).

== History ==
Club was created in 1948 as part of the republican sports union "Žalgiris". From 1954 club was renamed "Siūlas" by the sponsorship reasons.

During the Soviet occupation in Lithuania, the ownership and sponsorship of the club was consistently changing.

The team's "Silver age" was five seasons, year after year, when in 1953, 1954, 1955, 1956, 1957 became runners-up in "B" klasė (second tier) championship.

In 1978 and 1984 seasons in team played currently well known football manager Saulius Širmelis.

In 1990, the club was resurrected. In 1991 changed name to Širvėna. From 2003 a general sponsor was "Rinkuškiai" brewery. For sponsorship reasons club was renamed to "Rinkuškiai".

In 2013 club come back to II Lyga, Western zone, the third tier of Lithuanian football.

Before 2015 season head of the club promised fight for medals.

In 2015, the club won the Western zone and had chances play in Pirma lyga (2nd tier), but they stayed in II Lyga.

In 2019 passed any competition and LFF Cup tournament.

== What means Širvėna name ==
Lake Širvėna in Biržai. This lake is not natural. When was built Biržai Castle on the Agluona and Apaščia rivers at their confluence, and the artificial Lake Širvėna, covering about 40 km^{2}, was created. Major castle building works were finished in 1589.

First time club was renamed Širvėna in 1965. Second time in 1991 and last time in 2013.

== Historical names ==
- 1948 – Žalgiris
- 1954 – Siūlas
- 1955 – Kooperatininkas
- 1957 – MTS
- 1959 – MMS
- 1960 – Siūlas
- 1963 – Vairas
- 1965 – Širvėna
- 1968 – Siūlas
- 1972 – Statybininkas
- 1975 – Nemunas
- 1977 – Medis
- 1979 – Statybininkas
- 1980 – Medis
- 1987 – Rovėja
- 1991 – Širvėna
- 2003 – Rinkuškiai
- 2013 – Širvėna

== Honours ==
The club's honours in soviet occupation period (Played in "B" klasė (second tier) and in an independent Lithuania period (since 1990).

=== Domestic ===
- (Lithuania) B klasė:
  - Runners-up (5): 1953, 1954, 1955, 1956, 1957

Recent seasons team play in II Lyga West Zone championship.

- (Lithuania) II Lyga West Zone
  - Winners (1): 2015
  - Runners-up (2): 2001, 2017

== Recent seasons ==
Season	Level	Division	Position	Movements
2010	Tier 4	Trečia lyga (Panevėžys)	2nd	
2011	Tier 4	Trečia lyga (Panevėžys)	2nd	
2012	Tier 4	Trečia lyga (Panevėžys)	1st	↑ Promoted ↑
2013	Tier 3	Antra lyga (Vakarų zona)	3rd	
2014	Tier 3	Antra lyga (Vakarų zona)	6th	
2015	Tier 3	Antra lyga (Vakarų zona)	1st	
2016	Tier 3	Antra lyga (Vakarų zona)	7th	
2017	Tier 3	Antra lyga (Vakarų zona)	2nd	
2018	Tier 3	Antra lyga (Vakarų zona)	8th	
2019	X	X	X	Not played
2020	X	X	X	Not played
2021	Tier 4	Trečia lyga (Panevėžys)	4th	
2024	Tier 3	Antra lyga	12th	
2025	Tier 3	Antra lyga	13th	

↑ Promoted	↓ Relegated

== Kit evoliution ==
1991-2002 (Home)	1991-2002 (Away)	2003-2012 (Home)	2013-2014 (Home kit)	2015-2017 (Home kit)	2018 (Home kit)	Goalkeepers kit 2018

=== Colors ===
Black, white and red.

ŠIRVĖNA	ŠIRVĖNA	ŠIRVĖNA

== Crest ==
- In "Rinkuškiai" period (2003–2012) crest was the same as "Rinkuškiai" brewery's.
- In 2013 logo was changed. Eagle in logo the same like in flag and coat arms of Biržai town.

== Stadium ==
Club play their home matches in Biržai Stadium (lt. Biržų miesto stadionas). The current capacity of the stadium is 1,000 seats.

== Current squad ==
As of 26 January 2026

Note: Flags indicate national team as defined under FIFA eligibility rules; some limited exceptions apply. Players may hold more than one non-FIFA nationality.

No.	Pos.	Nation	Player
1	GK	LTU	Armandas Indrašius
12	DF	LTU	Deividas Kuodis
20	DF	LTU	Simonas Laužikas
21	DF	LTU	Laurynas Šatas
23	DF	LTU	Tomas Sirevičius
2	MF	LTU	Donatas Paulauskas
5	MF	LTU	Ignas Peikštenis
10	MF	LTU	Tautvydas Švelna
17	MF	LTU	Gailius Lansbergas (captain)
22	MF	LTU	Vaidas Kavaliauskas
18	FW	LTU	Ignas Kurklietis
11	FW	LTU	Marius Ligeika

No.	Pos.	Nation	Player
15		LTU	Mantas Bartuškevičius
7		LTU	Mindaugas Jakštas
—		LTU	Bartas Lansbergas
—		LTU	Karolis Bakūnas
3		LTU	Karolis Kazokaitis
—		LTU	Mantas Jokšas
—		LTU	Aldas Barisevičius
—		LTU	Deivydas Balčiūnas
—		LTU	Andrius Vitulis
14		LTU	Edvinas Užinskas
4		LTU	Armandas Užinskas
15		LTU	Marius Zabarauskas
