= Juozas Kalinauskas =

Lithuanian sculptor and medalist

Sculptor, medallist Juozas Kalinauskas

Juozas Kalinauskas (born January 24, 1935) is a Lithuanian sculptor and medalist.

== Biography ==
Kalinauskas graduated from Vištytis middle school in 1950, and then from 1950 to 1955 studied in Stepas Žukas art school in Kaunas. From 1955 to 1961, he studied in the Lithuanian State Art Institute Vilnius, and graduated with a diploma as a sculptor. Since 1962, he has been a member of the Lithuanian Artists' Association. From 1962 to 1970, he was art director of the magazine Vilnius fashion house "Banga".

In 1985, he was granted the honorary name of merited artist.

- 1996 — Member of the International federation of medals FIDEM.
- 2006 — Member of the medalist association AIAM in Rome.
- Participating in exhibitions since 1960.

== Art work ==
=== Sculpture ===
- 1960 — "Šokėjėlė" high relief, music theatre in Kaunas;
- 1961 — "Rest" relief, drill factory in Vilniaus;
- 1964–1965 — "After work" bas-relief, gesso 46x101cm, Lithuanian National Museum of Art;
- 1965 — "In sauna" embossed copper, 50x100cm, Museum of fine arts in Moscow;
- 1967 — "Olympian light" triptych, bas-relief 1x4,5 meters embossed copper, Lithuanian National Museum of Art;
- 1969 — "Eglė" elm, height – 54 cm;
- 1969–1970 — "Greeting of cosmonaut" embossed copper, 190x170 cm;
- 1972 — "Family" bronze, 23 cm;
  - "Youth" marble, 100x140 cm;
  - "Near the sea" elm, height – 50 cm;
- 1975 — "Shield of the sun" embossed copper, Ø – 1 meter;
  - "Gymnast with ribbons" relief, embossed copper, diameter 100 cm;
- 1976 — "Women's figure" mahogany, height – 53 cm;
  - "Lying" mahogany, 31x65x23 cm;
  - "Venus" mahogany, height – 52 cm;
  - "A girl with a ball" mahogany, 26x56 cm, Tretyakov state gallery of fine arts, Moscow;
- 1978 — "Figure" mahogany, 54x28x22 cm;
- 1981 — "Muse" façade of the Gniecno music school in Moscow, authors: J.Kalinauskas, A.Zokaitis;
- 1983 — „Partisans” monument, co-author Algirdas Zokaitis, architect G. Baravykas, bronze, 5 meters high;
- 1984 — „Linutė” bust, bronze, height – 26 cm, Tretyakov state gallery of fine arts, Moscow;
  - „Linutė” bust, elm, height – 26 cm;
- 1990 — „Germantas” bust, bronze, height – 45 cm;
  - „Aida”, “Eglė, queen of grassnakes”, „Otelo” façade of the Lithuanian National Opera and Ballet Theatre in Vilnius, height – 3,2 m;
  - „President of Lithuania Antanas Smetona" bas-relief, bronze, height – 42 cm, on independence memorial stela, Vištytis;
- 1996 — "Sacrifice" bronze, 26x56 cm;
  - "Schullman" bust, bronze, base – marble, height – 64 cm, USA, New Jersey;
- 2003 — "Morning" bronze, 55x26x24 cm;
- 2005 — "Themis" bronze, height – 60 cm, base – granite;
- 2006 — "Botanist" bronze, height – 45 cm, base – marble;
- 2010 — "600 years to the battle of Žalgiris-Grünwald" co-author Lina Kalinauskaitė, bas-relief, copper, 255x363, 255x726 mm.

=== Medals ===
- 1964 — "Revolt in Lithuania in the year 1863" head, reverse, electrotype, Ø 16 cm;
- 1965 — "M.K. Čiurlionis" head, reverse, electrotype, Ø 22 cm;
- 1973 — "The legend of the foundation of Vilnius" copper, electrotype, Ø 16 cm;
- 1974 — "Ina" medallion, silver, 5x6 cm;
- 1978 — "Skaidrė" medallion, electrotype, Ø 8 cm;
- 1979 — "Vilnius Model house" aluminium, Ø 12 cm;
- 1980 — "M.K. Čiurlionis" medallion, silvered copper, 4x5 cm;
- 1982 — "Goda" copper, electrotype, 12x15 cm;
- 1987 — "In memoriam of professor B. Pundzius" copper, electrotype, Ø 16 cm;
- 1993 — "Anniversary of Vilnius – 670 years" head, reverse, electrotype. Ø18 cm;
- 1994 — "Lithuanian President Kazys Grinius" copper, electrotype, Ø 19 cm;
  - "Lithuanian Premier Adolfas Šleževičius" averse, electrotype, Ø 22 cm;
  - "Lithuanian Minister of Transport Jonas Biržiškis" averse, electrotype, Ø 19 cm;
  - "Member of Lithuanian Parlament A. Albertynas" portraiture, copper, electrotype, Ø 19 cm;
- 1996 — "Dr. Kazys Bobelis" head, bronze, Ø 190 mm;
- 1997 — "Anniversary of Vilkaviškis – 300 years" head, reverse, brass, Ø 22 cm, Lithuanian Mint;
  - "In memorial of Arūnas Tarabilda" head, reverse, silvered copper, Ø 20 cm;
- 2000 — "Evelina Malinauskaitė" electrotype, Ø 16 cm;
  - "Tomas Malinauskas" electrotype, Ø 16 cm;
  - "Algirdė" medallion, silvered copper, Ø 6 cm;
  - "Jubilee Medal of Millennium" head, reverse, brass, silver Ag 925, Ø 51 mm, Lithuanian Mint;
- 2001 — "The Medal for the Christian World" head, reverse, brass, silver Ag 925, Ø 51 mm, Lithuanian Mint;
- 2002 — "World champion Rimantas Bagdonas" head, reverse, brass, Ø 51 mm, Lithuanian Mint;
  - "Vice-chairman of Lithuanian Republic Česlovas Juršėnas" copper, Ø 200 mm;
  - "Lithuanias christian democracy party celebrates its 100 years" head, reverse, brass, Ø 51 mm, Lithuanian Mint;
  - "Maldis art gallery opening, oeuvre of Sauka" head, reverse, brass, Ø 51 mm, Lithuanian Mint;
- 2003 — "Artist R. Dichavičius", bronze, marble, Ø 16 cm;
  - "Woman and a cat" brass, 9x12 cm;
  - "Jubilee medal for Lithuanian King Mindaugas" head, reverse, brass, silver Ag 925, Ø 51 mm, Lithuanian Mint;
- 2004 — "Jubilee medal for Lithuanian Queen Morta" head, reverse, brass, silver Ag 925, Ø 51 mm, Lithuanian Mint;
- 2005 — "Edmundas Armoška 60 years jubilee" head, reverse, brass, Ø 51 mm, Lithuanian Mint;
  - "Dr. Pranas Kiznis ♦ Lietpak – 15 years jubilee" head, reverse, brass, Ø 51 mm, Lithuanian Mint;
- 2006 — "Jubilee medal 770 years to battle of Saulė-Šiauliai" head, reverse, brass, silver Ag 925, Ø 51 mm, Lithuanian Mint;
  - "Radvila the Black" co-author Lina Kalinauskaitė, head, reverse, brass, silver Ag 925, Ø 51 mm, Lithuanian Mint;
  - "Archangel Michael" co-author Lina Kalinauskaitė, head, reverse, brass, silver Ag 925, Ø 51 mm, Lithuanian Mint;
- 2007 — "Archangel Gabriel" co-author Lina Kalinauskaitė, head, reverse, brass, silver Ag 925, Ø 51 mm, Lithuanian Mint;
  - "Archangel Raphael" co-author Lina Kalinauskaitė, head, reverse, brass, silver Ag 925, Ø 51 mm, Lithuanian Mint;
- 2009 — "Medal Signifying the Millennium Commemoration of the Name of Lithuania 1009–2009" co-author Lina Kalinauskaitė, head, reverse, brass, silver Ag 925, Ø 70mm, Lithuanian Mint;
- 2010 — "Jubilee medal 600 years to the battle of Žalgiris-Grünwald" co-author Lina Kalinauskaitė, obverse, reverse, brass, silver Ag 925, Ø 51 mm, Lithuanian Mint.

== Public and private collections ==
- "Olympic light" — Lithuanian National Museum of Art, Vilnius;
- "Gymnast with ribbons" — A. Grenda's private collection;
- "Sacrifice" —Mrs. Fokienė private collection, Vilnius;
- "Near the sea" — Association of Lithuanian writers, Vilnius;
- "In sauna", "The legend of the foundation of Vilnius" — Museum of fine arts, Moscow;
- "Linute", "Youth" — Tretyakov state gallery of fine arts, Moscow;
- "Dr. J.Schulman" — private collection of Mrs. E. Schulman, United States, New Jersey;
- "Algirdas and Kęstutis" — private collection, Japan;
- Various historical medals at Trakai history museum, Trakai;
- And other private collections in Lithuania and abroad.

== Exhibitions ==
- 1965 — Anniversary exhibition of art in Vilnius;
- 1966 — Competitive exhibition of Lithuania;
- 1967 — Republican exhibition in Vilnius;
- 1969–1970 — International exhibition of medals in Prague;
- 1972 — Quadrienal in Riga;
- 1972 — Personal exhibition in Vilnius;
- 1975 — Kraków, international exhibition of medals;
- 1976 — Quadrienal in Riga;
- 1984 — Confederate exhibition in Moscow;
- 1985 — GTG exhibition in Moscow;
- 1985 — GKG exhibition in Moscow;
- 1986–1987 — exhibition in Moscow;
- 1987–1988 — II Republican exhibition in Vilnius;
- 1991 — III Republican exhibition in Vilnius;
- 1993 — Republican exhibition of medals in Vilnius;
- 1994 — September, personal exhibition in Vilkaviskis, Krastieciu hall;
- 1998 — November, personal exhibition in Vilnius, Atzalynas club hall;
- 1998 — Medal exhibition FIDEM in Netherlands;
- 2002 — Medal exhibition FIDEM in Paris;
- 2002 — Sculpture symposium at the St. Jono gallery, Vilnius;
- 2000–2005 — Medal exhibitions at the St. Jono gallery, Vilnius;
- 2006 — Personal exhibition at the St. Jono gallery, Vilnius;
- 2007 — VII Baltic Medal Triennial, Vilnius;
- 2007 — FIDEM in Colorado Springs USA;
- 2007 — February, exhibition at "Korperhaft-Erotische Impressionen" in Daetz-Centrum, Lichtenstein, Germany;
- 2008 — AIAM medal exhibition in Rome;
- 2009 — May, Exhibition dedicated to commemorate the Millennium of Lithuania's Name at the palace of Radvilu, Vilnius;
- 2009 — September, Exhibition in Vilnius' town hall;
- 2009 — October, Republican exhibition of medals in Vilnius.

== Awards ==
- 1966 — First award for "Olympian light";
- 1966 — Second award for "The fight";
- 1969 — Third award for "Greeting of cosmonaut" in Moscow;
- 1976 — Diploma from Moscow for the medal "The legend of the foundation of Vilnius";
- 1984 — "Grekov name" medal, silver;
- 1985 — Granted an honorary name of merited artist;
- 1993 — Award in competition of the medals, for the medal "Vilnius 670 years".
