= Vidmantas Jažauskas =

Lithuanian artist

Vidmantas Jažauskas (born 30 November 1961 in Biržai, Lithuanian SSR) is a Lithuanian painter, book illustrator, poet, and social activist.

== Biography ==
In 1991, he graduated from the Vilnius Art Institute. He teaches at the Biržai Vladas Jakubėnas Music School.

Since 1982, he has participated in exhibitions. Solo exhibitions were held in Vilnius, Kaunas, Panevėžys, Šiauliai. Since 2000, he has been a member of the Lithuanian Artists' Association. Since 2001, he has been a member and the leader of the Biržai artists group "8+".

== Style and works ==
Jažauskas has written a statement about his art: "I could summarize my creative process with the words of a famous American artist and contemporary realist Alan Katz – "I am one of those painters who just painted while the art world burned..." Also, as in his words – I was only interested in the "universal human content that never changes". In fact, such a position was not formed immediately, because, all the people of my generation (including myself), were effected by the transformation of art forms from modernism to postmodernism, that began after the independence and continues to this day. But thanks to the Internet, I realized that there can not be any contradiction between the words "contemporary" and "realism". Therefore, the artist's temperament, sensuality, the way of seeing his world, the search for harmony and beauty in the surroundings, the humanistic setting, remain the main values of the 21st century. ".

Jažauskas has his own online gallery, where he posts his most recent artworks. He also writes articles about art history and other artists on his page.

== Poetry ==
- "rudens pradžia"; "gegužė"; "vienintelis vasaros eilėraštis", Lietuvos rašytojų sąjungos savaitraštis, 2003-07-25

== See also ==
- List of Lithuanian artists
