= Biržai Castle =

Castle in Biržai, Lithuania

- Biržų pilis (Lithuanian)
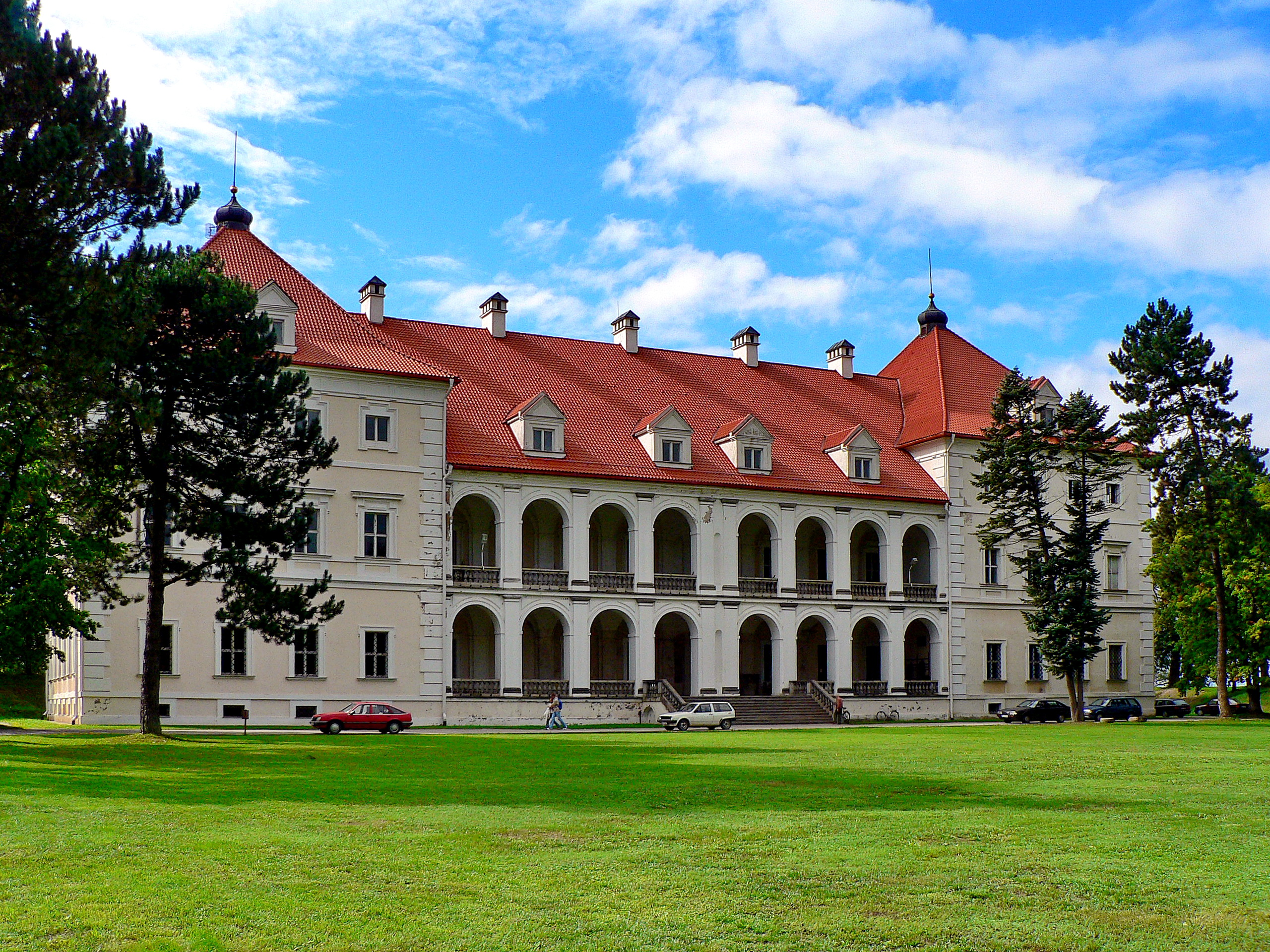
- The manor in the castle of Biržai

- Location within Lithuania
- Interactive map of Biržai Castle
- 56.20°N 24.75°E
- Type: Castle and residential manor
- Location: Biržai, Lithuania

History
- Built: 1575 - 1589
- Built for: Krzysztof Mikołaj "the Lightning" Radziwiłł

Site notes
- Architect(s): Georgas Pirkas, Adam Freytag, Teofilis Krell-Spinovskis
- Architectural style: Renaissance
- Owner: Biržai Region Museum SĖLA
- Website: www.birzumuziejus.lt

Cultural Monuments of Lithuania
- Type: National
- Designated: 24 June 1998
- Reference no.: 1905

Biržai Castle (Lithuanian: Biržų pilis, pronounced [ˈbɪrʒuː pɪɫɪs], Polish: Zamek w Birżach) is a 16th century castle in Biržai, northern Lithuania. It is located in Aukštaitija region, Panevėžys County. The castle was the first Italian-style bastion fort in Lithuania and one of the first in North-Eastern Europe. The well-preserved castle (most recently restored in 2013) now houses a museum, a library and a restaurant.

Construction of the earth bastion-type castle started in 1586 by the order of Krzysztof "Piorun" Radziwiłł. In 1575, preparing for this construction, a dam was built on the Agluona and Apaščia rivers at their confluence, and the artificial Lake Širvėna, covering about 40 km^{2} (15 sq mi), was created. Major works were finished in 1589.

Since the second half of the 17th century, the castle has been the main seat of the Biržai-Dubingiai Radziwiłł (Radvila) family line, which was transferred here from the Dubingiai Castle. Biržai Castle served as an essential Lithuanian stronghold during the wars with Sweden.

The castle was reconstructed from ruins in the 1980s, in the Renaissance-Baroque style. The residential manor of the castle houses a library and a regional history museum "Sėla" (literally Selonia), founded in 1928.

== History ==
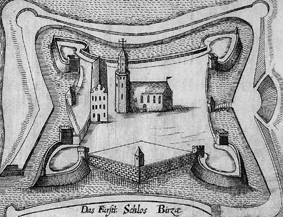
Plan of the Castle in 17th century

Duke Krzysztof Radziwiłł built the largest and strongest, at that time, Italian-style bastion fortress in Lithuania for the protection of his lands and the northern Lithuanian border with Livonia. Works began in 1575 with the construction of a dam at the confluence of the Apasčia and Agluona rivers. In 1586-1589, the embankments were poured. A stately manor house, an Evangelical-Reformed Church, an arsenal and food storehouses, barracks and other buildings were built. The fortress and the town formed an integrated defensive complex. Construction was completed in 1589.

The Grand Duke of Lithuania and King of Poland, Sigismund III Vasa, and later his descendants, did not give up their claim to the Swedish throne and led Lithuania and Poland into years of war with Sweden, during which on 7 August 1625, the castle was besieged by about 8000 Swedish troops. The siege was led by the Swedish King Gustav II Adolf. After a second siege on 7 September 1625, the castle garrison surrendered and the stronghold was destroyed. The Swedes took 60 cannons with them. In 1627, a treaty was signed with the King of Sweden, according to which the castle was returned to the Radvilas.

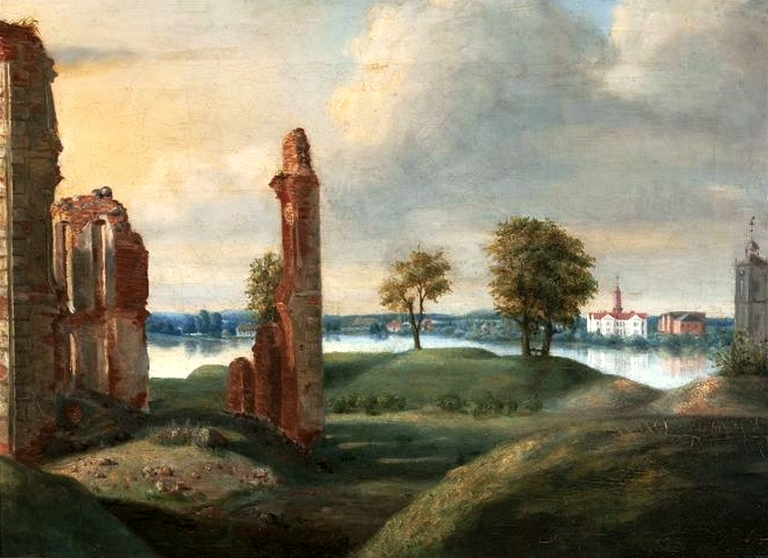
Ruins of the Biržai Castle by Franciszek Smuglewicz (National Museum in Warsaw)

In 1637, Duke Krzysztof II Radziwiłł began a major rebuilding of the fortress, not only restoring the castle but also transforming the type of fortification, replacing the Italian style with the Dutch style. Following the plan of the Dutch bastion castles, the embankments were rebuilt by the architect Georgas Pirkas and a new manor house was built. In 1640, Janusz II Radziwiłł, the future Grand Hetman of Lithuania and son of Krzysztof, inherited Biržai, continued the reconstruction of the castle. In the autumn of 1655, the castle again changed hands and passed to the Swedes. On 20 August 1659, the castle was recaptured by the dragoons of Bogusław Radziwiłł. Between 1659 and 1669, the embankments and the dam were repaired, and a new manor house, barracks, arsenal and gate tower were built according to the design of architect Teofilis Krell-Spinovskis. After the death of Bogusław Radziwiłł in 1669, the last male descendant of the Biržai-Dubingiai branch of the Radvila family, the restoration of the castle ceased. In his will, Bogusław Radziwiłł left all his property to his daughter Ludwika Karolina Radziwiłł. The reconstruction of the fortress was resumed in 1671 and lasted until 1682. The rebuilt stronghold was much larger than the first.

On 26 February 1701, during the Great Northern War, Augustus II the Strong, King of the Polish-Lithuanian Commonwealth and Elector of Saxony, and Peter the Great, Tsar of Russia, signed the anti-Swedish Treaty of Biržai at the castle. In 1704, the Swedish General Adam Ludwig Lewenhaupt's army retook the fortress. The Swedes retreated and blew up the castle and other buildings of the stronghold.

In 1811 Biržai Castle passed to the Tyszkiewicz family. In 1822, the Emperor Alexander I of Russia ordered the preservation of the castle's remains. At the end of the 19th century and the beginning of the 20th century, a garden was planted in the courtyard. In 1931 a sculptural bust of Jonušas Radvila was erected (sculptor Juozas Zikaras). In 1955-62 the remains of the manor house were conserved, in 1978-86 the castle was restored; in 1989 the Biržai Region Museum SĖLA was opened there.

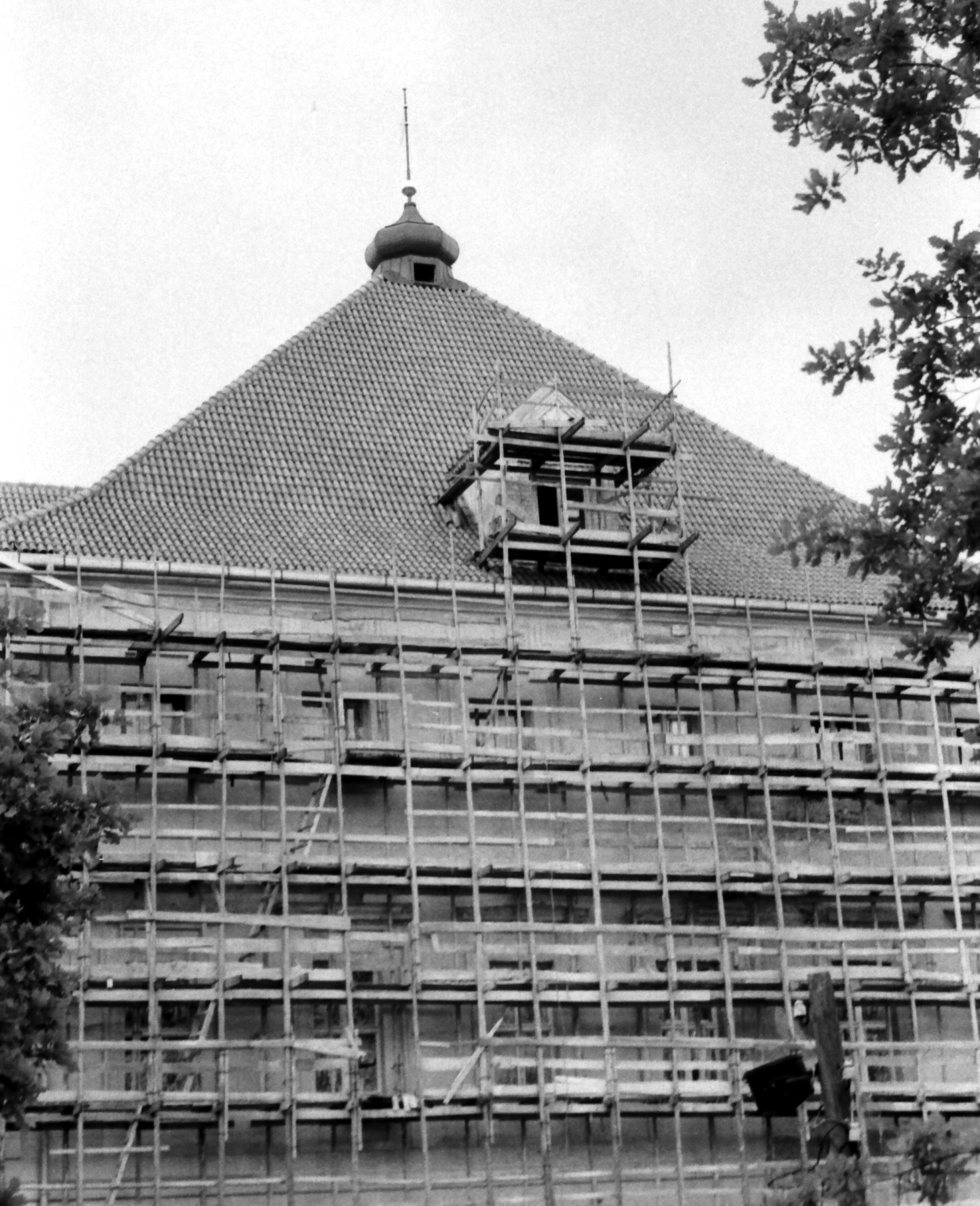
Castle restoration in 1985.

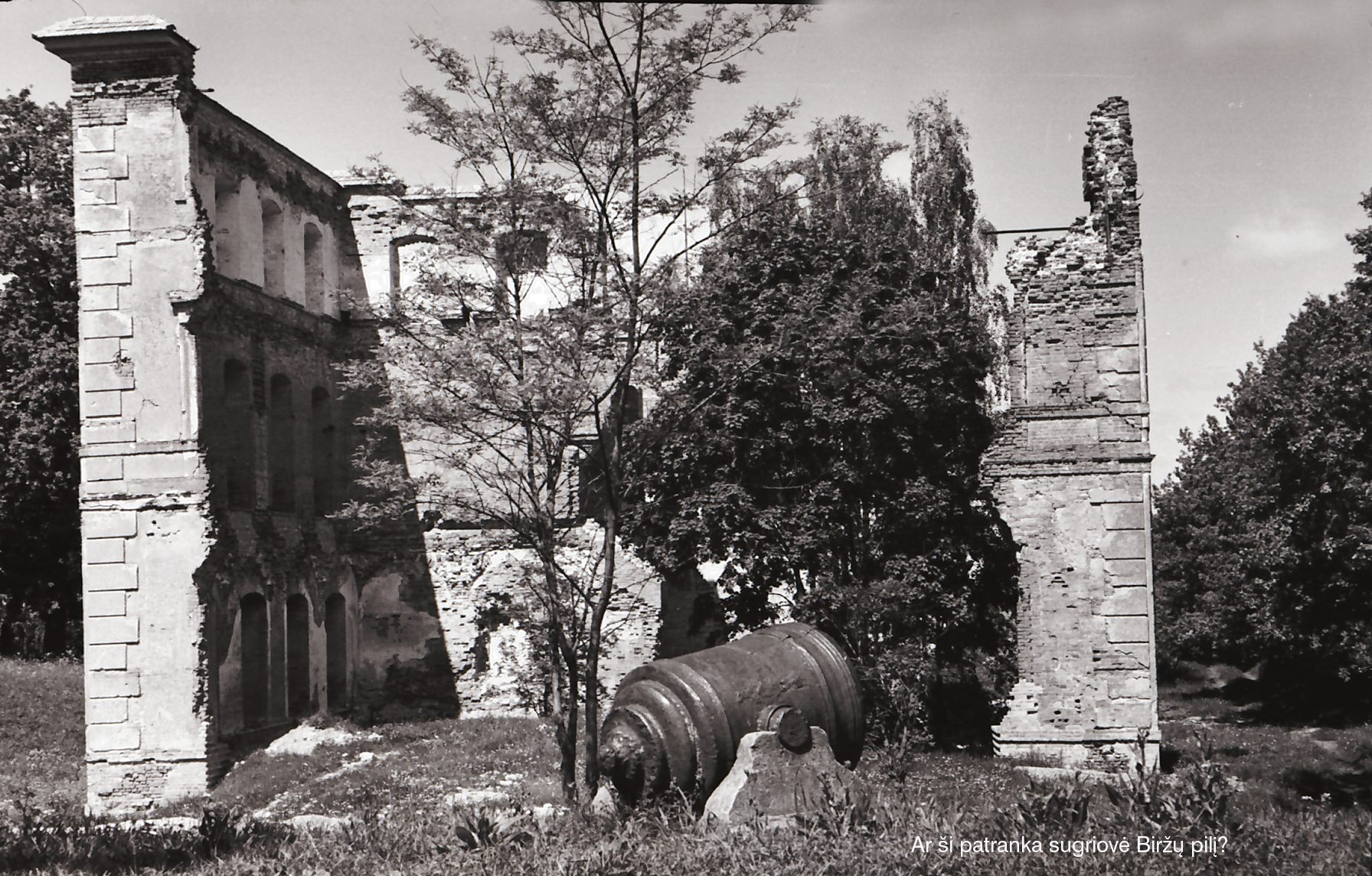
Ruins of the Biržai Castle in 1954

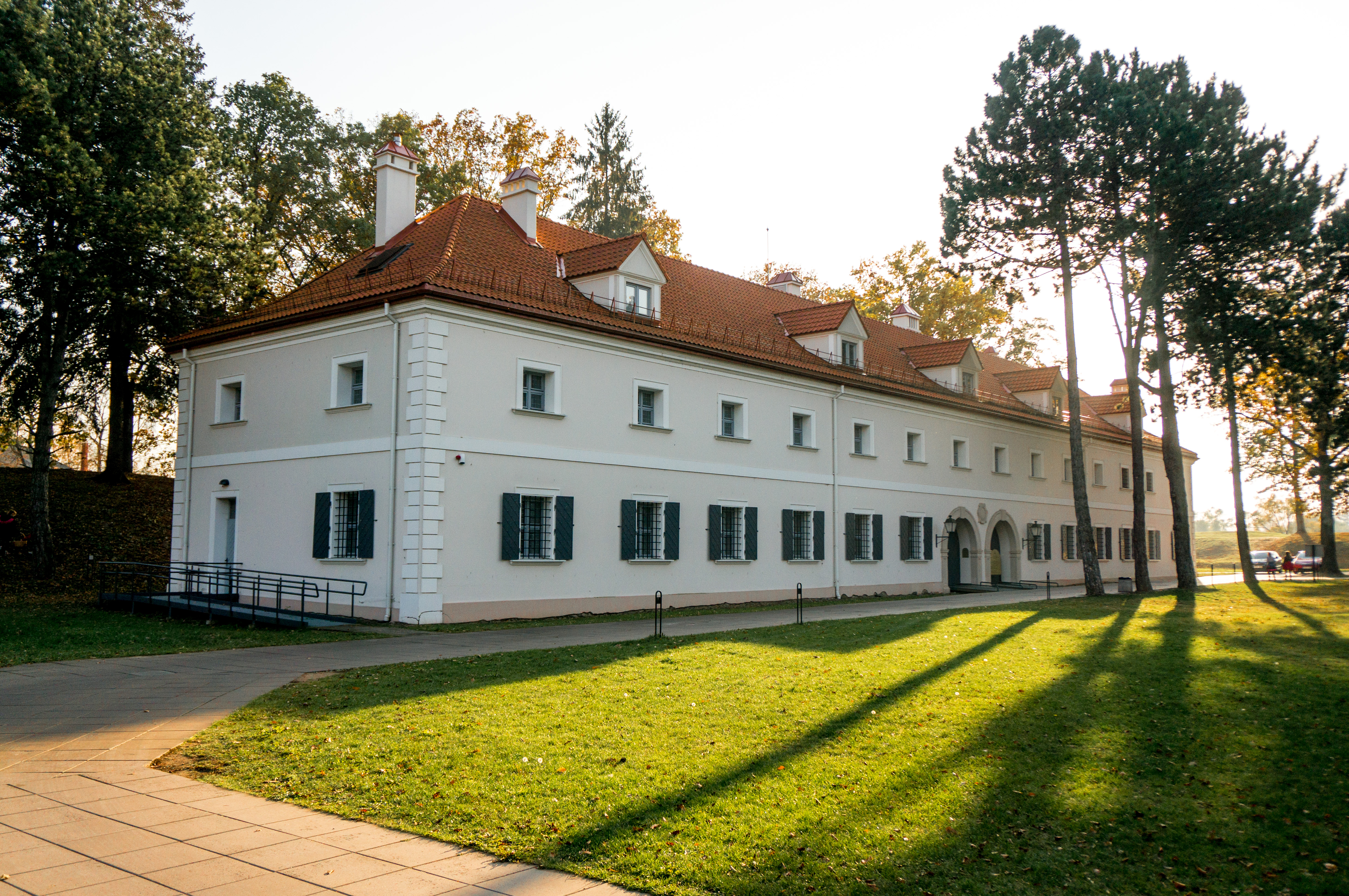
Arsenal

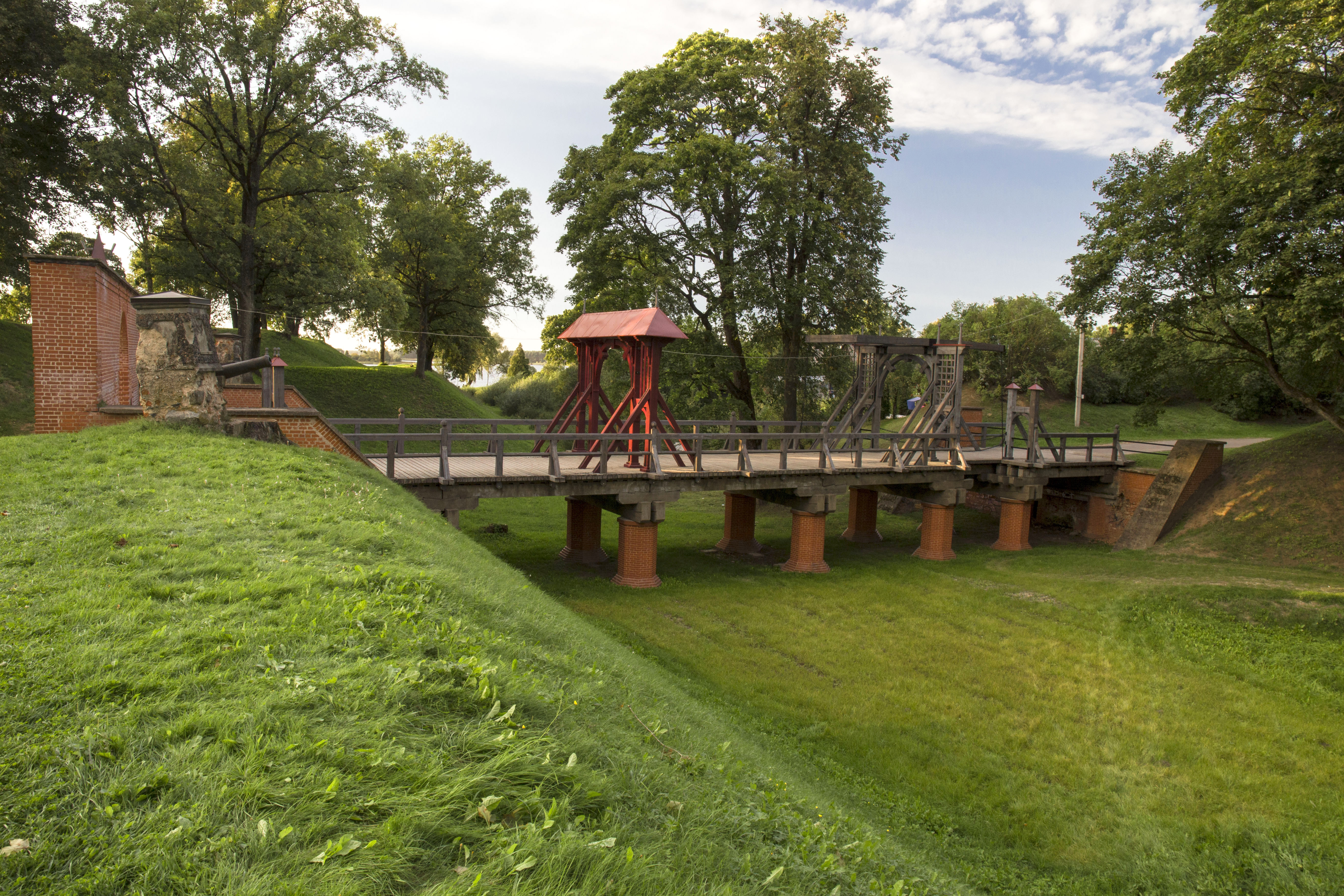
Bridge

== See also ==
- List of castles in Lithuania
