= Adam Freytag =

Polish engineer

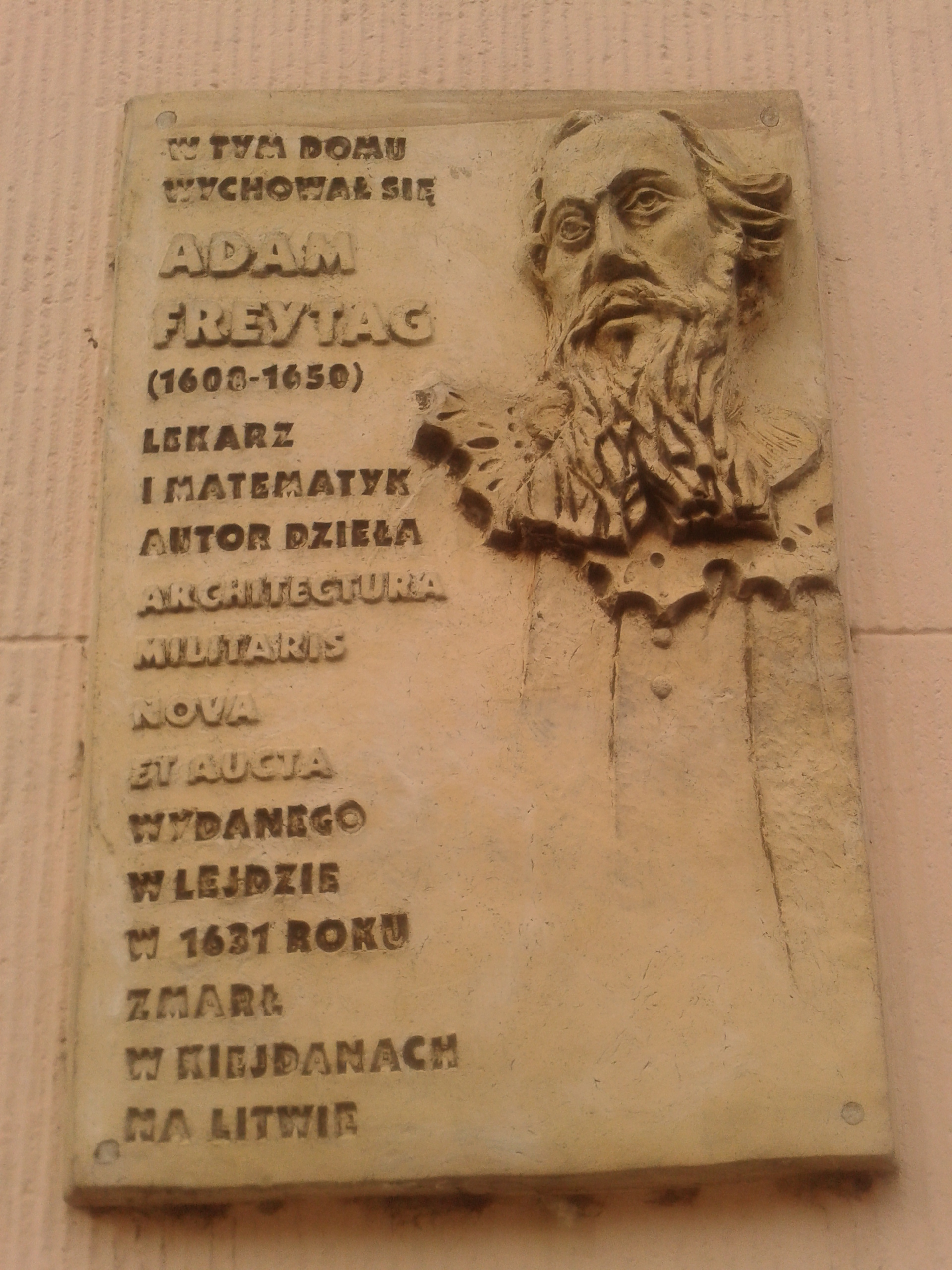
- Memorial plaque at Freytag's childhood home in Toruń
- Born: 1608; Toruń, Polish–Lithuanian Commonwealth
- Died: 1650 (aged 41–42); Kėdainiai, Polish–Lithuanian Commonwealth

Adam Freytag (1608–1650) was a Polish military engineer, mathematician and physician. He is best known for his work Architectura militaris nova et aucta, the first manual of bastion fortifications of the so-called Old Dutch system, published in 1631. In 1633–1634, he served as a Polish military engineer in the Smolensk War.

== Education ==
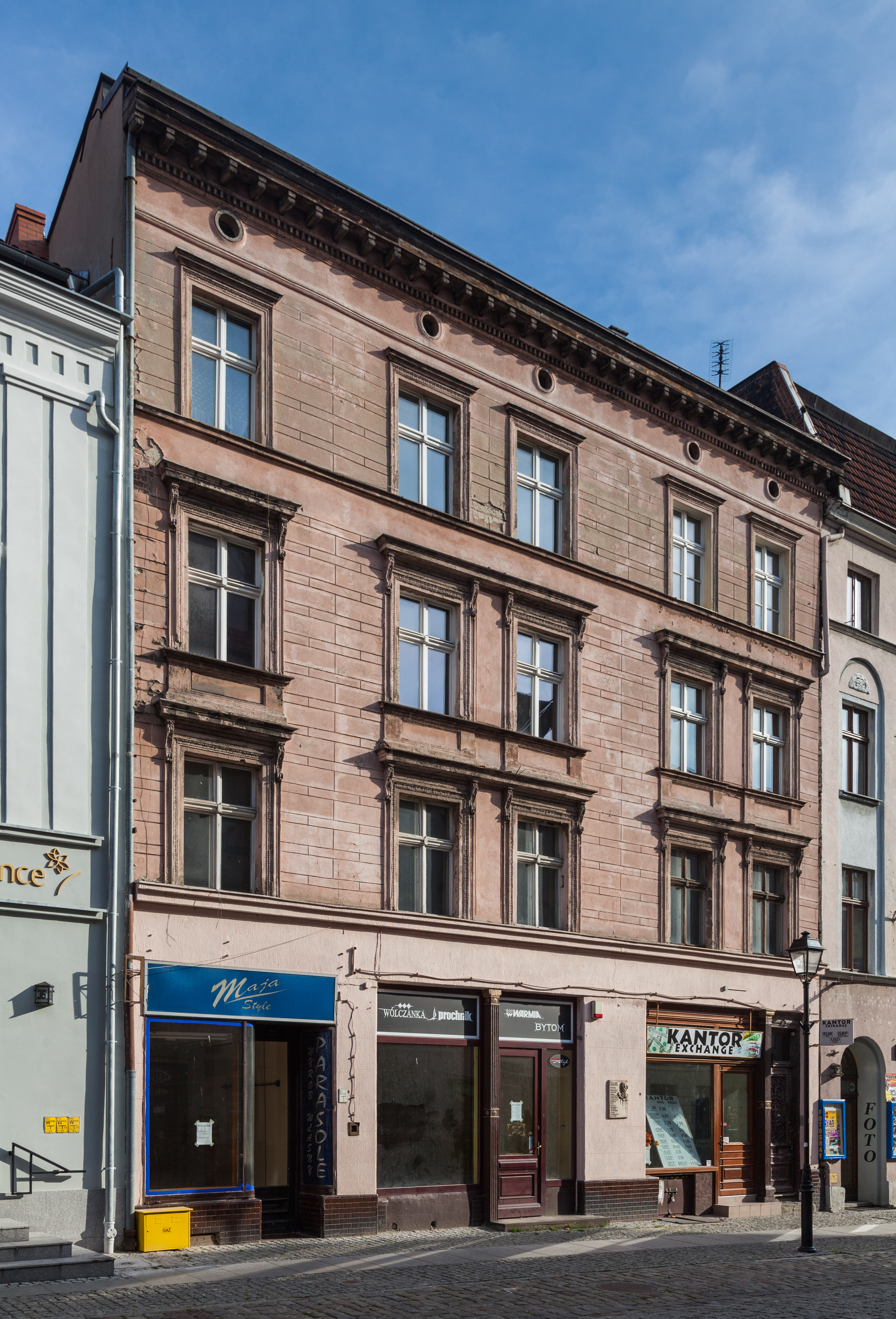
Childhood home in Toruń

He graduated gymnasium in Toruń. After receiving a scholarship from the city council, he studied at the University of Frankfurt, and then moved to the Leipzig University, where he obtained a master's degree.

== Eighty Years' War ==
He joined the military of the Dutch Republic during the Eighty Years' War under the command of Frederick Henry, Prince of Orange. He took part in the Siege of 's-Hertogenbosch in 1629. From 1629 to 1632, he studied at the medical faculty of the Leiden University, obtaining a doctorate in medicine.

During his stay in Leiden, he wrote Architectura militaris nova et aucta, the first manual of bastion fortifications of the so-called Old Dutch system, published in 1631. In 1632, he met future Grand Hetman of Lithuania Janusz Radziwiłł in Leiden.

== Return to Poland ==
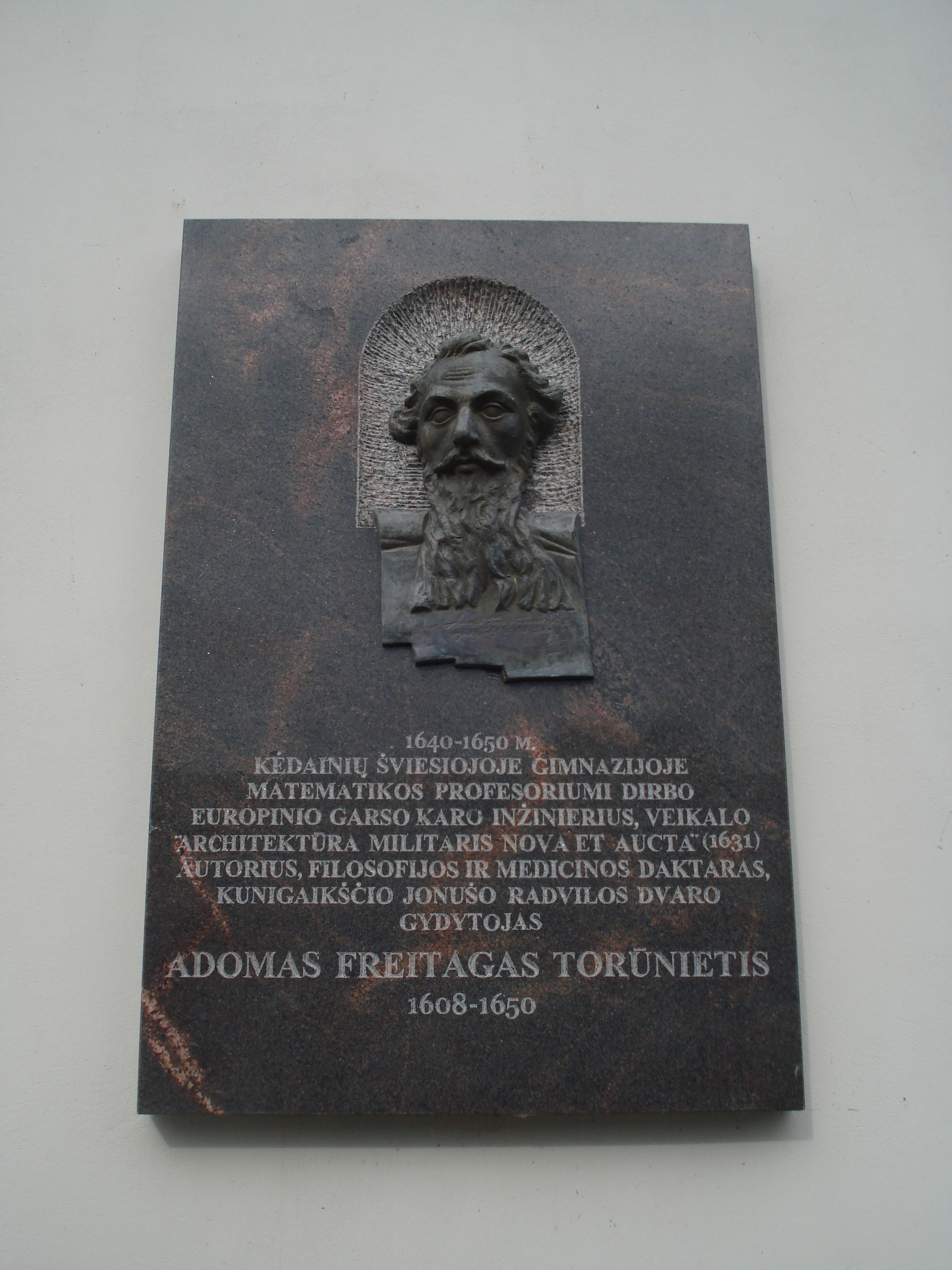
Memorial plaque in Kėdainiai

Freytag soon joined Radziwiłł's regiment and took part in the Smolensk War between Poland and Russia in 1633–1634. After the war, in 1634, he returned to Toruń and became a teacher of mathematics and astronomy at the local gymnasium. Upon request from the city authorities, he assisted in the modernization of Toruń's fortifications. Soon, however, he returned to the Radziwiłł court, and began work on modernizing the fortifications of Biržai. After 1640, he was the military engineer and court physician of Janusz Radziwiłł. Later on, he taught mathematics in the gymnasium of Kėdainiai.

== Bibliography ==
- Nagielski, Mirosław (2017). "Adam Freytag. Matematyk, architekt, inżynier i lekarz". Mówią wieki (in Polish).
