= Biržai =

City in Aukštaitija Region, Lithuania

- City
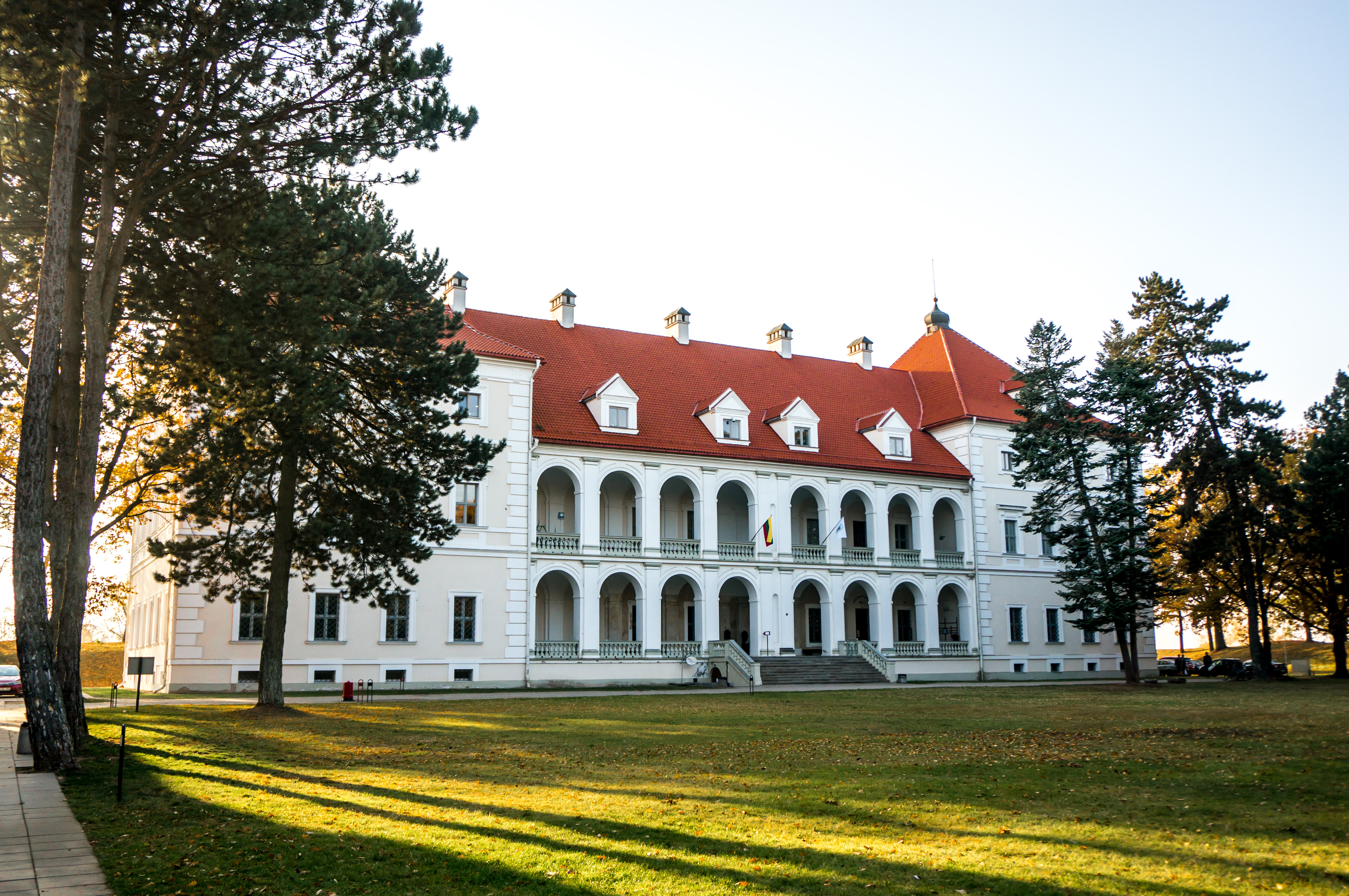
- Biržai Castle of the Radziwiłł family

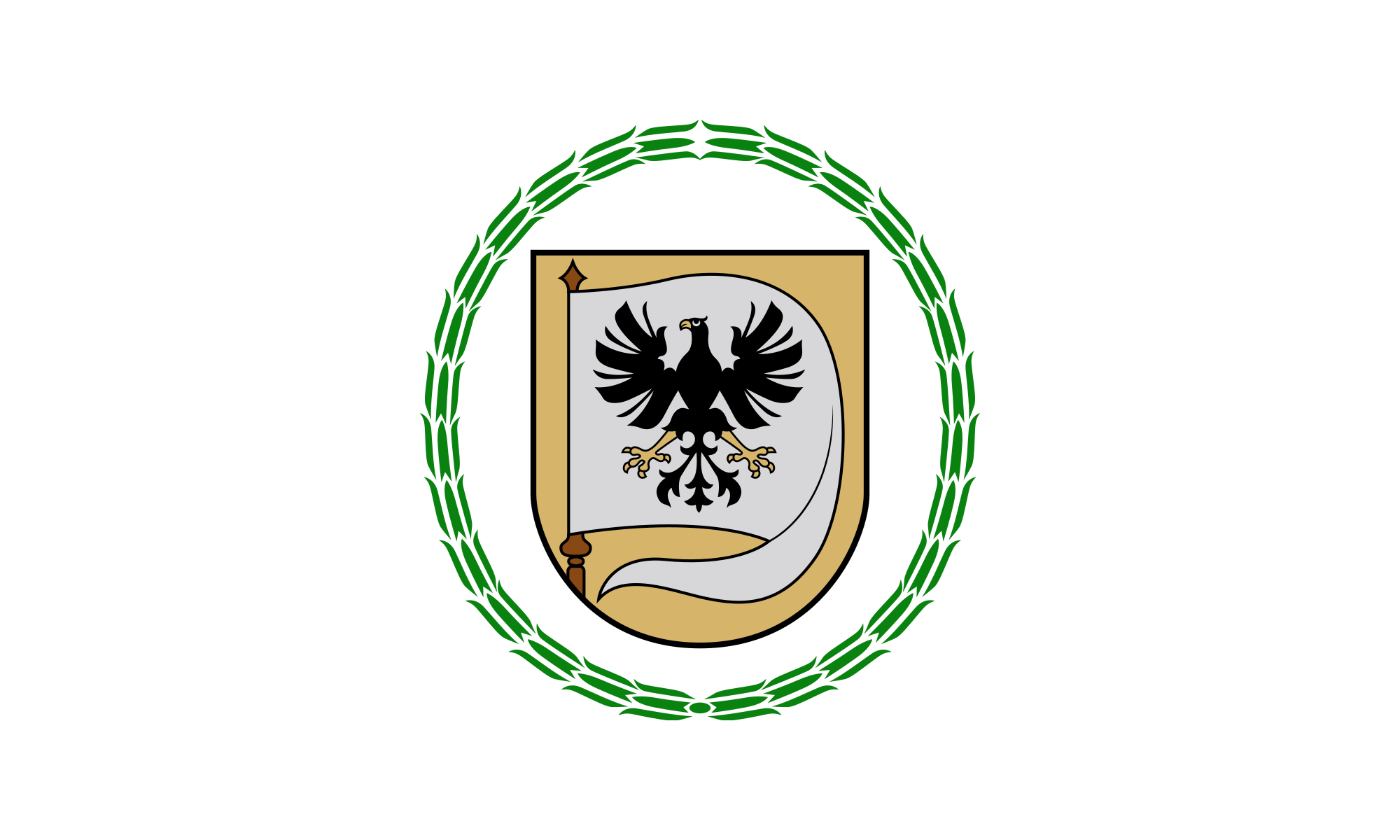
- Flag Coat of arms

- Location of Biržai
- Coordinates: 56°12′N 24°45′E
- Country: Lithuania
- Ethnographic region: Aukštaitija
- County: Panevėžys County
- Municipality: Biržai district municipality
- Eldership: Biržai city eldership
- Capital of: Biržai district municipality Biržai city eldership Širvėna eldership
- First mentioned: 1455
- Granted Town rights: 1589

Population (2020)
  - Total: 10,146
- Time zone: UTC+2 (EET)
  - Summer (DST): UTC+3 (EEST)
- Website: birzai.lt

Biržai (also known by several alternative names) is a city in northern Lithuania. Famous for its reconstructed Biržai Castle manor, the whole region is renowned for its many traditional-recipe beer breweries.

== Name ==
The exact origin of the city name is not known, but it is derived from the Lithuanian word beržas (which means birch). The name of the city in other languages includes German: Birsen; Polish: Birże, Russian: Биржай (and pre-1917 Биржи); Yiddish: בירז, romanized: Birzh.

== History ==
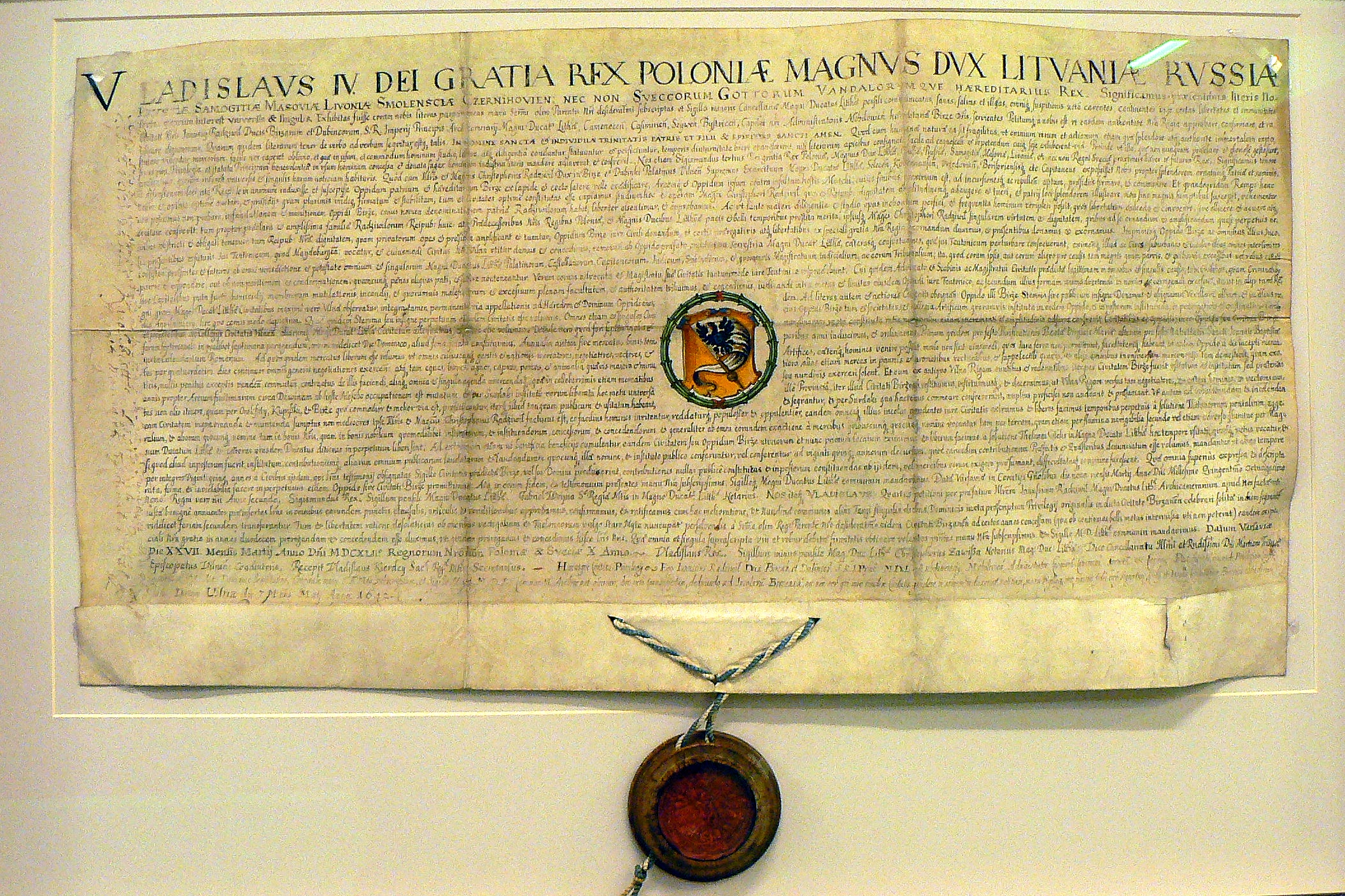
Privilege granted to Biržai by Władysław IV Vasa

The city's first written mention dates to 1455. The construction of Biržai Castle began in 1586, and the town was granted Magdeburg Rights in 1589. In 1575, as preparation for the castle's construction, a dam was built at the confluence of the Agluona and Apaščia Rivers, and the artificial Lake Širvėna, covering about 40 km^{2} (15 mi^{2}), was created. It is the oldest surviving artificial lake in Lithuania.

The town's history is closely associated with the Radziwiłł family (Lithuanian: Radvila). Jerzy Radziwiłł was the first noble to settle in the city. Later, after his daughter, Barbara Radziwiłł married the Grand Duke of Lithuania and King of Poland Sigismund II Augustus in 1547, the power and influence of the family grew immensely. The Radvila family established a Protestant church and school, and the town became a cultural center of the Protestant Reformation in Lithuania.

The local community of Lithuanian Jews, which settled in the Duchy of Biržai at the end of the 16th century, was influential, establishing an interest-free loan society, two major flour mills, and an international linen export business. The Islamic Lipka Tatars performed military, police, and postal duties for the Radziwill family.

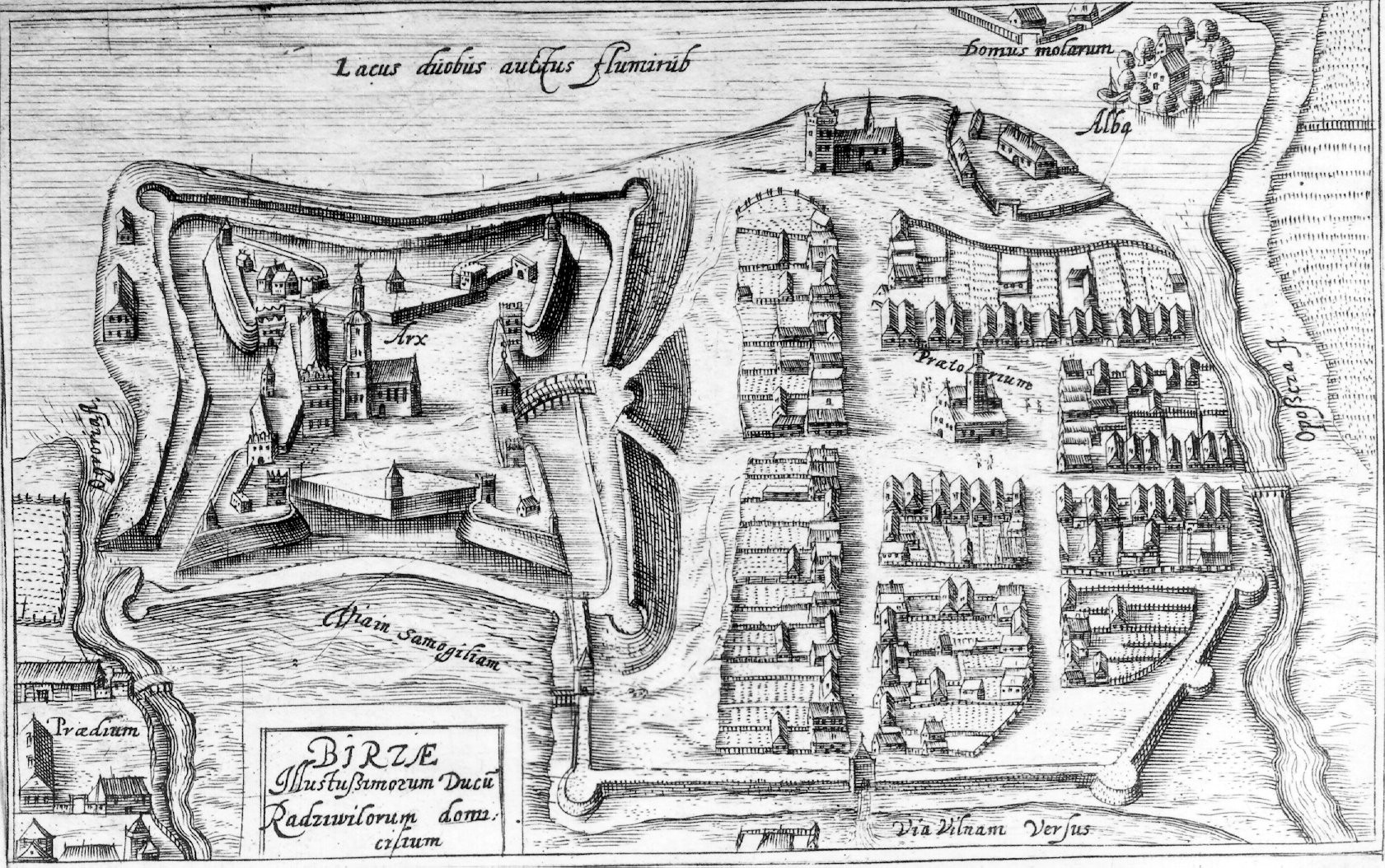
Engraving of Biržai Castle and city in 17th century

During the Wars with Sweden, Biržai Castle was an important point of defense. In 1625, Gustavus Adolphus, king of Sweden, attacked the castle with 8,000 soldiers and it was forced to surrender. The castle was left in ruins and was rebuilt, only to be burnt in 1655. In 1662–1669, it was rebuilt again in the Renaissance style. On 9 March 1701, August II the Strong and Peter I of Russia (Peter the Great) signed a pact in the castle to unite their forces against Sweden. However, in 1704 the castle was completely destroyed and was left in ruins until its restoration in the 1990s.

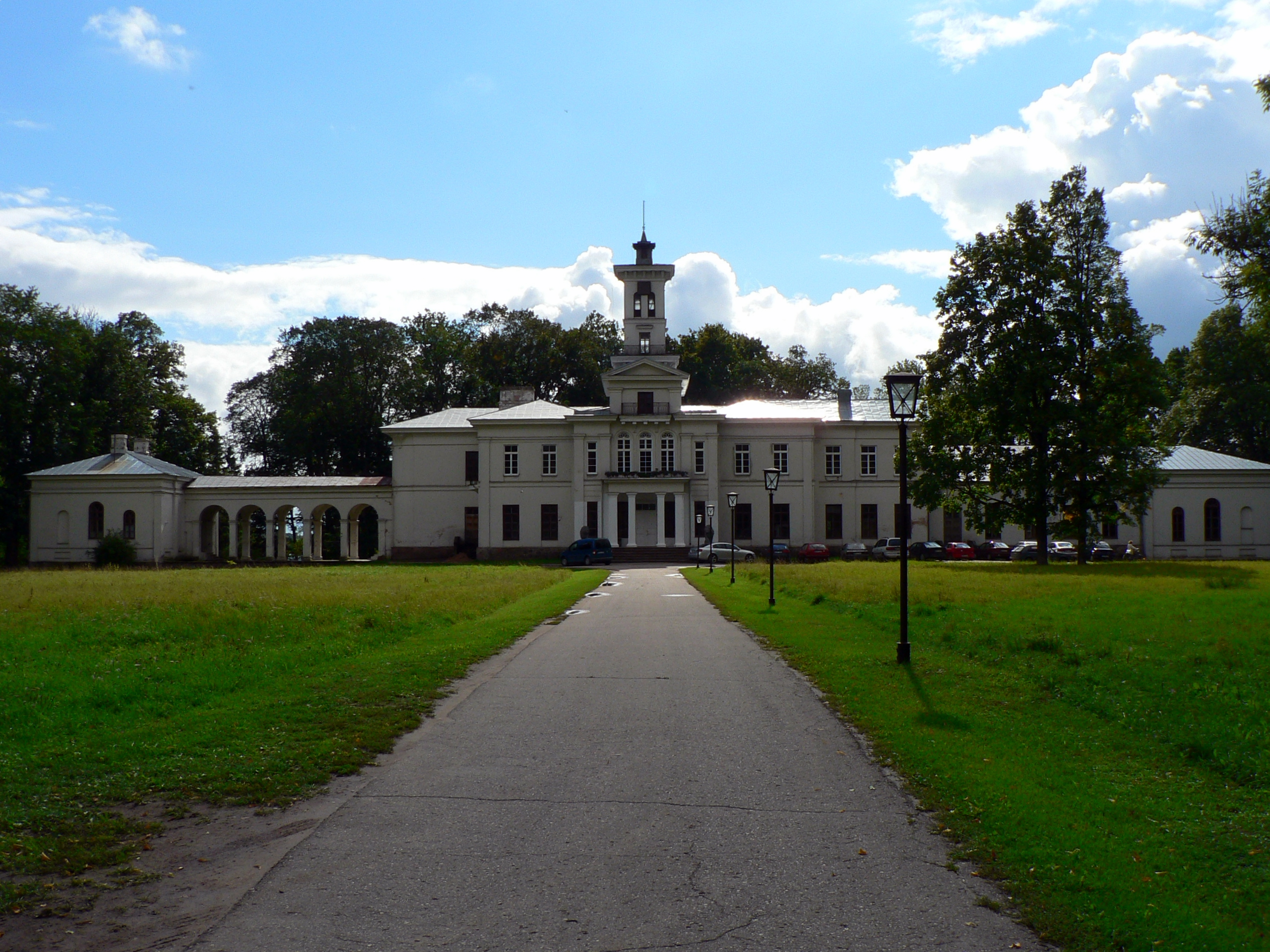
Tyszkiewicz Palace in Astravas suburb

The town's population suffered greatly due to wars and religious conflicts between the Protestants and Catholics. In the late 18th century, Biržai lost its town rights. The Radziwiłłs lost their wealth and influence, and Biržai was sold to the Tyszkiewicz family to cover debts in 1811. In 1849–1862, the Tyszkiewicz family built the neoclassic Astravas Manor palace across the lake from the site of the original castle.

In 1869 the town had about 2,600 residents. Thirty years later the population had grown to 4,400.

During World War II, the entire Jewish population of Biržai was annihilated. 15 Jews were shot to death by German soldiers at the Biržai Jewish cemetery in July 1941. On 8 August 1941, Gestapo and Lithuanian collaborators murdered the entire Jewish population of the town, some 2,400 people, by shooting them to death at a mass grave in a forest grove 3 kilometres (1.9 miles) outside the town. The town was almost completely burned down during the war. Oldtown was destroyed.

In 1968 the population reached 10,000. Currently there are 10,146 people living in Biržai.

== Architecture ==
Street of Vytautas, Birzai, 1930-40s Photographer Petras Loceris (1892–1973)

After the unrest and conflicts settled down, 19th-century wooden residential house building styles prevailed. The ongoing industrial revolution at the time meant that asbestos or metal-sheet roofing was common. With the majority of buildings being wooden, masonry buildings eventually emerged to battle cold winters and hot summers. In the early 20th century, central roads were cobblestone. During the World Wars, the old town was destroyed and the majority of wooden buildings in the main street burned down.

During the Soviet rule, the town's population grew to twice its previous size. To accommodate the growth, around 60 new apartment buildings were constructed and main streets asphalted. There was also an increase in new houses being built from bricks instead of wood, and the majority of them were left unplastered.

Work in progress and finished renovations in 2018

With the help of the European Union's Development Assistance grants, the town was able to regain a unique style: Since 2014, numerous apartment building renovations were carried out with more planned. The road infrastructure is also being improved and some new construction, built to attract visitors and to restore the historic appearance, is in progress.

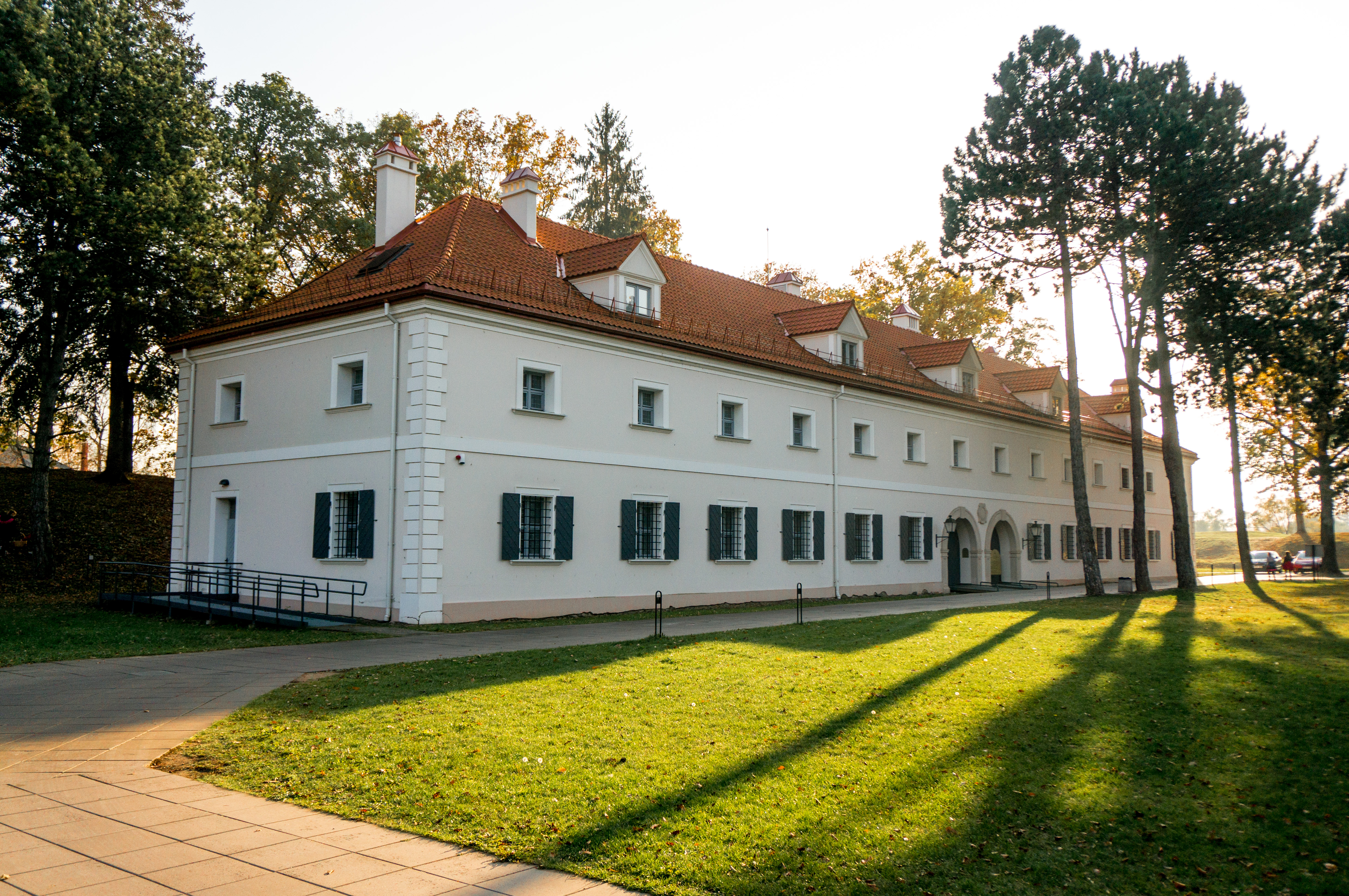
Biržai Castle Arsenal reconstructed in 2013 to restore a historic look of the Castle's yard

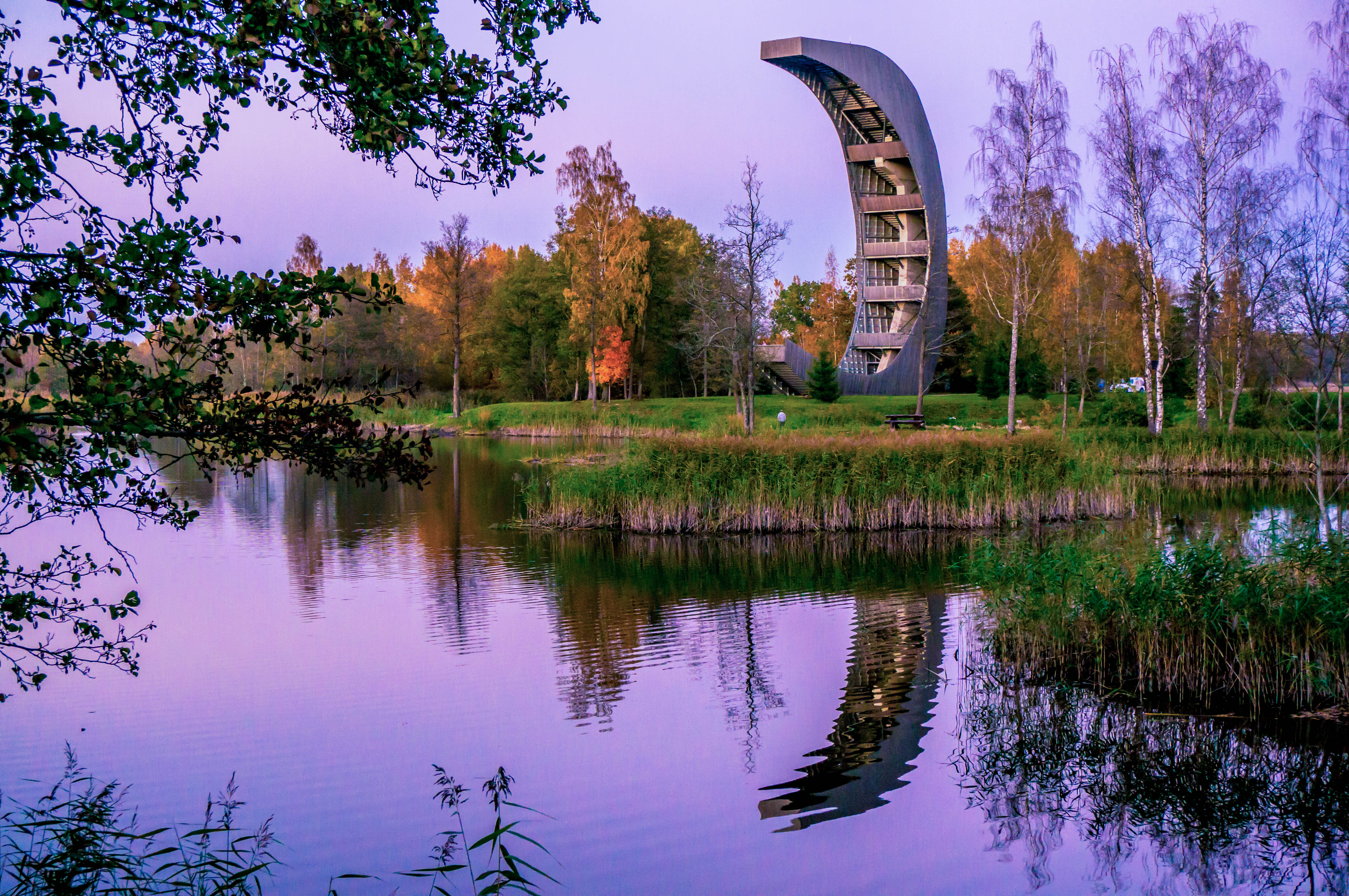
32 meters tall canoe-shaped Kirkilai Tower with a viewpoint to Kirkilai Lakes opened in 2015. The architects of the observation tower are Giedrius Akelis, Lina Šantaraitė

== Geography ==
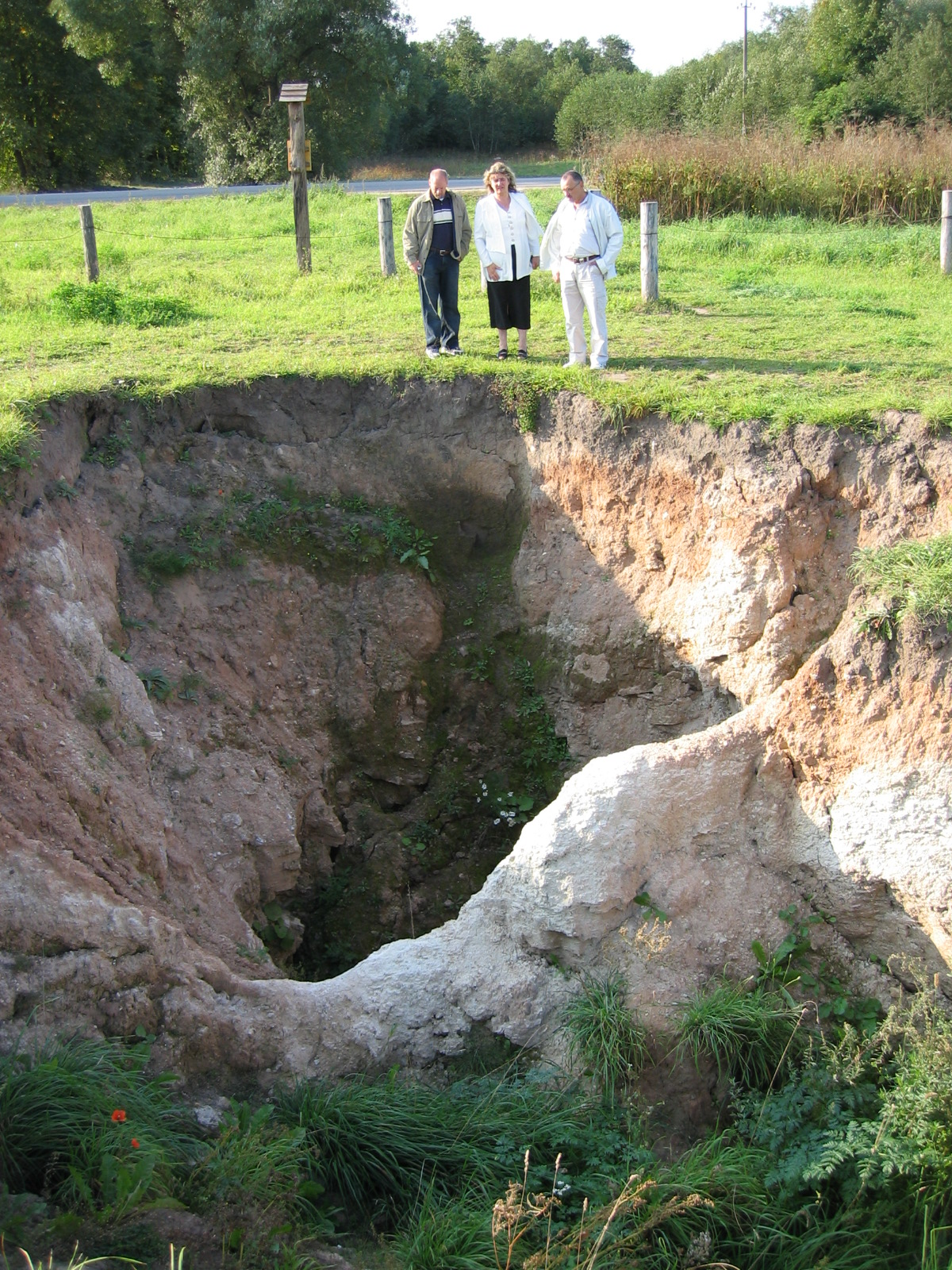
Sinkhole formed in December, 2004

The northern part of the town, along with Lake Širvėna, lies within Biržai Regional Park. About 9,000 sinkholes have been identified in the park, formed abruptly after gypsum in the soil has been dissolved by underground water. Some of these holes are dry, while others have become small ponds or lakes filled with water from the many underground rivers and streams. New holes appear annually. According to local legend, the 20-meter-deep sinkhole known as Karvės ola (Cow's Cave) was discovered by a farmer after his cow disappeared. A tunnel at its bottom leads to a cave and underground lake.

=== Climate ===
Climate data for Biržai (1991–2020 normals, extremes present)
Month	Jan	Feb	Mar	Apr	May	Jun	Jul	Aug	Sep	Oct	Nov	Dec	Year
Record high °C (°F)	8.4 (47.1)	13.0 (55.4)	18.8 (65.8)	27.8 (82.0)	30.7 (87.3)	33.3 (91.9)	33.7 (92.7)	33.3 (91.9)	28.9 (84.0)	22.7 (72.9)	16.2 (61.2)	10.5 (50.9)	33.7 (92.7)
Mean daily maximum °C (°F)	−1.1 (30.0)	−0.5 (31.1)	4.3 (39.7)	12.3 (54.1)	18.3 (64.9)	21.5 (70.7)	23.9 (75.0)	23.0 (73.4)	17.4 (63.3)	10.3 (50.5)	4.2 (39.6)	0.4 (32.7)	11.2 (52.2)
Daily mean °C (°F)	−3.3 (26.1)	−3.2 (26.2)	−0.5 (31.1)	7.1 (44.8)	12.6 (54.7)	16.1 (61.0)	18.4 (65.1)	17.4 (63.3)	12.5 (54.5)	6.7 (44.1)	2.2 (36.0)	−1.5 (29.3)	7.1 (44.8)
Mean daily minimum °C (°F)	−5.8 (21.6)	−6.0 (21.2)	−2.9 (26.8)	2.3 (36.1)	6.9 (44.4)	10.8 (51.4)	13.2 (55.8)	12.4 (54.3)	8.4 (47.1)	3.8 (38.8)	0.2 (32.4)	−3.6 (25.5)	3.3 (37.9)
Record low °C (°F)	−35.1 (−31.2)	−35.5 (−31.9)	−29.5 (−21.1)	−16.7 (1.9)	−4.1 (24.6)	0.1 (32.2)	3.5 (38.3)	0.4 (32.7)	−5.3 (22.5)	−10.8 (12.6)	−20.4 (−4.7)	−31.4 (−24.5)	−35.5 (−31.9)
Average precipitation mm (inches)	47 (1.9)	42 (1.7)	38 (1.5)	37 (1.5)	52 (2.0)	75 (3.0)	82 (3.2)	64 (2.5)	51 (2.0)	65 (2.6)	54 (2.1)	51 (2.0)	658 (26)
Average relative humidity (%)	88	86	79	70	68	72	75	76	82	86	90	90	80
Source 1: Lithuanian Hydrometeorological Service
Source 2: NOAA (extremes 1961-1990)

== Notable people ==
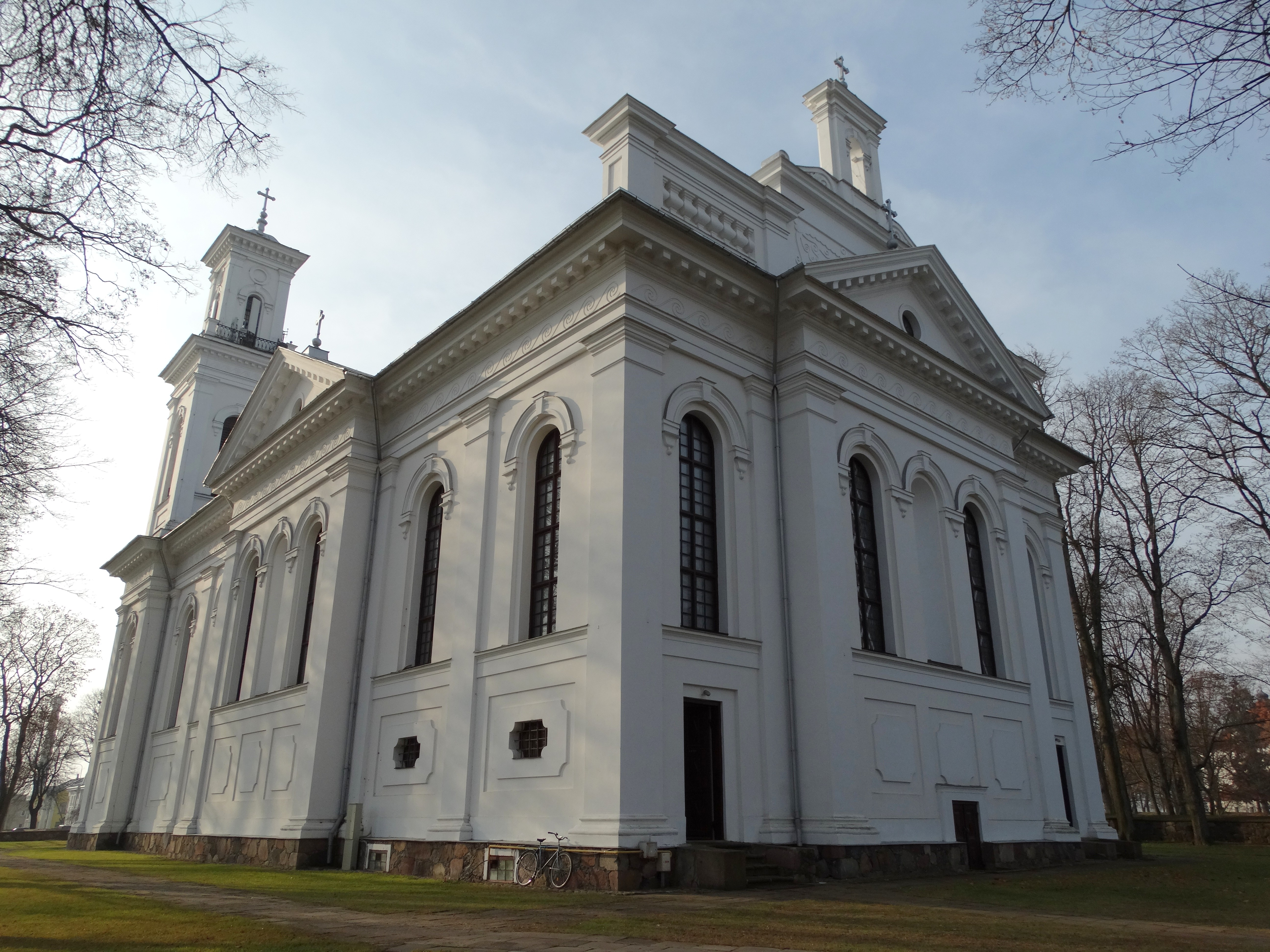
Saint John the Baptist church

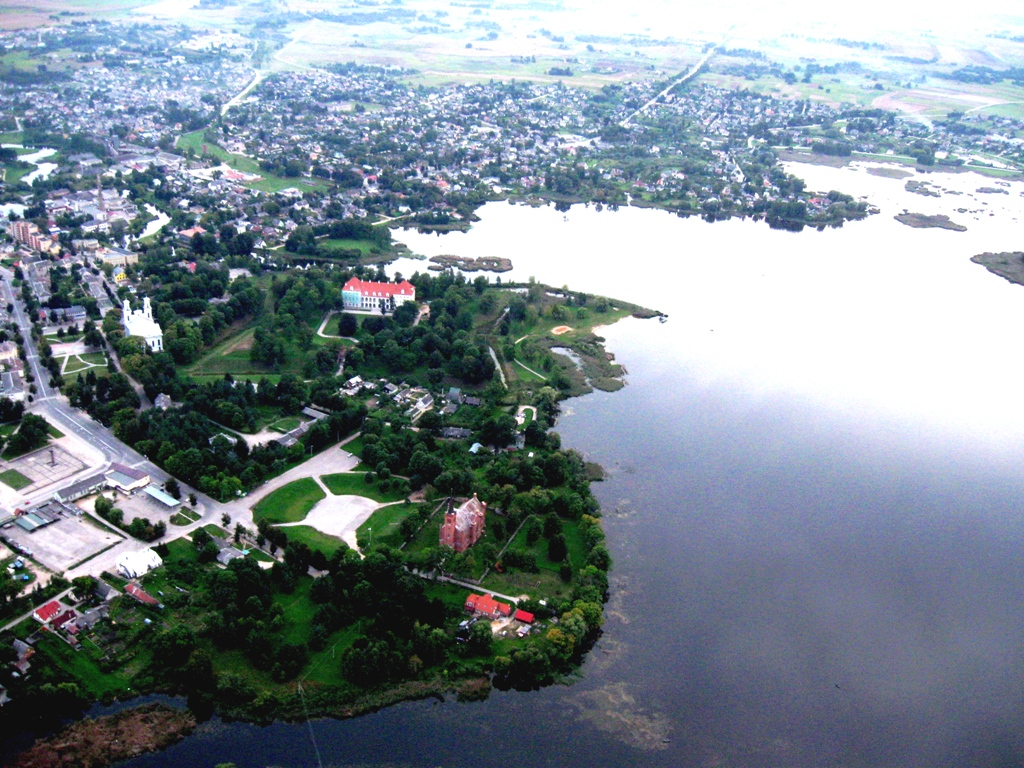
Biržai panorama

- Rimantas Bagdonas, wrestler, world champion (1965)
- Jurgis Bielinis, publicist and one of the main organizers of illegal book-smuggling (knygnešiai) at the time of the Lithuanian press ban
- Kazys Binkis, poet, playwright
- Romualdas Brazauskas, basketball referee
- Bernardas Brazdžionis, poet
- Vladas Garastas, basketball coach
- Pinchas HaKohen Lintup (1851–1924), rabbi of Hasidic community
- Vidmantas Jažauskas, Lithuanian painter
- Petras Kalpokas, painter
- Mantas Kvedaravičius, film maker and anthropologist
- Vytautas Laisonas, Lithuanian national painter
- Rolandas Makrickas, Cardinal and arch-priest of Santa Maria Maggiore
- Jonas Mekas, film maker
- Alfonsas Petrulis, signatory of the Act of Independence of Lithuania
- Jerzy Radziwiłł, Great Hetman of Lithuania
- Žydrūnas Savickas, strongman
- Austra Skujytė, olympic silver medal winner
- Janusz Skumin Tyszkiewicz
- Balys Sruoga, poet, playwright, critic, and literary theorist
- Elchonon Wasserman, Lithuanian rabbi, disciple of Chofetz Chaim
- Deimantė Žilinskienė, Vice-Rector of Kazimieras Simonavičius University in Vilnius

== Sport ==
- FK Širvėna Biržai (football club);
- Biržai Stadium (The current capacity of the stadium is 1,000 seats.);
- KK Biržai (basketball club).
