= Širvėna Lake =

Lake Širvėna
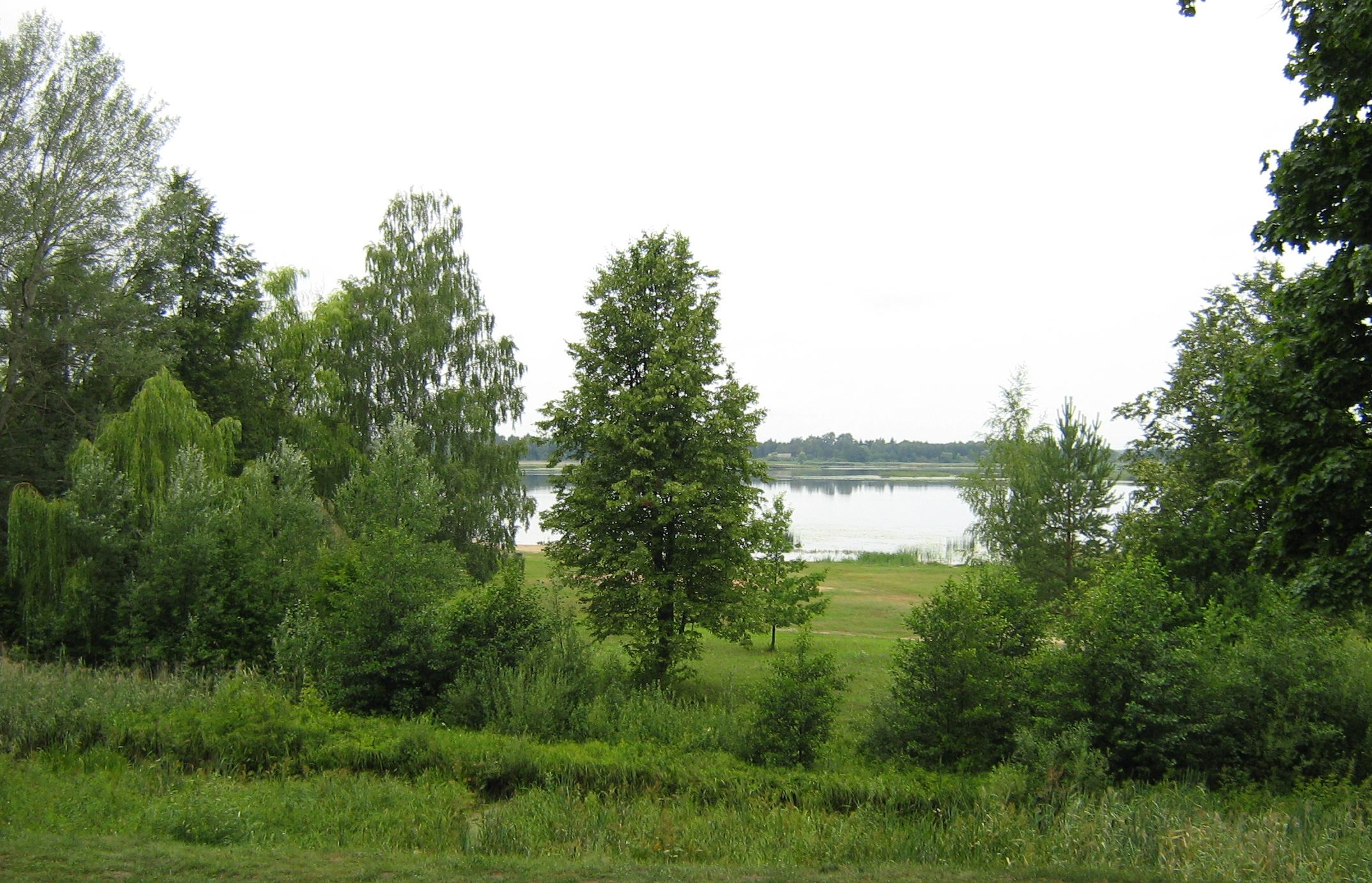
- Širvena lake as seen forn Northwestern corner of Biržai Castle

- Location within Lithuania
- Location: Biržai
- Coordinates: 56°12′43″N 24°45′18″E
- Type: reservoir
- Primary inflows: Agluona, Apaščia
- Basin countries: Lithuania
- Settlements: Biržai, Astravas, Rinkuškiai

Širvėna Lake is a lake located in Biržai municipality, northern Lithuania. It is the oldest artificial lake in Lithuania. It was created in 1575 when the dam was built on rivers Agluona and Apaščia. The lake was built to protect the Radvila castle in Biržai. Now the city of Biržai, which was built around the castle, is located on the southern shore of Širvėna lake. The suburb of Astravas is built on the northern and the suburb of Rinkuškiai on the western shore.

== Other names ==
- Biržų ežeras (The Lake of Biržai);
- Rališkių ežeras (Lake Rališkiai, before World War II);
- Prūdas (from Slavic word pond)

== Gallery ==
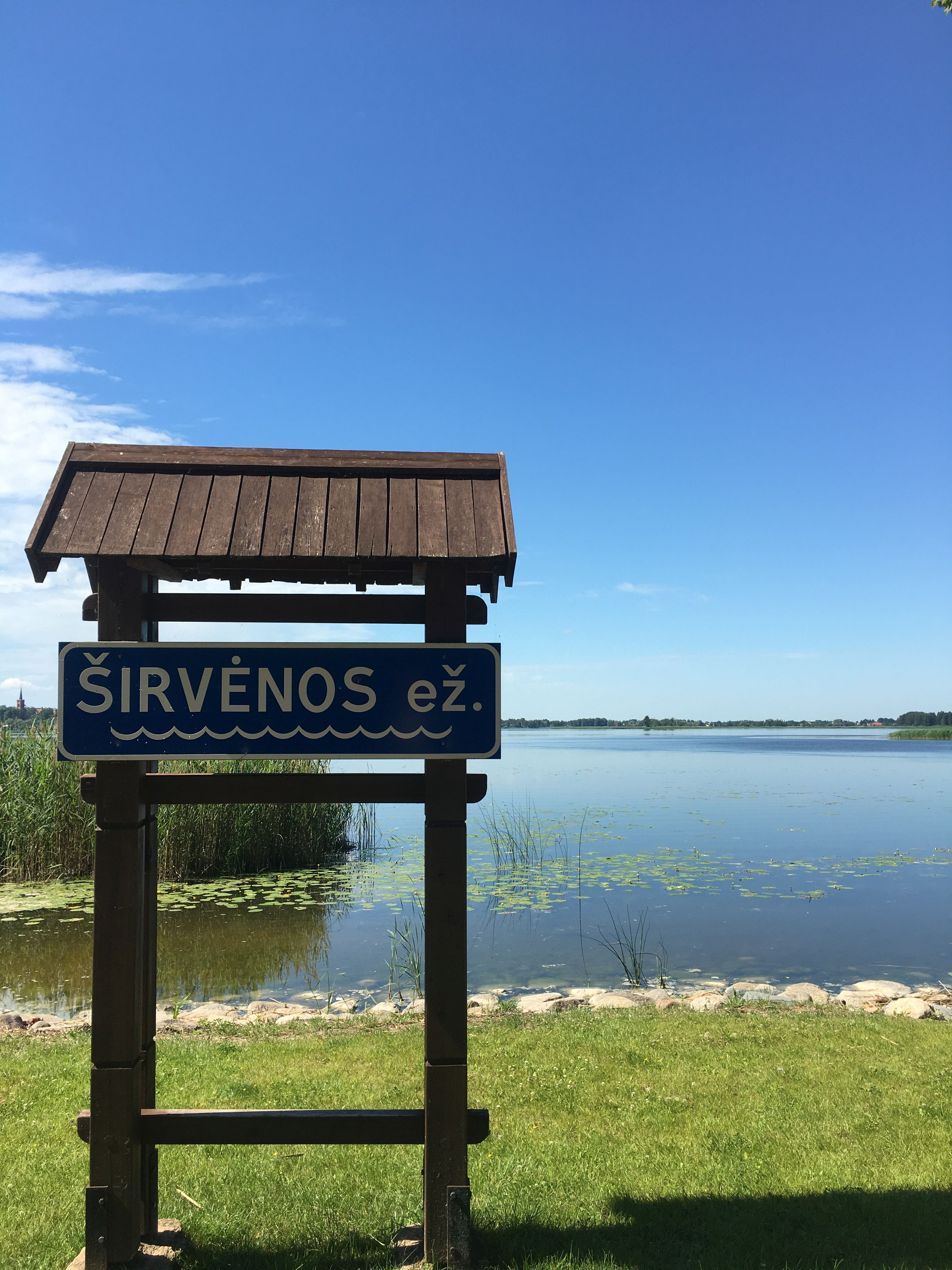
Širvėna lake with its name sign

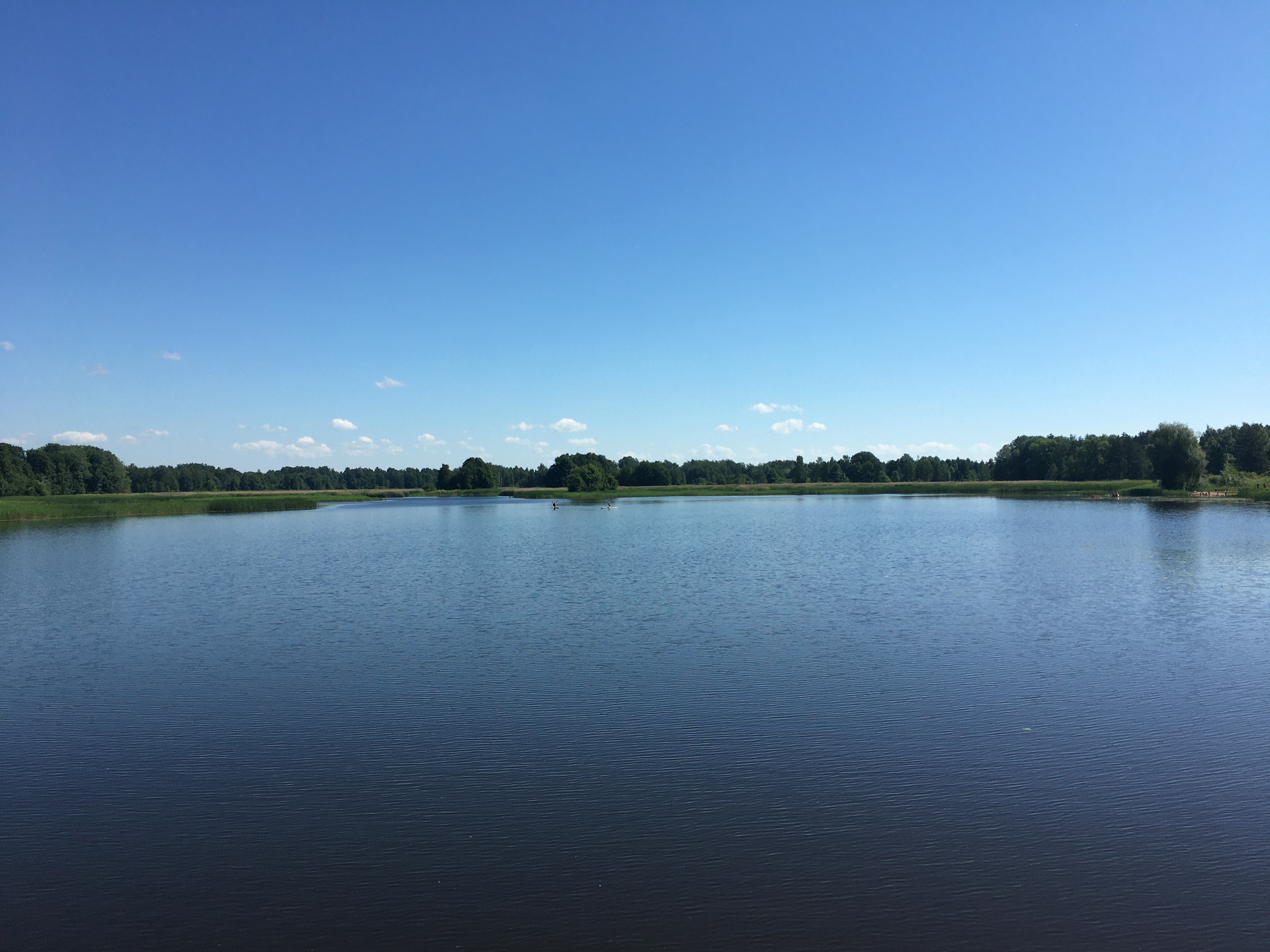
Širvėna lake view from the footbridge

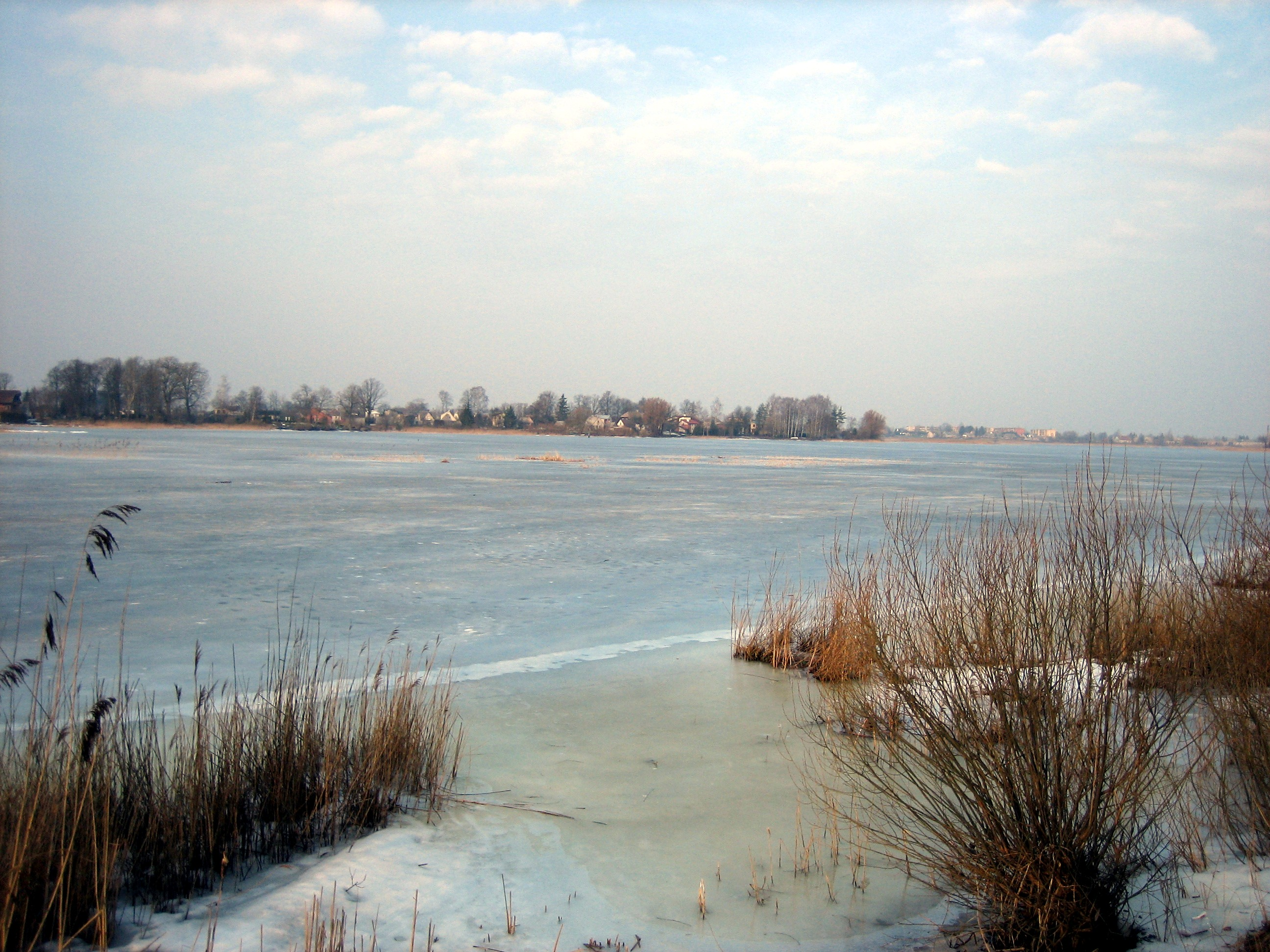
Širvėna lake during winter

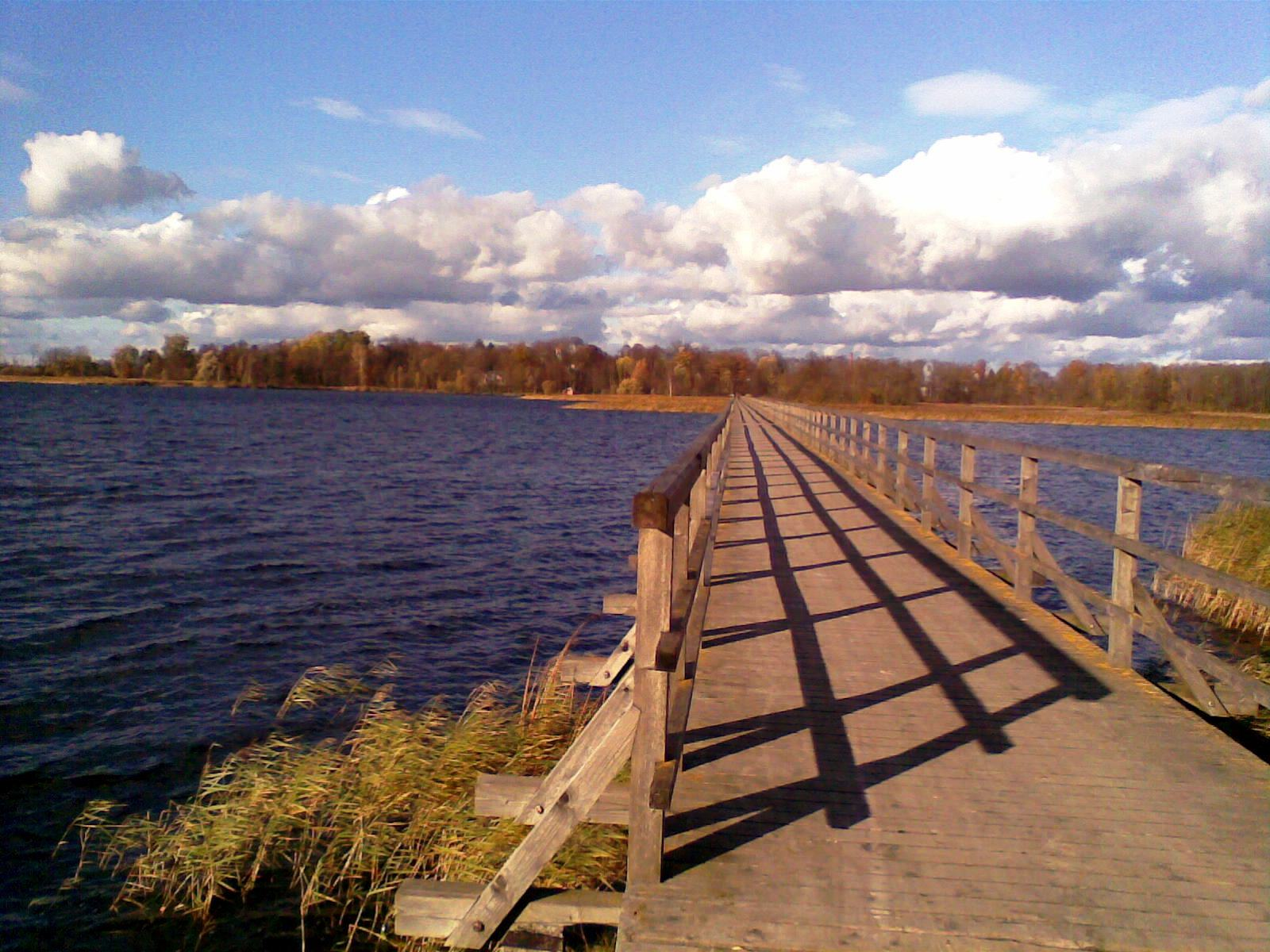
Širvėna lake footbridge
