= Rimantas Bagdonas =

Lithuanian amateur wrestler

Rimantas Bagdonas Римантас Казимирович Багдонас; born November 25, 1938, in Biržai) is a Lithuanian wrestler (Greco-Roman wrestling).

He is the only Lithuanian wrestler who became a world champion (1965). He was also the only one Lithuanian who was a champion of the Soviet Union, twice (1961, 1963), and several times champion of the Lithuanian SSR.

== Biography ==
In 1941 his mother was accused of anti-Soviet activities and exiled to Siberia, where she spent 23 years. But when Rimantas became 15 years old he decided to run away and returned to Lithuania after 11 years of exile. Since because of his age he didn't need passport, his history was unknown to the authorities. He settled with his relatives in Raseiniai district. His father emigrated to the United States after the war and mother joined him after returning from the exile.

Bagdonas started his studies at the Kiev Institute of Physical Education, but decided to continue his education in Lithuania. He was accepted at the second year of the Department of Journalism of the Vilnius State University.

After he became World Champion in 1965, it had eventually become known to the authorities of his relatives abroad, he was banned from leaving the Soviet Union for 10 years, so he could not go to the world championship next year. He left active sports in 1971.

== Awards and reconginition ==
- Since 2000, R. Bagdonas's international Greco-Roman wrestling tournaments have been held in Vilnius annually.
- The Olympic Star of the Lithuanian National Olympic Committee (2003)
- Officer's Cross of the Order for Merits to Lithuania (2004)
- Kūno kultūros ir sporto departamento Sporto garbės komandoro ženklas (2008)
- Charta Solemnis award of the Lithuanian National Olympic Committee (2008)
