= List of palaces and manor houses in Lithuania =

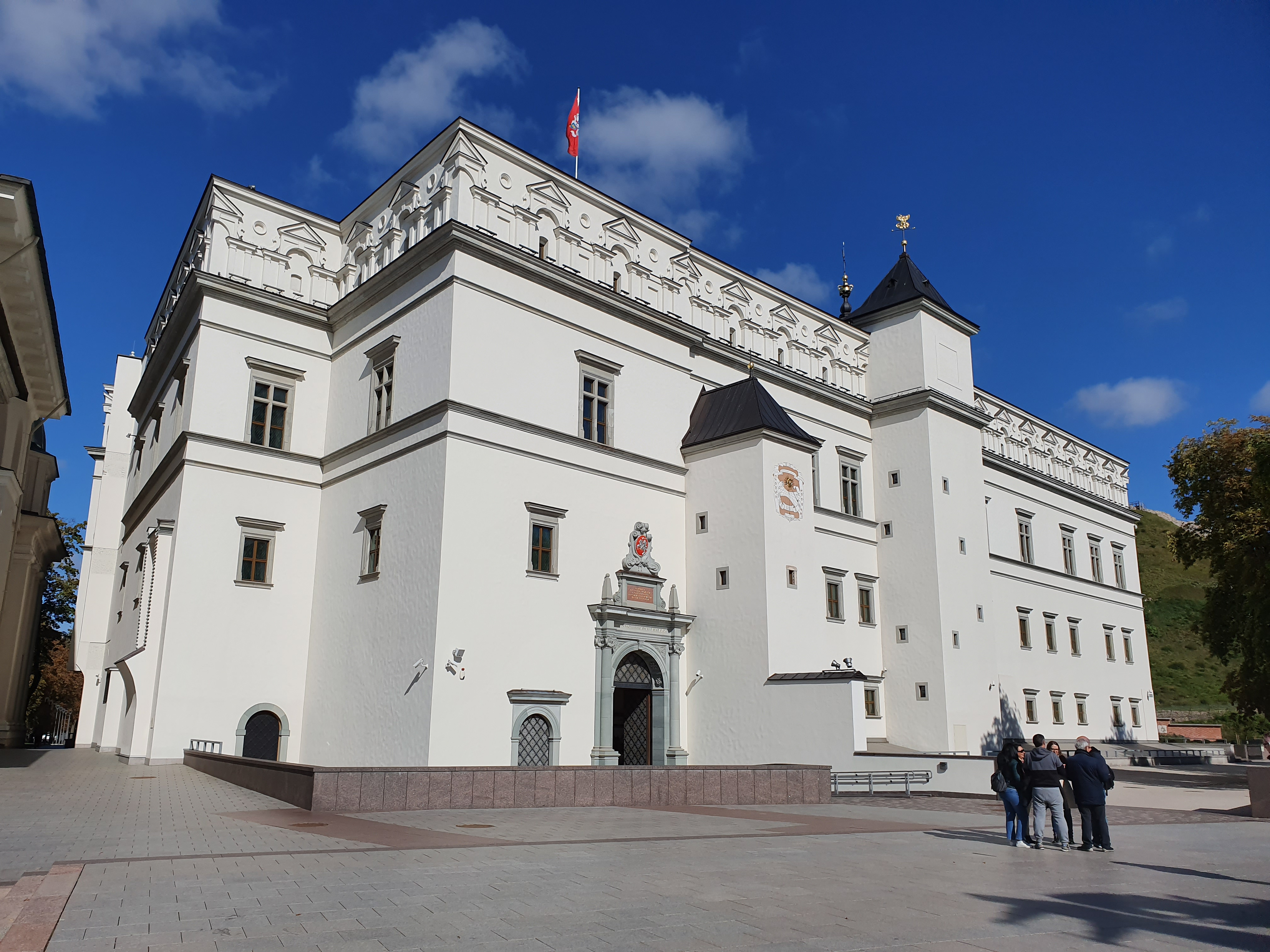
Palace of the Grand Dukes of Lithuania, Vilnius.

This is the List of palaces and manor houses in Lithuania. This list does not include castles, which are listed in a separate article. As there are about 4000 historical manor homesteads in the territory of Lithuania, and currently about 800 manors, this list is incomplete.

== Akmenė District Municipality ==
- Dabikinė Manor
- Kairiškiai Manor
- Keidai Manor
- Klaišiai Manor
- Kruopiai Manor
- Medemrodė Manor
- Paragiai Manor

== Alytus District Municipality ==
- Alovė Manor
- Dapkiškiai Manor
- Obelija Manor
- Pasimniai Manor
- Rodžia Manor

== Anykščiai District Municipality ==
- Akmena Manor
- Aknystos Manor
- Antalina Manor
- Anykščiai Manor
- Burbiškis Manor
- Jakšiškis Manor
- Janapolis Manor
- Jokūbava Manor
- Kavarskas Manor
- Kurkliai II Manor
- Laviškis Manor
- Pavirinčiai Manor
- Pelyšai I Manor
- Petkūnai Manor
- Pienionai Manor
- Raguvėlė Manor
- Savičiūnai Manor
- Sedeikiai Manor
- Šlavėnai Manor
- Svėdasai Manor
- Svirniai I Manor
- Troškūnai Manor (Smėlynė Manor),
- Vašuokėnai Manor

== Birštonas Municipality ==
- Jundeliškiai Manor
- Siponys Manor

== Biržai District Municipality ==
- Astravas Manor
- Butautai Manor
- Daudžgiriai Manor
- Didžioji Panemunė Manor
- Kraštai Manor
- Mantagailiškis Manor
- Pabiržė Manor (Balandiškiai Manor
- Panemunė Manor
- Papilys Manor
- Parovėja Manor
- Ringaudos Manor
- Skrebiškis Manor
- Velykionys Manor
- Zomkelis Manor

== Druskininkai Municipality ==
- Leipalingis Manor
- Panemunė Manor

== Elektrėnai Municipality ==
- Abromiškės Manor
- Ausieniškiai Manor
- Daugirdiškiai Manor
- Paneriai Manor
- Semeliškės Manor
- Vievis Manor

== Ignalina District Municipality ==
- Antaprūdė Manor
- Dūkštas Manor
- Griškiškė Manor
- Kazitiškis Manor
- Kazokinė Manor
- Krikonys Manor
- Meikštai Manor
- Pakiaunys Manor
- Paliesius Manor
- Vidiškiai Manor

== Jonava District Municipality ==
- Barborlaukis Manor
- Beržai Manor
- Bukonys Manor
- Daigučiai Manor
- Drobiškiai Manor
- Lokėnėliai Manor
- Markutiškiai Manor
- Mykoliškiai Manor
- Milagainiai Manor
- Mitėniškiai Manor
- Naujokai Manor
- Palankesiai Manor
- Skaruliai Manor
- Šilai Manor
- Vainiai Manor
- Žeimiai Manor
- Žemutinė Kulva Manor

== Joniškis District Municipality ==
- Daunorava Manor
- Jakiškiai Manor
- Jurdaičiai Manor
- Lazdyniškiai Manor
- Malgūžiai Manor
- Martyniškiai Manor
- Paaudruvė Manor
- Raudondvaris Manor
- Žagarė Manor

== Jurbarkas District Municipality ==
- Belvederis Manor
- Daugėliai Manor
- Jurbarkas Manor
- Lapgiriai Manor
- Padubysys Manor
- Panemunė Manor
- Raudonė Manor
- Veliuona Manor

== Kaišiadorys District Municipality ==
- Kaišiadorys Manor
- Kurniškiai Manor
- Mūro Strėvininkai Manor
- Stasiūnai Manor
- Tauckūnai Manor
- Triliškiai Manor
- Žasliai Manor
- Žiežmariai Manor

== Kalvarija Municipality ==
- Kalvarija Manor
- Mockava Manor
- Zigmantavas Manor

== Kaunas ==
- Old Kaunas Ducal Palace
- Siručiai Palace
- Zabieliai Palace
- Historical Presidential Palace, Kaunas
- Aukštosios Fredos dvaras, Aleksoto sen.
- Linkuva Manor
- Marva Manor
- Pažaislis Manor
- Romainys Manor
- Sargėnai Manor
- Tirkiliškiai Manor

== Kaunas District Municipality ==
- Babtynas Manor
- Bivyliai Manor
- Brūžė Manor
- Kačiūniškė Manor
- Krivėnai Manor
- Kudrėnai Manor
- Kvesos Manor
- Lapės Manor
- Noreikiškės Manor
- Padauguvėlė Manor
- Panevėžiukas Manor
- Puidinė Manor
- Raudondvaris Manor
- Šilelis Manor
- Stanislava Manor
- Viršužiglis Manor
- Vytėnai Manor
- Zacišius Manor
- Žvirgždė Manor

== Kazlų Rūda Municipality ==
- Antanavas Manor

== Kėdainiai District Municipality ==
- Akademija Manor
- Apytalaukis Manor
- Aristavas Manor
- Aukupėnai Manor
- Barkūniškis Manor
- Jasnagurka Manor
- Kalnaberžė Manor
- Kėdainiai Manor
- Lančiūnava Manor
- Lipliūnai Manor
- Naujaberžė Manor
- Paberžė Manor
- Pašumerys Manor
- Pašušvys Manor
- Pauslajas Manor
- Pavermenis Manor
- Piliamantas Manor
- Šetenai Manor
- Sirutiškis Manor
- Šlapaberžė Manor
- Stasinė Manor
- Sviliukai Manor
- Terespolis Manor
- Vaiškonys Manor
- Zavišinė Manor

== Kelmė District Municipality ==
- Beržėnai Manor
- Gelučiai Manor
- Graužikai Manor
- Kelmė Manor
- Kiaunoriai Manor
- Pagryžuvys Manor
- Pakėvys Manor
- Pavandenė Manor
- Šaukėnai Manor
- Šilo Pavėžupis Manor
- Tytuvėnėliai Manor
- Užvarmis Manor
- Užvenčys Manor
- Vaiguva Manor
- Verpena Manor

== Klaipėda ==
- Bachmanas Manor
- Gedminai Manor
- Paupys Manor
- Rumpiškė Manor
- Sendvaris Manor
- Tauralaukis Manor

== Klaipėda District Municipality ==
- Dovilai Manor
- Kalotė Manor
- Kiškėnai Manor
- Klemiškė Manor
- Kliošiai Manor
- Lankiškės Manor
- Lėbartai Manor
- Priekulė Manor
- Samališkė Manor
- Vėžaičiai Manor
- Žemgrindžiai Manor

== Kretinga District Municipality ==
- Aukštkalviai Manor
- Darbėnai Manor
- Dimitravas Manor
- Gaudučiiai Manor
- Genčiai Manor
- Jokūbavas Manor
- Kartena Manor
- Kašučiai Manor
- Kretinga Manor
- Laukžemė Manor
- Mažučiai Manor
- Mišučiai Manor
- Pesčiai Manor
- Pryšmančiai Manor
- Salantos Manor
- Šalynas Manor
- Tinteliai Manor
- Žadeikiai Manor

== Kupiškis District Municipality ==
- Adomynė Manor
- Antašava Manor
- Mirabelis Manor
- Noriūnai Manor
- Pajuodupė Manor
- Palėvenė Manor
- Salamiestis Manor
- Šetekšnai Manor
- Vaduvos Manor
- Zasinyčiai Manor

== Lazdijai District Municipality ==
- Aradninkai Manor
- Aštrioji Kirsna Manor
- Būdvietis Manor
- Bulakavas Manor
- Rudamina Manor
- Vainežeris Manor

== Marijampolė Municipality ==
- Bukta Manor
- Ivoniškis Manor
- Kvietiškis Manor
- Liūliškis Manor
- Riečius Manor
- Tautkaičius Manor
- Žydronys Manor

== Mažeikiai District Municipality ==
- Dautarai Manor
- Griežė Manor
- Kapėnai Manor
- Pavirvytė Manor
- Plinkšiai Manor
- Renavas Manor
- Ritinė Manor
- Sugaudžiai Manor
- Ukrinai Manor

== Molėtai District Municipality ==
- Alanta Manor
- Ambraziškiai Manor
- Anomislis Manor
- Arnionys Manor
- Baltadvaris Manor
- Bekupė Manor
- Bijutiškis Manor
- Čiuliai Manor
- Didžiokai Manor
- Dubingiai Manor
- Girsteikiškis Manor
- Inketrai Manor
- Klabiniai Manor
- Libertava Manor
- Martyniškės Manor
- Parudinė Manor
- Siesartis Manor
- Žalvariai Manor
- Želtiškiai Manor
- Žižmauka Manor

== Pagėgiai Municipality ==
- Būbliškė Manor
- Palumpiai Manor
- Pempynė Manor
- Šereitlaukis Manor
- Šilgaliai Manor
- Vilkyškiai Manor

== Pakruojis District Municipality ==
- Akmenėlių Manor (Pakruojis)
- Akmenėlių Manor (Žeimelis)
- Aukštadvario Manor
- Balsiai Manor
- Dovydiškis Manor
- Gedučiai Manor
- Geručiai Manor
- Impoliiai Manor
- Klovainiai Manor
- Lašmenpamūšis Manor
- Linksmučiai Manor
- Pakruojis Manor
- Pamūšys Manor (Linkuva)
- Pamūšys Manor (Pašvitinys)
- Pavėzgiai Manor
- Plonėnas Manor
- Rimkūnai Manor
- Vileišiai Manor

== Palanga ==
- Tiškevičiai Palace, Palanga
- Būtingė Manor
- Palanga Manor

== Panevėžys ==
- Skaistakalnis Manor

== Panevėžys District Municipality ==
- Alančiai Manor
- Aukštadvaris Manor
- Bygailiai Manor
- Bistrampolis Manor
- Daniliškis Manor
- Giniūnai Manor
- Jotainiai Manor
- Jutkoniai Manor
- Leonardava Manor
- Liberiškis Manor
- Linkavičiai Manor
- Liūdynė Manor
- Mitriūnai Manor
- Naudvaris Manor
- Pajuostė Manor
- Paliūniškis Manor
- Pamiškė Manor
- Puziniškis Manor
- Rodai II Manor
- Staniūnai Manor
- Ūdros Manor
- Upytė Manor
- Vadaktėliai Manor
- Vadaktai Manor

== Pasvalys District Municipality ==
- Ąžuolpamūšė Manor
- Baltpamūšis Manor
- Barklainiai Manor
- Dagilynė Manor
- Daniūnai Manor
- Daučkėnai Manor
- Didieji Grūžai Manor
- Geltonpamūšė Manor
- Gulbinėnai Manor
- Joniškėlis Manor
- Kamardė Manor
- Kaukliai Manor
- Kyburiai Manor
- Lavėnai Manor
- Moliūnai Manor
- Nairiai Manor
- Pajiešmeniai Manor
- Raudonpamūšė Manor
- Saločiai Manor
- Sokai Manor
- Škilinpamūšis Manor
- Švokštonys Manor
- Toliūnai Manor
- Žilpamūšis Manor

== Plungė District Municipality ==
- Bukantė Manor
- Gintališkė Manor
- Plateliai Manor
- Plungė Manor
- Šateikiai Manor
- Šventorkalnis Manor

== Prienai District Municipality ==
- Balbieriškis Manor
- Daukšiagirė Manor
- Jieznas Manor
- Lelioniai Manor
- Pagirmuonis Manor
- Patamulšis Manor
- Prienai Manor
- Rodomislė Manor

== Radviliškis District Municipality ==
- Amalija Manor
- Baisogala Manor
- Beinorava Manor
- Birželiai Manor
- Burbiškis Manor
- Diktariškiai Manor
- Gražioniai Manor
- Kurkliai Manor
- Maldžiūnai Manor
- Pakiršinis Manor
- Palonai Manor
- Polekėlė Manor
- Radvilonys Manor
- Ramulėnai Manor
- Raudondvario Manor
- Šaukotas Manor
- Šeduva Manor
- Šiaulėnai Manor
- Vadaktai Manor
- Viktorinė Manor
- Vileikiai Manor

== Raseiniai District Municipality ==
- Ariogala Manor
- Belazariškis Manor
- Biliūnai Manor
- Blinstrubiškiai Manor
- Burbiškiai Manor
- Gėluva Manor
- Katauskiai Manor
- Palukščiai Manor
- Plembergas Manor
- Ročiškė Manor
- Skaraitiškė Manor
- Tendžiogala Manor
- Žaiginis Manor
- Žibuliai Manor
- Žičkiškė Manor

== Rietavas Municipality ==
- Rietavas Manor

== Rokiškis District Municipality ==
- Aleksandravėlė Manor
- Antanašė Manor
- Aukštadvaris Manor
- Bagdoniškis Manor
- Čedasai Manor
- Gačioniai Manor
- Ilzenbergas Manor
- Kavoliškis Manor
- Kraštai Manor
- Obeliai Manor
- Onuškis Manor
- Pandėlis Manor
- Panemunis Manor
- Petrošiškis Manor
- Rokiškėliai Manor
- Rokiškis Manor
- Salos Manor
- Skemai Manor
- Tarnava Manor

== Skuodas District Municipality ==
- Dvaralis Manor
- Juodkaičiai Manor
- Kivyliai Manor
- Šarkė Manor
- Skuodas Manor

== Šakiai District Municipality ==
- Branduoliškiai Manor
- Daukantiškiai Manor
- Gelgaudiškiai Manor
- Ilguva Manor
- Kiduliai Manor
- Kriūkai Manor
- Pavilkija Manor
- Žemoji Panemunė Manor
- Zypliai Manor

== Šalčininkai District Municipality ==
- Gornostajiškiai Manor
- Jašiūnai Manor
- Merkinė Manor
- Mikniškiai Manor
- Norviliškiai Manor
- Šalčininkėliai Manor
- Šalčininkai Manor
- Tabariškiai Manor
- Verseka Manor
- Vilkiškis Manor

== Šiauliai ==
- Didžiadvaris Manor
- Gubernija Manor
- Rėkyva Manor
- Zokniai Manor

== Šiauliai District Municipality ==
- Aleksandrija Manor
- Bubiai Manor
- Gilvyčiai Manor
- Gruzdžiai Manor
- Kuršėnai Manor
- Kurtuvėnai Manor
- Mirskiškė Manor
- Naisiai Manor
- Paežeriai Manor
- Paliesiai Manor
- Varputėnai Manor

== Šilalė District Municipality ==
- Bijotai Manor
- Budriai Manor
- Labardžiai Manor
- Pajūris Manor
- Vaboliai Manor

== Šilutė District Municipality ==
- Macikai Manor
- Šilutė Manor
- Stempliai Manor
- Švėkšna Manor
- Vilkėnas Manor

== Širvintos District Municipality ==
- Astruvka Manor
- Bartkuškis Manor
- Čiobiškis Manor
- Gaideliai Manor
- Gelvonai Manor
- Juodė Manor
- Juodiškiai Manor
- Kernavė Manor
- Lapšiai Manor
- Lemantaučizna Manor
- Levaniškis II Manor
- Liukonys Manor
- Musninkai Manor
- Narvydiškis Manor
- Paširvintis I Manor
- Paširvintis II Manor
- Pociūnai Manor
- Sabališkės Manor
- Šešuolėliai I Manor
- Šešuolėliai II Manor
- Staškūniškis Manor
- Viršuliškės Manor

== Švenčionys District Municipality ==
- Cirkliškis Manor
- Januliškis Manor
- Kaltanėnai Manor
- Liubiškė Manor
- Naujadvaris Manor
- Punžionys Manor
- Račkiškė Manor
- Stanislavavas Manor
- Sudota Manor
- Šventa Manor
- Zalavas Manor

== Tauragė District Municipality ==
- Adakavas Manor
- Batakiai Manor
- Lankininkai Manor
- Lomiai Manor
- Oplankis Manor
- Pagramantis Manor
- Tauragė Manor
- Trepai Manor

== Telšiai District Municipality ==
- Biržuvėnai Manor
- Brėvikiai Manor
- Degaičiai Manor
- Džiuginėnai Manor
- Pašatrija Manor
- Pavirvyčiai Manor
- Siraičiai Manor
- Tryškiai Manor

== Trakai District Municipality ==
- Aukštadvaris Manor, Aukštadvario sen.
- Dusmenos Manor
- Gineitiškės Manor
- Kariotiškės Manor
- Lentvaris Manor
- Raipolis Manor
- Užutrakis Manor

== Ukmergė District Municipality ==
- Aukštieji Svirnai Manor
- Baleliai Manor
- Daumantiškiai Manor
- Jasiuliškis Manor
- Jurdonys Manor
- Kiškeliškis Manor
- Krikštėnai Manor
- Kurėnai Manor
- Laumėnai Manor
- Leonpolis Manor
- Lokinė Manor
- Lyduokiai Manor
- Mikailiškiai Manor
- Padvariai Manor
- Pamūšis Manor
- Paobelis Manor
- Šešuoliai Manor
- Siesikai Manor
- Sližiai Manor
- Šventupė Manor
- Taujėnai Manor
- Užugiris Manor
- Vaitkuškis Manor
- Vaivadiškiai Manor
- Vepriai Manor
- Žemaitkiemis Manor

== Utena District Municipality ==
- Avižieniai Manor
- Bikuškis Manor
- Degsnis Manor
- Jasoniai Manor
- Jotaučiai Manor
- Leliūnai Manor
- Noliškis Manor
- Saldutiškis Manor
- Tauragnai Manor
- Utenėlė Manor
- Utena Manor
- Užpaliai Manor
- Vaikutėnai Manor
- Vyžuonėliai Manor
- Vyžuonai Manor

== Varėna District Municipality ==
- Česukai Manor
- Liškiava Manor
- Mardasavas Manor
- Masališkiai Manor
- Navasodai Manor
- Nedzingė Manor
- Valkininkai Manor
- Martinava Manor

== Vilkaviškis District Municipality ==
- Alvitas Manor
- Bartninkai Manor
- Didvyžiai Manor
- Gižai Manor
- Kataučizna Manor
- Klampučiai Manor
- Paežeriai Manor
- Patilčiai Manor
- Puniška Manor
- Putinai Manor
- Rasiai Manor
- Rumokai Manor
- Šūkliai Manor
- Vilkaviškis Manor
- Vinkšnupiai Manor

== Vilnius ==
- Abramavičiai Palace
- Bžostovskiai Palace
- Chodkevičiai Palace
- Lopacinskiai Palace (Bernardinai st.)
- Lopacinskiai Palace (Skapo st.)
- Pac Palace
- Palace of the Grand Dukes of Lithuania
- Presidential Palace, Vilnius
- Raduškevičius Palace
- Radziwiłł Palace, Vilnius
- Sapieha Palace, Vilnius
- Seimas Palace
- Slushko Palace
- Šuazeliai Palace
- Tiškevičiai Palace (Vilnius)
- Tyzenhaus Palace
- Verkiai Palace
- Vileišis Palace
- Antaviliai Manor
- Kairėnai Manor
- Markučiai Manor
- Pilaitė Manor
- Pučkoriai Manor
- Trakų Vokė Manor
- Tuskulėnai Manor
- Verkiai Manor

== Vilnius District Municipality ==
- Anavilis Manor
- Bezdonys Manor
- Baltoji Vokė Manor
- Bareikiškiai Manor
- Buivydiškiai Manor
- Buivydžiai Manor
- Bukiškiai Manor
- Galinė Manor
- Glitiškiai Manor
- Jonėnai Manor
- Karvis Manor
- Kaušiadala Manor
- Liubavas Manor
- Maišiagala Manor
- Mozūriškiai Manor
- Nemėžis Manor
- Pailgė Manor
- Peteša Manor
- Pikeliškiai Manor
- Punžonys Manor
- Raudondvario Manor (Nemenčinė)
- Raudondvaris Manor (Riešė)
- Rudamina Manor
- Šriubiškiai Manor
- Sudervė Manor
- Šumskas Manor
- Sužioniai Manor
- Vėriškiai Manor
- Vyžulėnai Manor

== Zarasai District Municipality ==
- Antazavė Manor
- Astraučizna Manor
- Didžiadvaris Manor
- Kamariškiai Manor
- Luodžiai Manor
- Mukuliai Manor
- Narkyčiai Manor
- Raudinė Manor
- Smalvos Manor
- Stelmužė Manor
- Suviekas Manor
- Turmantas Manor
- Vasaknos Manor
- Žvilbučiai Manor

== See also ==
- Lithuanian nobility
- List of castles in Lithuania
- List of hillforts in Lithuania
