= Gliaudeliai =

- Village
- Location within Lithuania
- Coordinates: 55.988°N 25.006°E
- Country: Lithuania
- County: Panevėžys County
- First mention: 1673 as village of Salamiestis Manor 1820 as Gliaudeliai Folwark

Population
  - Total: 14
- Time zone: Eastern European Time (UTC+2)
  - Summer (DST): Eastern European Summer Time (UTC+3)

Gliaudeliai is a village in Kupiškis District Municipality, Panevėžys County, Lithuania. The village covers an area of some 174 ha (430 acres). Its population was 53 in 1979, and 14 in 2011.
