= Paežeriai Manor =

Paežeriai Manor may refer to:

- Paežeriai Manor (Šiauliai)
- Paežeriai Manor (Vilkaviškis)
