= Bulakavas Manor =

Coordinates: 54°16′43″N 23°23′36″E

- Interactive map of the Bulakavas Manor area

General information
- Type: Residential manor
- Location: Bulotiškė, Lithuania

Bulakavas Manor is a former residential manor in Bulotiškė village, Lazdijai District Municipality, Lithuania.
