= Antašava Manor =

Coordinates: 55°54′32″N 24°48′22″E

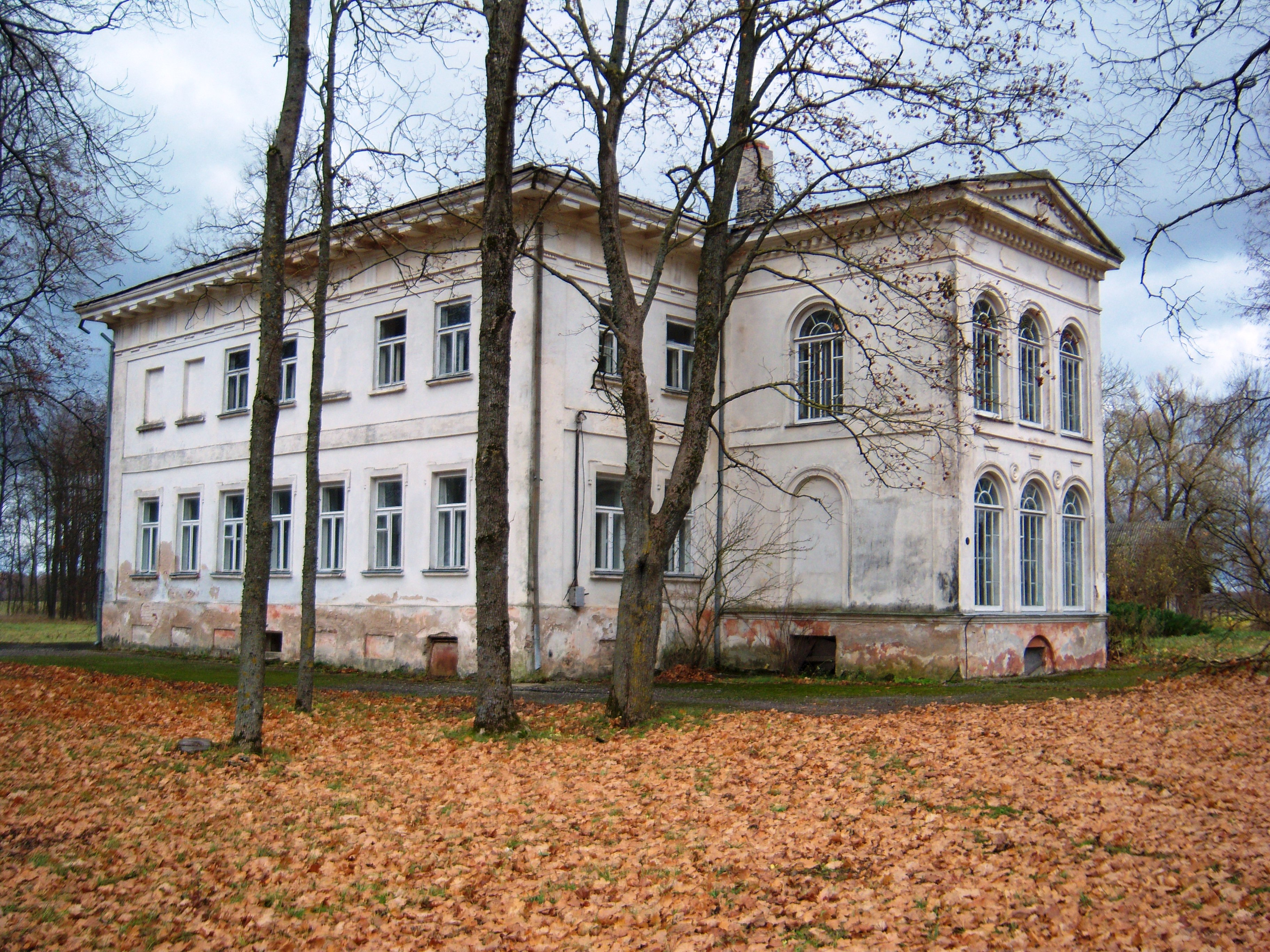
- Antašava Manor
- Interactive map of the Antašava Manor area

General information
- Type: Residential manor
- Location: Antašava, Lithuania

Antašava Manor is a former residential manor in Antašava, Kupiškis district.
