= Jakiškiai Manor =

Former residential manor in Lithuania

Coordinates: 56°10′49″N 23°31′51″E

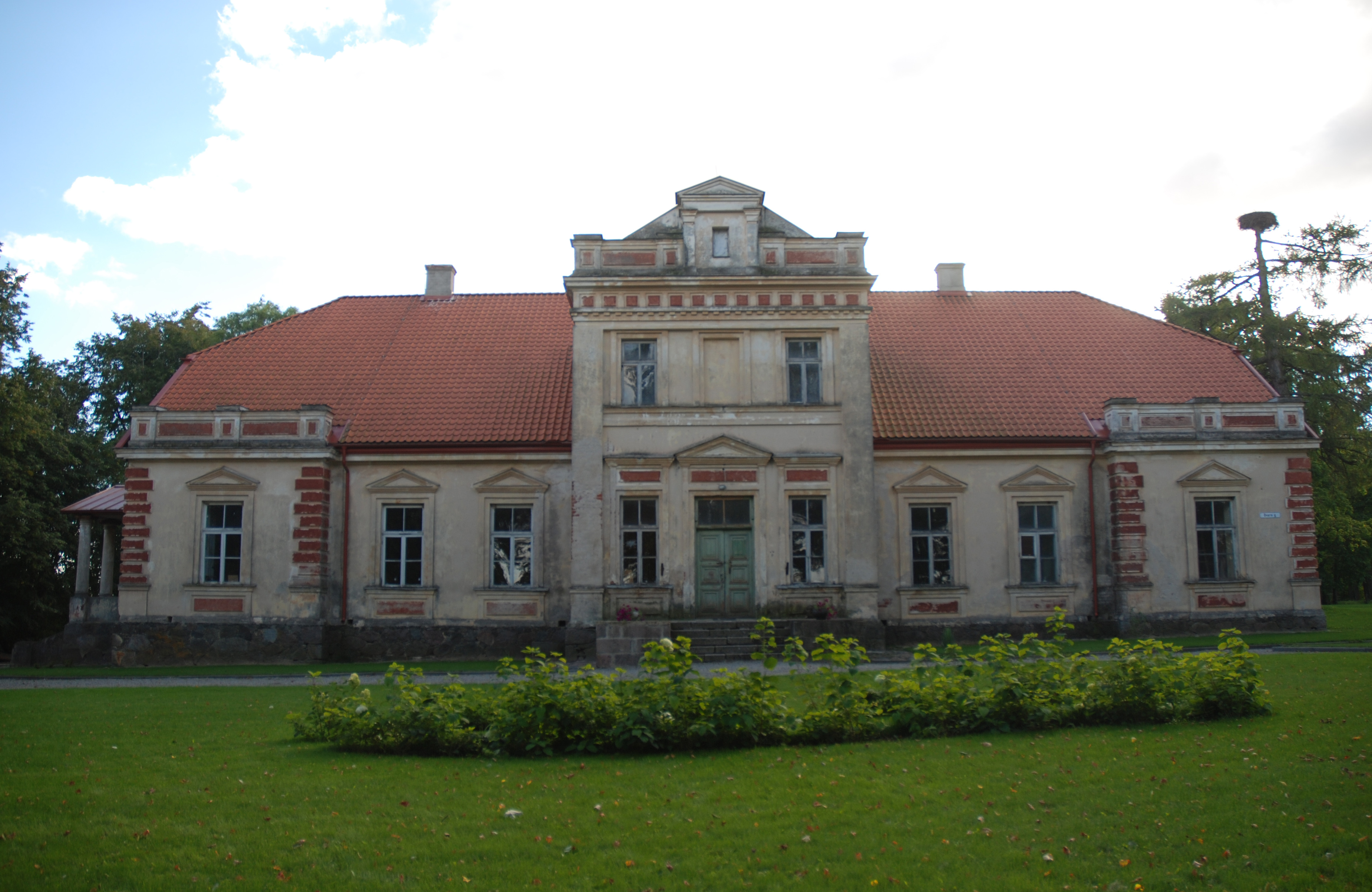
Jakiškiai Manor in 2010

Jakiškiai Manor was a former residential manor in Jakiškiai village, Joniškis District Municipality, Lithuania.
