= Jotaučiai Manor =

Coordinates: 55°32′52″N 25°43′10″E

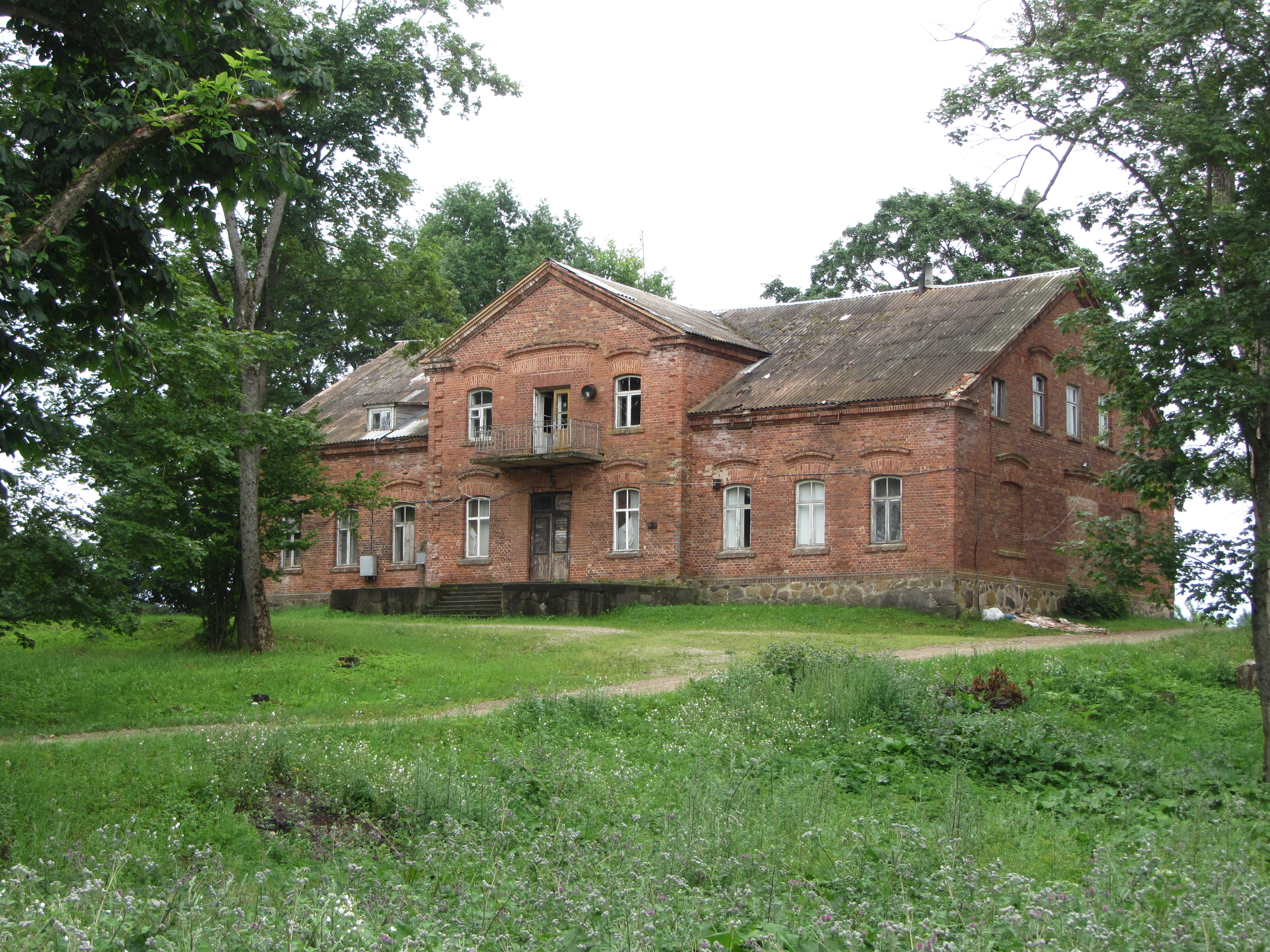

Jotaučiai Manor was a former residential manor in Jotaučiai village, Utena District Municipality, Lithuania.
