= Biliūnai Manor =

Coordinates: 55°19′59″N 23°10′53″E

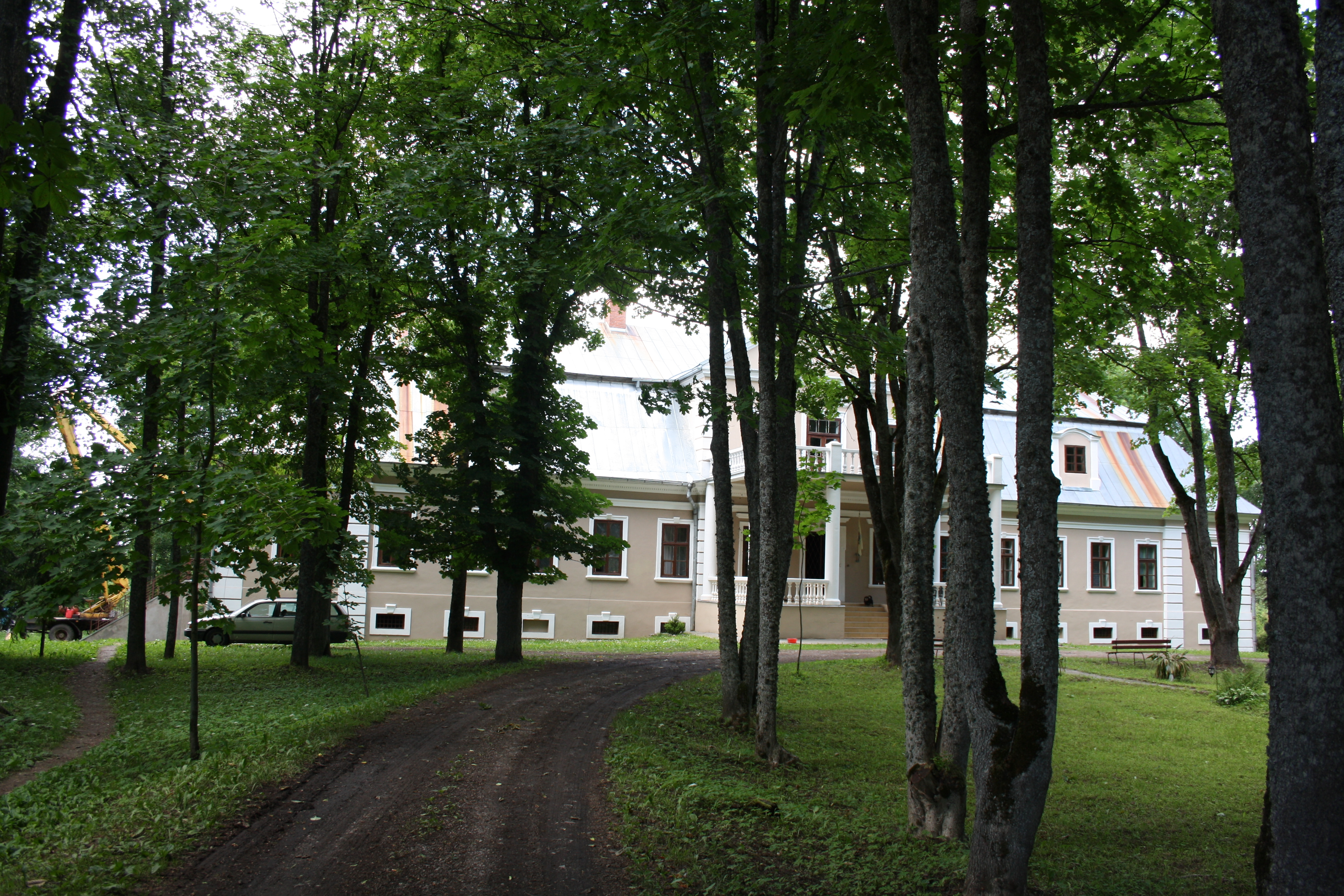
Biliūnai Manor (2011)

Biliūnai Manor is a residential manor near Girkalnis in Raseiniai District Municipality. Currently it is occupied by heiress Bernadeta Elena Kaminskaitė-Žagarnauskienė.
