= Žeimiai Manor =

Coordinates: 55°10′59″N 24°13′50″E

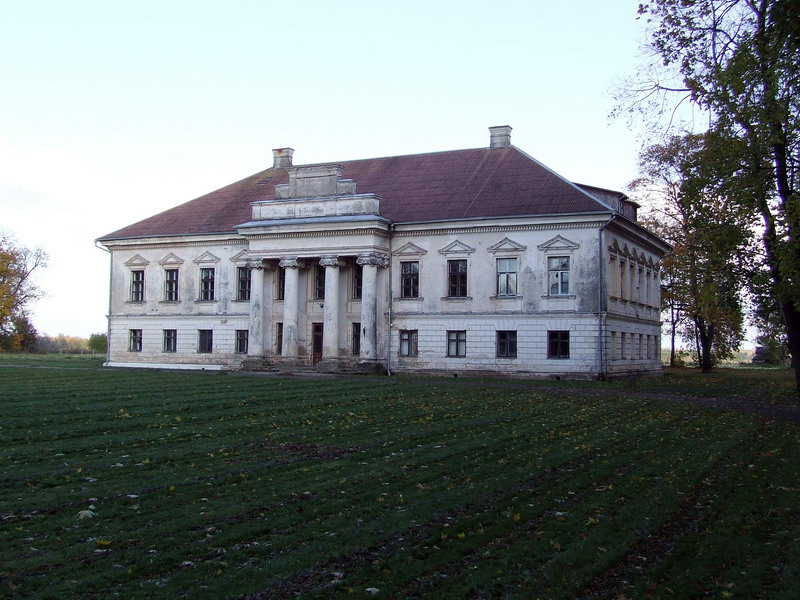
Žeimiai Manor (2009)

Žeimiai Manor is a former residential manor in Žeimiai, Jonava District, Lithuania. The manor was first mentioned in historical sources at the end of the 15th century and has been owned by several noble families over the centuries.

== History ==
The manor initially belonged to the families of Zaviša, Čekavičiai, Navrilkovičiai, and Medekša in the 18th century. From 1780 until World War II, the manor was owned by the Kossakowski family. The manor house is an example of late Classical Revival architecture, featuring two floors with strictly symmetrical forms and a main façade decorated with large pillars.

=== 19th and 20th centuries ===
During the 19th century, the manor underwent significant changes. The manor house used to have 25 rooms with Dutch Delftware tile furnaces. In front of the manor house, there is a former servants' house, now a granary. Another building, which used to be of the same size, was turned into stables in the 19th century. The manor is surrounded by a park with a linden tree alley leading to the road Jonava-Šėta.

=== Modern era ===
In 2000, the manor was sold and has since been used for cultural events, art projects, educational programs, and community celebrations. There are plans to prepare the manor for reconstruction, restore and renew the buildings, and adjust the manor for cultural tourism.
