= Pagryžuvys Manor =

Coordinates: 55°36′19″N 23°7′56″E

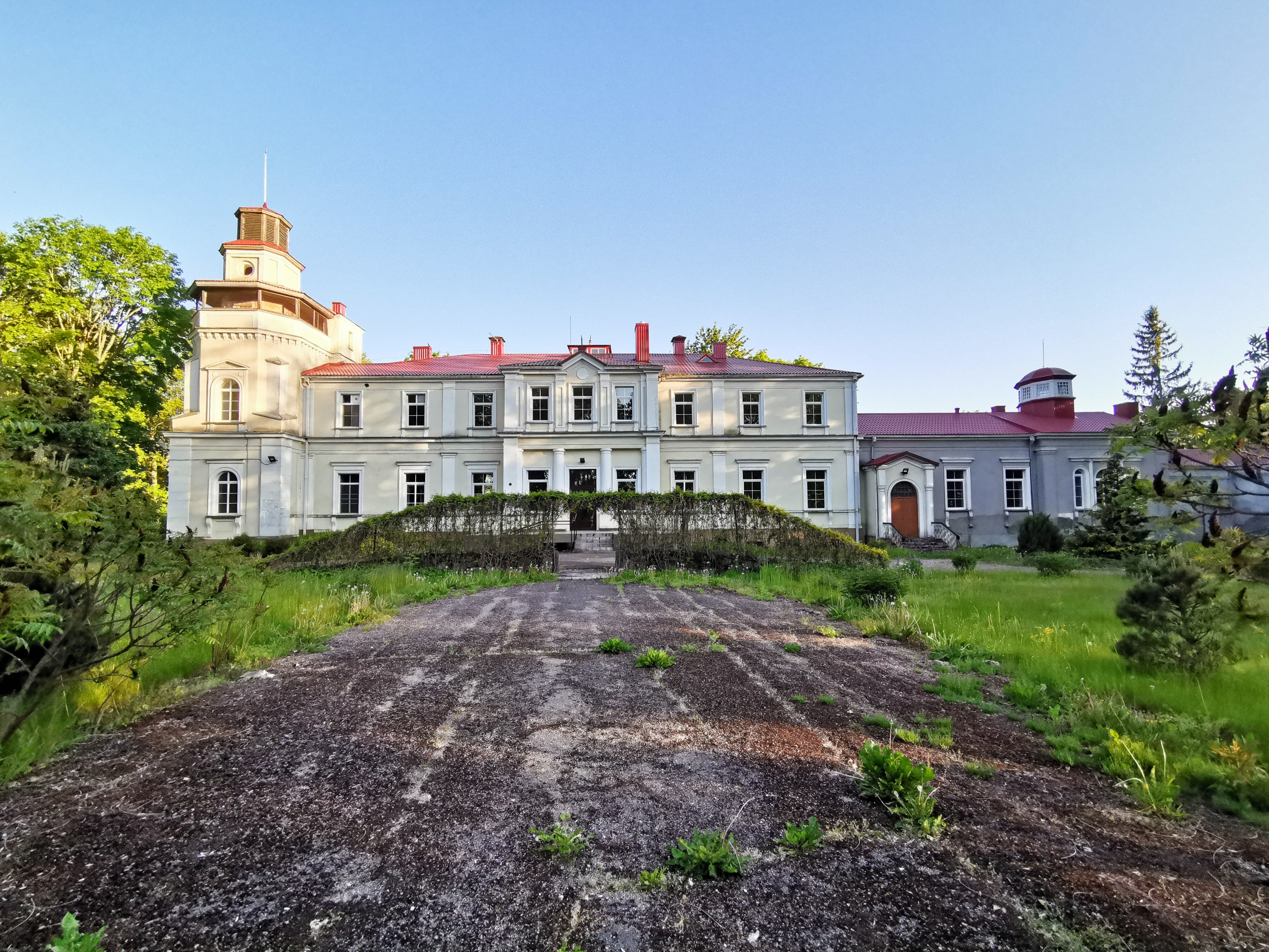
Pagryžuvys Manor in 2020

Pagryžuvys Manor is a former residential manor in Pagryžuvys village, Kelmė District Municipality, Lithuania, on the right shore of Gryžuva.

The manor belongs to the noble family of Šemeta (Semeta). Yet to be returned to family following soviet land-grab.

The family is well known in Lithuanian churches and monasteries history - the Vilnius Cathedral, Pazaislis monastery (Pacas and Semeta).

This particular manor, same as many in other locations, were forcefully taken away by the soviet regime. They were fully furnished with expensive furniture, art collection, jewelry, family portraits, books, clothes and other personal belongings.

The family was being persecuted by the brutal soviet regime, because the owner is the founder of Lithuanian military. Russians tried to erase the family and all links to Lithuanian heritage for many years. Semeta, together with Radziwiłł family, were participating in a partisan movement to restore independence. Soviets used various forms of aggression and propaganda. Killing at home or deporting to Siberia. Only few survived. Most common propaganda - all anti-Christian values, such as stealing, perversion, non-noble behavior - everything to justify genocide and taking family homes with treasures.

== Gallery ==
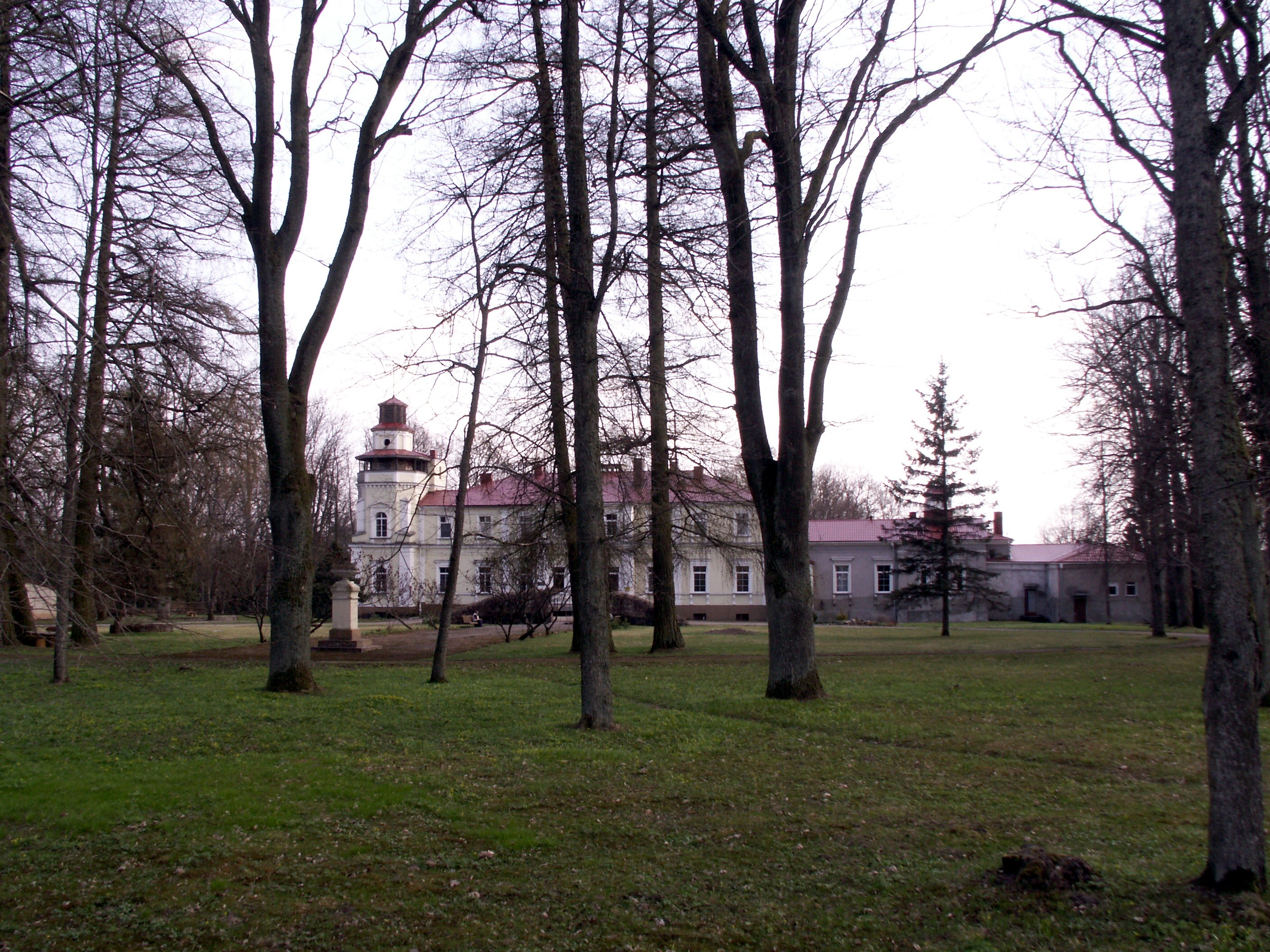
Pagryžuvis Manor

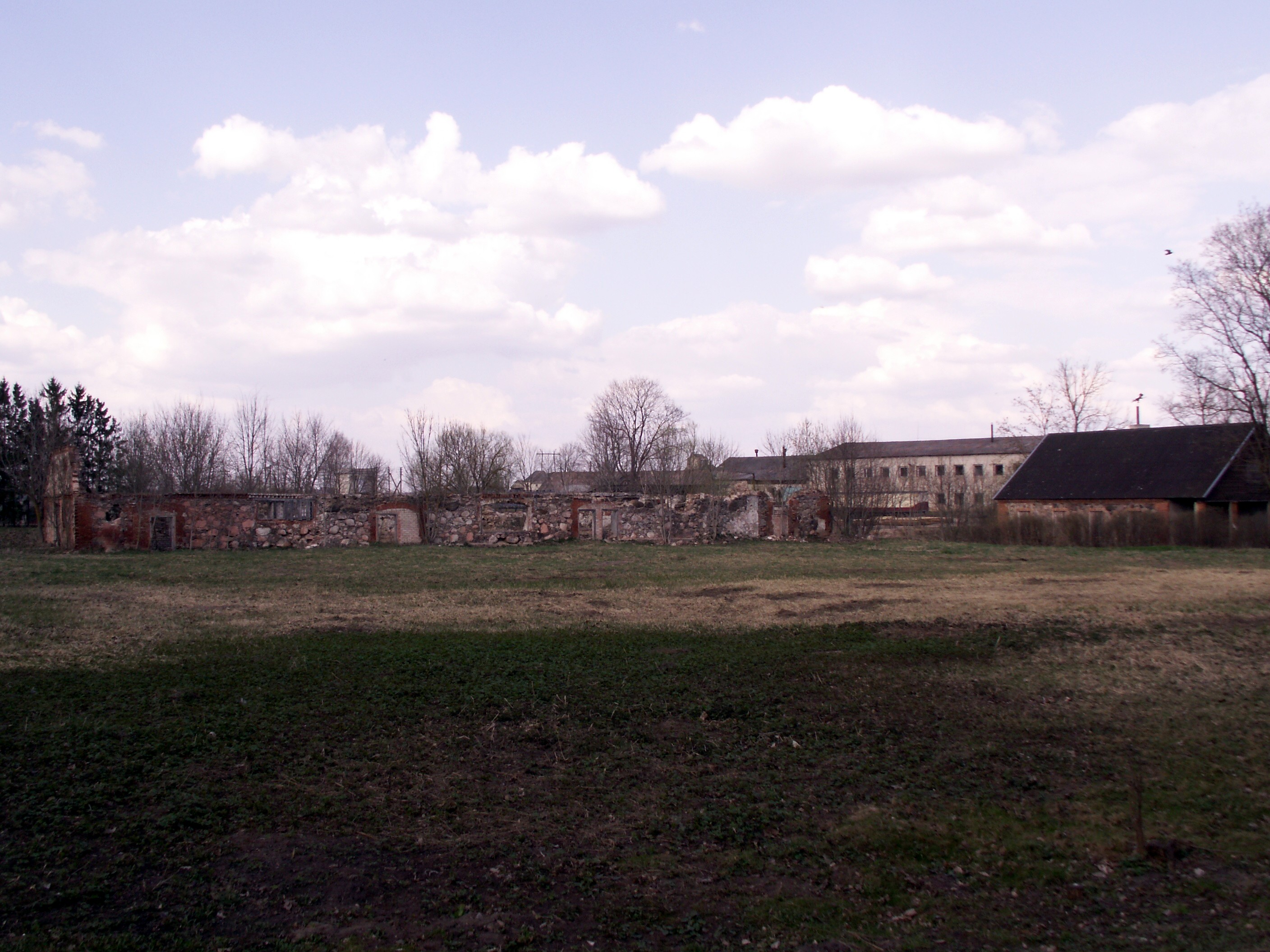
Remains of outbuildings

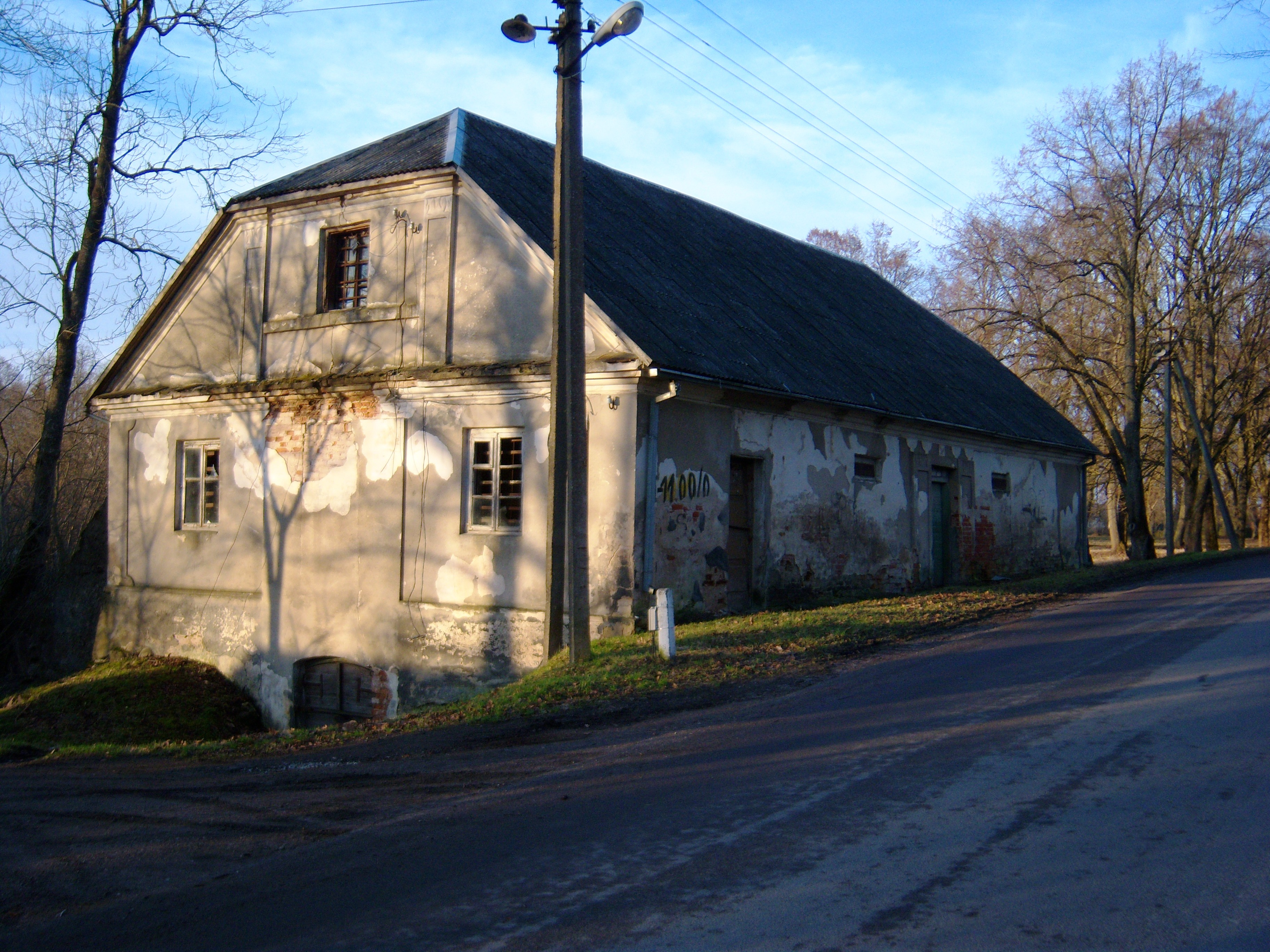
Barn

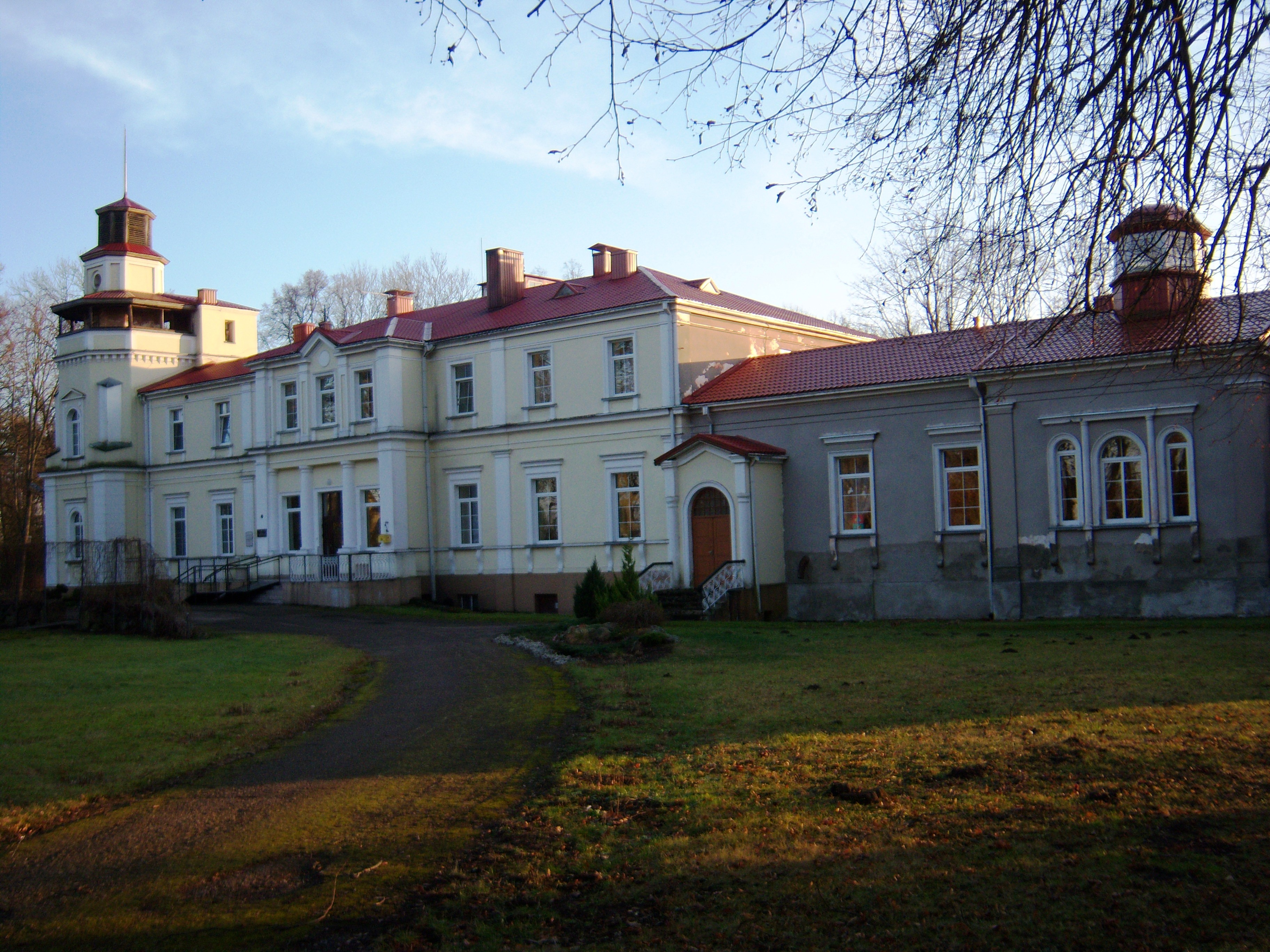
