= Jieznas Manor =

Coordinates: 54°35′53″N 24°10′29″E

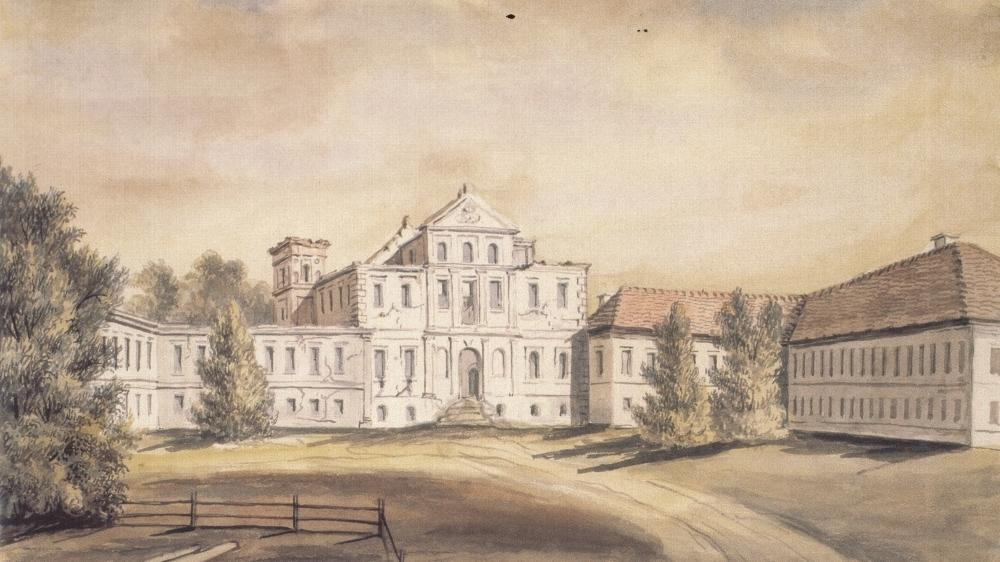
Jieznas Manor (1875)

Jieznas Manor was a historic manor house in Jieznas, Lithuania. Only the workshop with a former kitchen, laundry room and servants room remain.
