= Kairėnai Manor =

Coordinates: 54°44′0″N 25°24′6″E

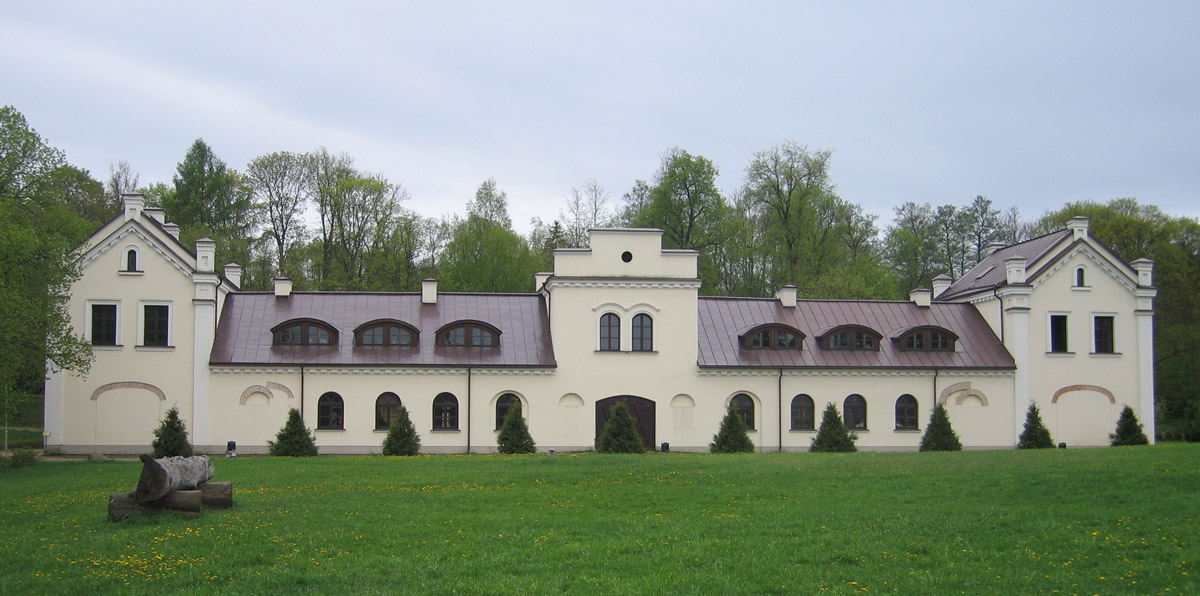
Former stables of Kairėnai Manor

Kairėnai Manor was a residential manor in Kairėnai near Vilnius, Lithuania. Only a few buildings and park survived until nowadays. Currently its territory is occupied by the Botanical Garden of Vilnius University.
