= Beržėnai Manor =

Coordinates: 55°49′33″N 24°48′50″E

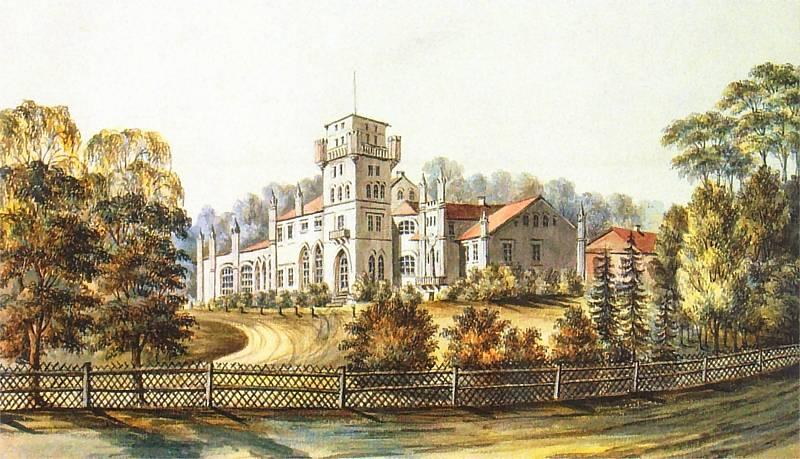
- Beržėnai Manor (by Napoleon Orda)
- Interactive map of the Beržėnai Manor area

General information
- Type: Residential manor
- Architectural style: Neo-Gothic
- Location: Beržėnai, Lithuania
- Completed: 1840
- Renovated: 1885–1887

Technical details
- Floor count: 4

Beržėnai Manor is a former residential manor in Beržėnai village, Kelmė district.

It was built in 1840 by Adolf Czapski and modified in 1885–1887. The palace in Neo-Gothic style consists of some parts with one or two floors, connected to a four-floor tower where the main entrance is situated.

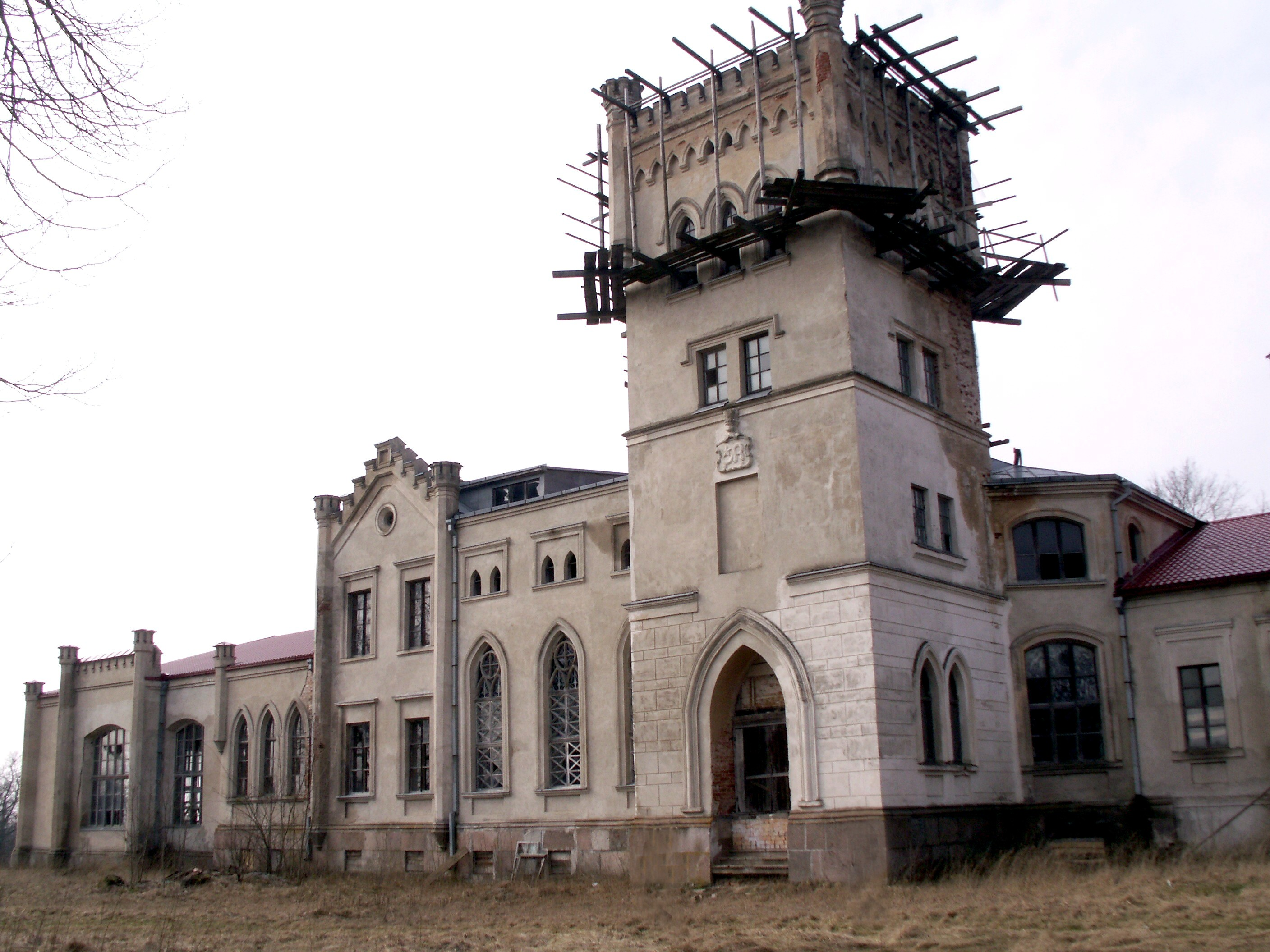
Beržėnai Manor (2008)

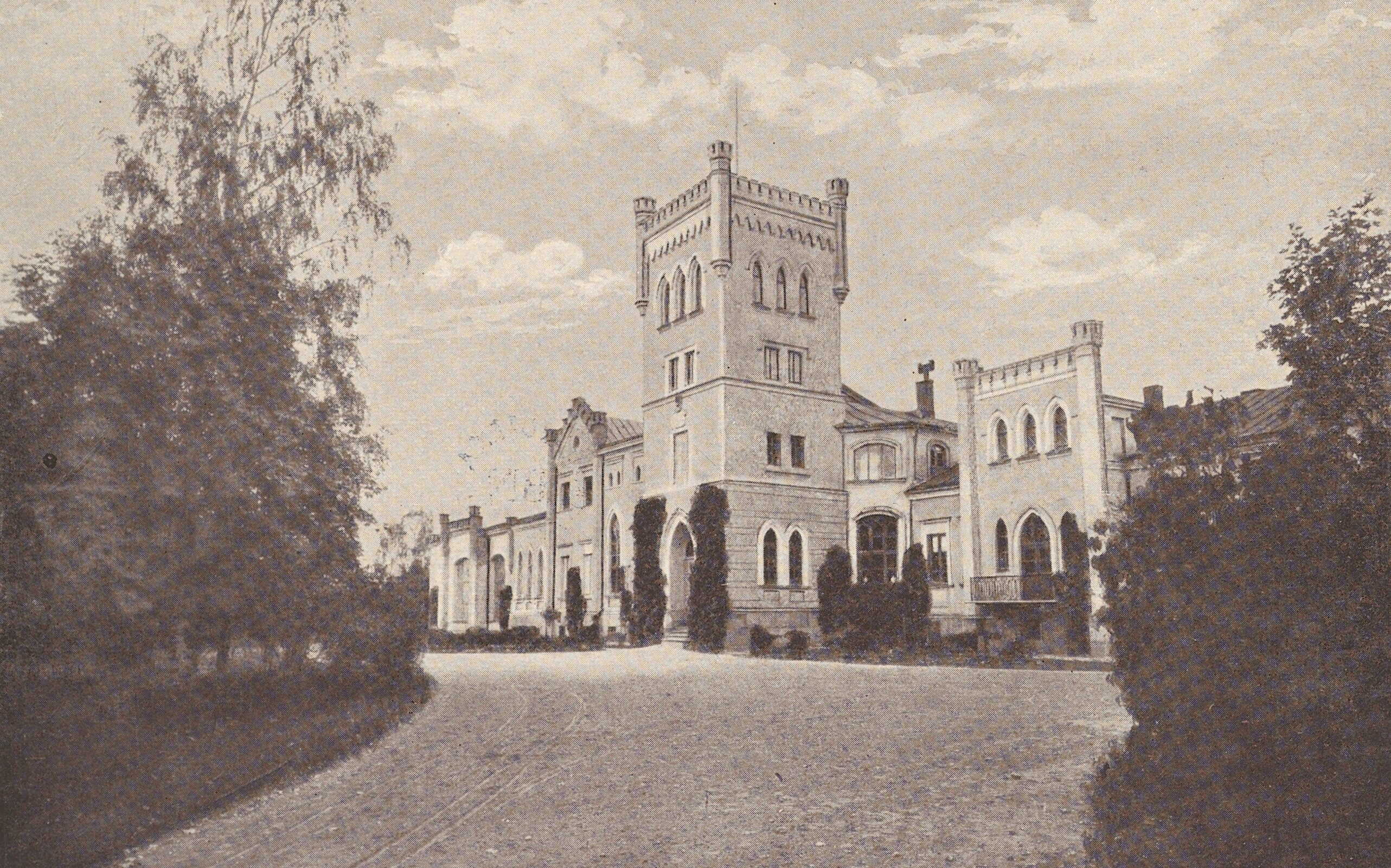
Palace before 1911
