= Ariogala Manor =

Coordinates: 55°15′46″N 23°30′26″E

- Interactive map of the Ariogala Manor area

General information
- Type: Residential manor
- Location: Ariogala, Lithuania

Ariogala Manor is a former residential manor in Raseiniai district, close to Ariogala city.

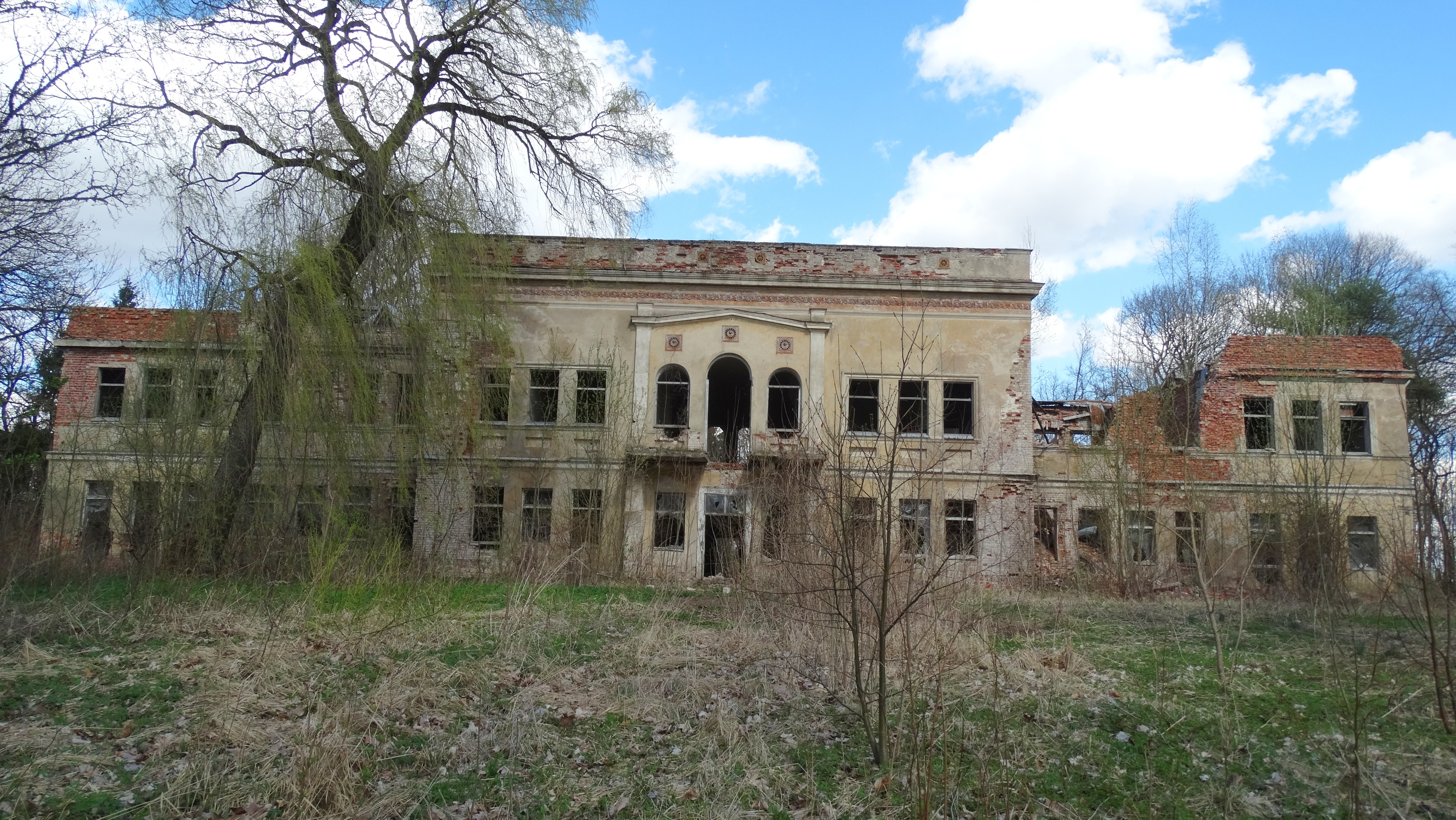
Ariogala, Čekuvos dvaras
