= Leonpolis Manor =

Former residential manor

Coordinates: 55°12′54″N 24°42′58″E

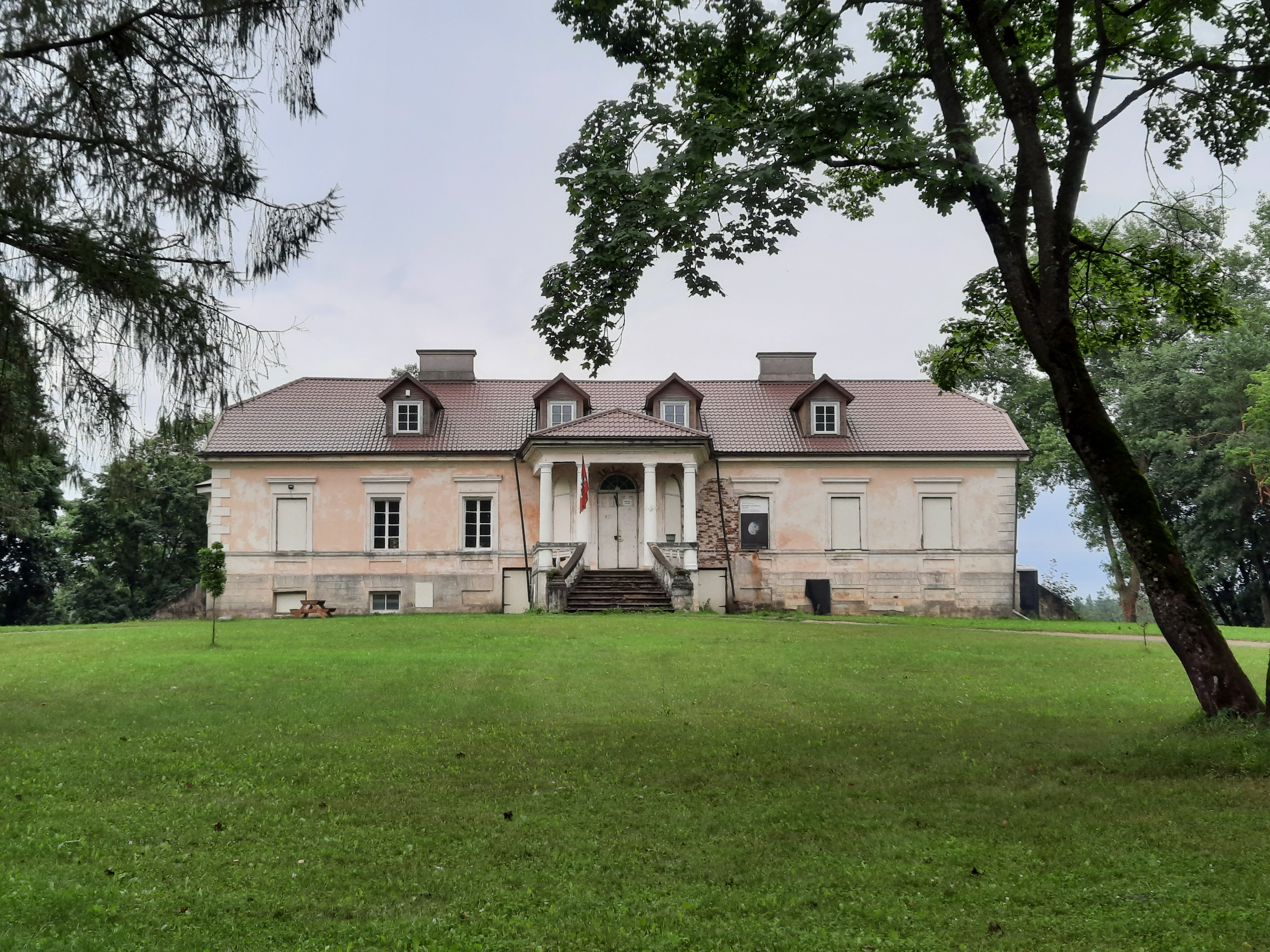
Leonpolis manor

Leonpolis Manor is a former residential manor in Leonpolis village, Ukmergė district.
