= Alanta Manor =

Coordinates: 55°20′48″N 25°19′30″E

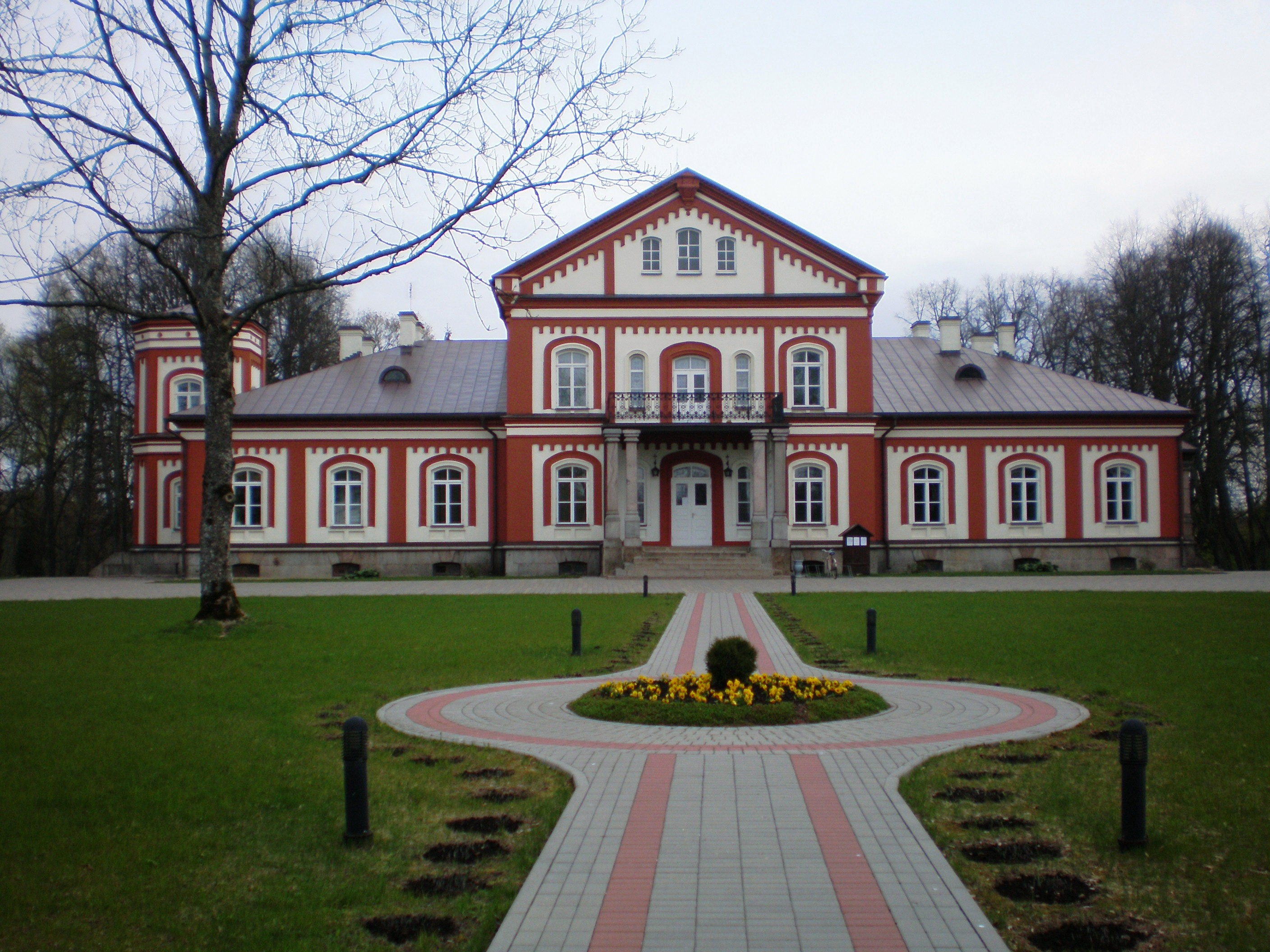
Alanta Manor (2007)

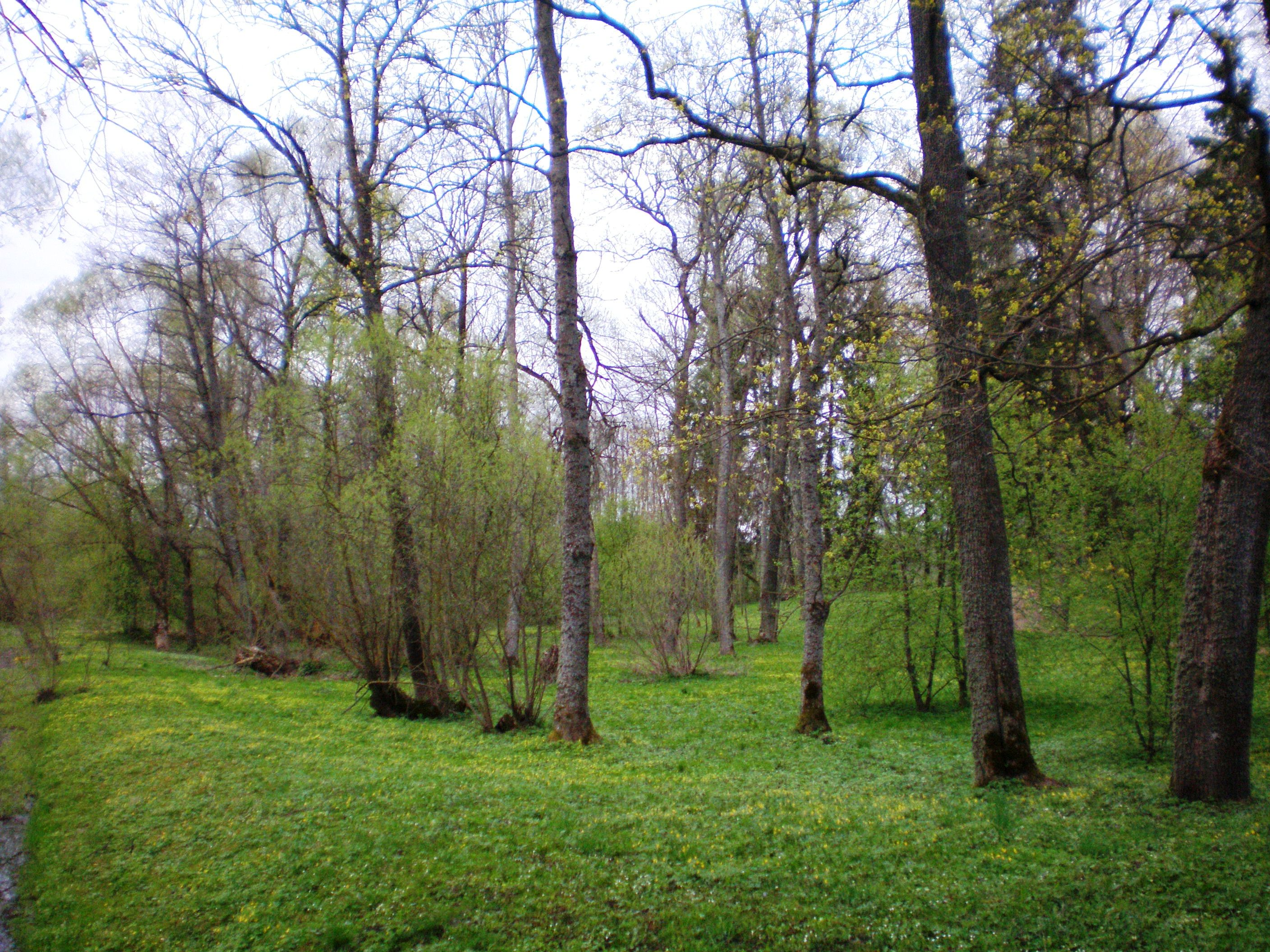
Alanta Manor park

Alanta Manor is a former residential manor in Naujasodis, Molėtai district.
