= Bartkuškis Manor =

Coordinates: 54°56′29″N 24°56′6″E

- Interactive map of the Bartkuškis Manor area

General information
- Type: Residential manor
- Location: Bartkuškis, Lithuania

Bartkuškis Manor is a former residential manor in Bartkuškis village, Širvintos District Municipality.
