= Dautarai Manor =

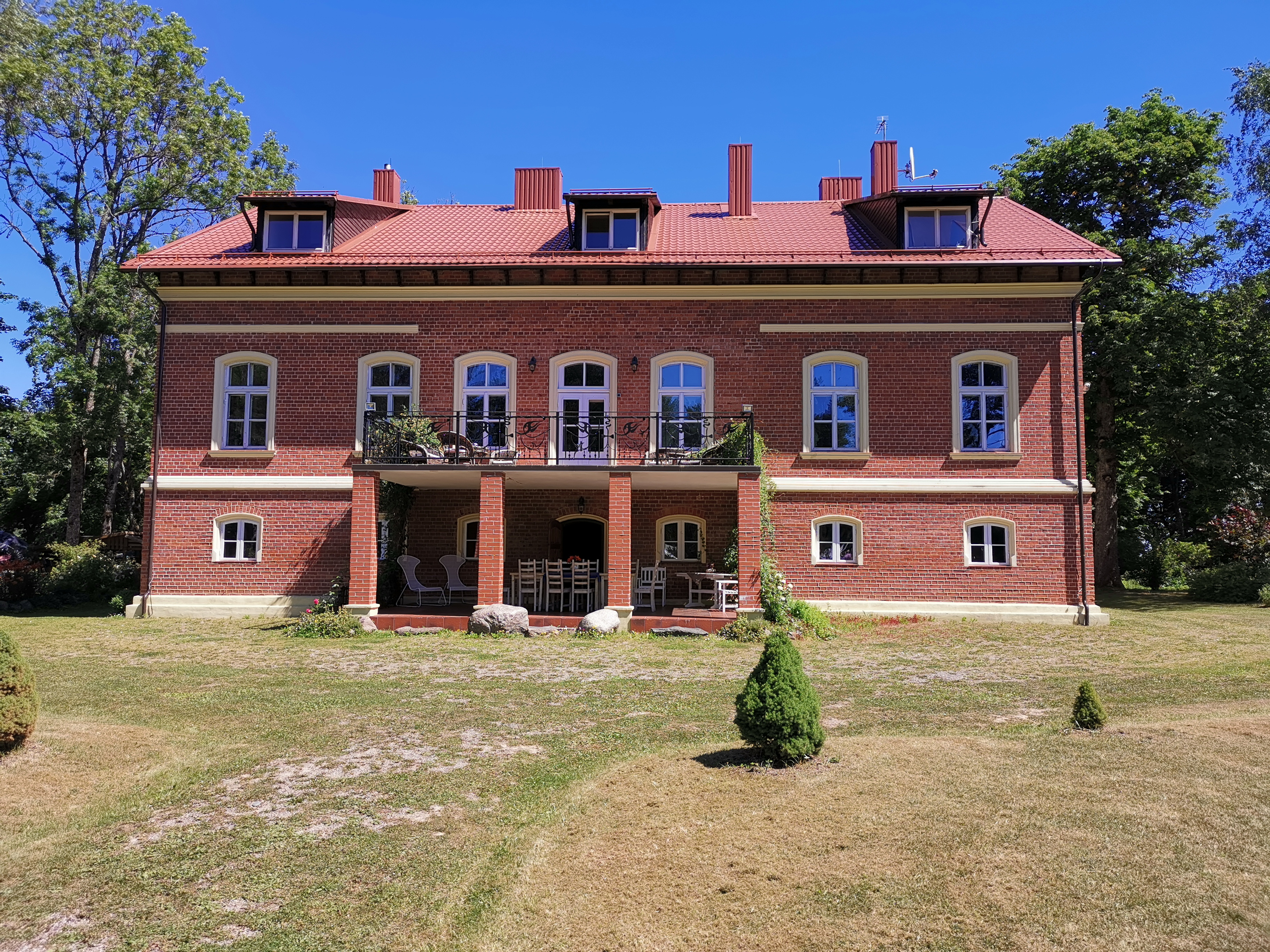

- Location within Lithuania

General information
- Architectural style: Historicism
- Location: Dautarai, Židikai elderate, Lithuania
- Coordinates: 56°23′10″N 22°0′51″E
- Completed: Beginning of 20th century
- Client: von Bocks

Dautarai Manor (Lithuanian: Dautarų dvaras) is a former residential manor in Dautarai village, Mažeikiai District Municipality, Lithuania. It was reconstructed and reopened in 2013.

== History ==
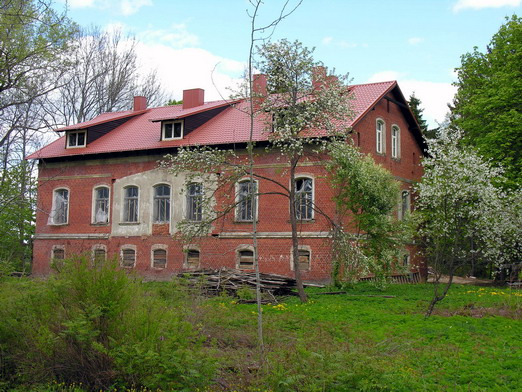
Dautarai manor in 2006 during its restoration

In 1870, the Dautarai Manor was purchased by German nobles from the von Bock family. According to an 1896 inventory, the property included a manor house and eight other buildings.

The current manor house was built at the beginning of the 20th century by German contractors in a style popular in Latvia (Dautarai is located near the Latvia–Lithuania border). In 1910, the estate was inherited by Boris von Bock, officer in the Imperial Russian Navy and a diplomat. His wife Maria was a daughter of Russian Prime Minister Pyotr Stolypin, who visited the estate in 1911. Boris von Bock retired from the diplomatic service and decided to live in the Dautarai Manor.

During the First World War, the German army established food and fodder warehouse there. In 1933, the estate was acquired by the Nasvyčiai family. By 1939, the estate was reconstructed and renewed. During the Soviet occupation of Lithuania, the estate was nationalized. A public school and flats for poor families were established in the manor house. Later it was abandoned and started to deteriorate.

After the re-Establishment of the State of Lithuania, the ownership of the estate was returned to the Nasvyčiai family. The estate was eventually sold to Gražina and Antanas Juknevičiai who had started the renovation works in 2005. It was reopened to the public as a banquet hall in 2013. Since 2013, Dautarai Manor hosts an annual Jazz and classical music festival Musical Summer in Dautarai Manor.

== Architecture ==
Dautarai Manor is different from traditional Lithuanian manors both by its measurements and architecture.
