= Lančiūnava Manor =

Coordinates: 55°20′56″N 24°9′8″E

- Lančiūnavos dvaras
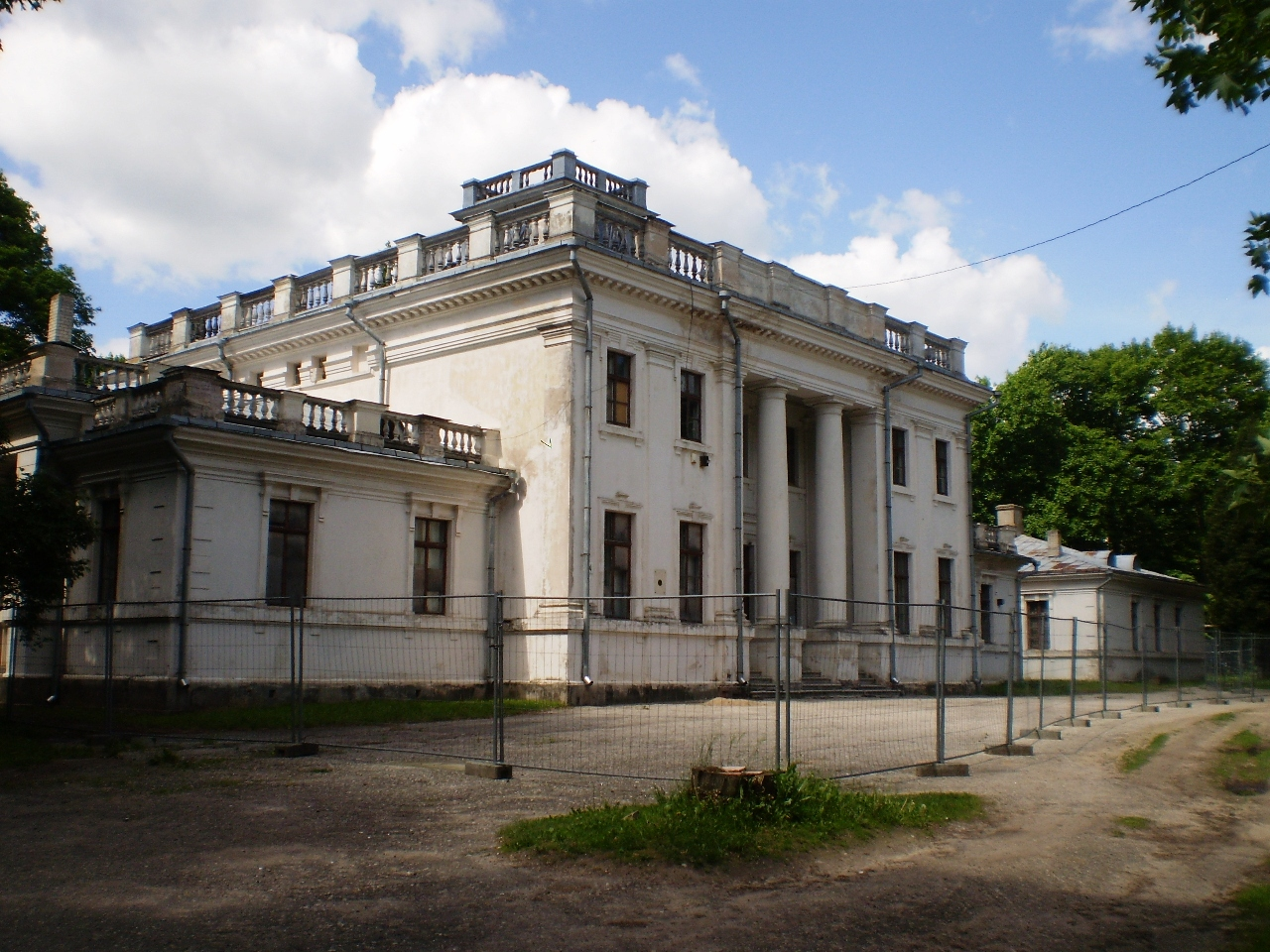
- Lančiūnava Manor in 2010

General information
- Architectural style: Neoclassical
- Location: Lančiūnava, Kaunas County, Lithuania
- Year built: 16th century

Lančiūnava Manor is a historic manor complex in Lančiūnava, Kėdainiai District Municipality, Lithuania. First recorded in the late 16th century, the estate belonged to the Kognowicki family from 1740. Its present Neoclassical palace was built in the 1870s, with its design inspired by the Palace on the Isle in Warsaw's Łazienki Park. The building consists of a central two-storey section flanked by single-storey wings, with a recessed columned portico.

The manor complex also includes the Church of St. Casimir, completed in 1880, several surviving outbuildings and a landscaped park established in the 19th century. Nationalized in 1940, the palace was converted into an agricultural school and later housed an agricultural technical college. Following the restoration of Lithuanian independence, the property was privatized and subsequently fell into disrepair.
