= Butautai Manor =

Coordinates: 56°17′15″N 24°36′14″E

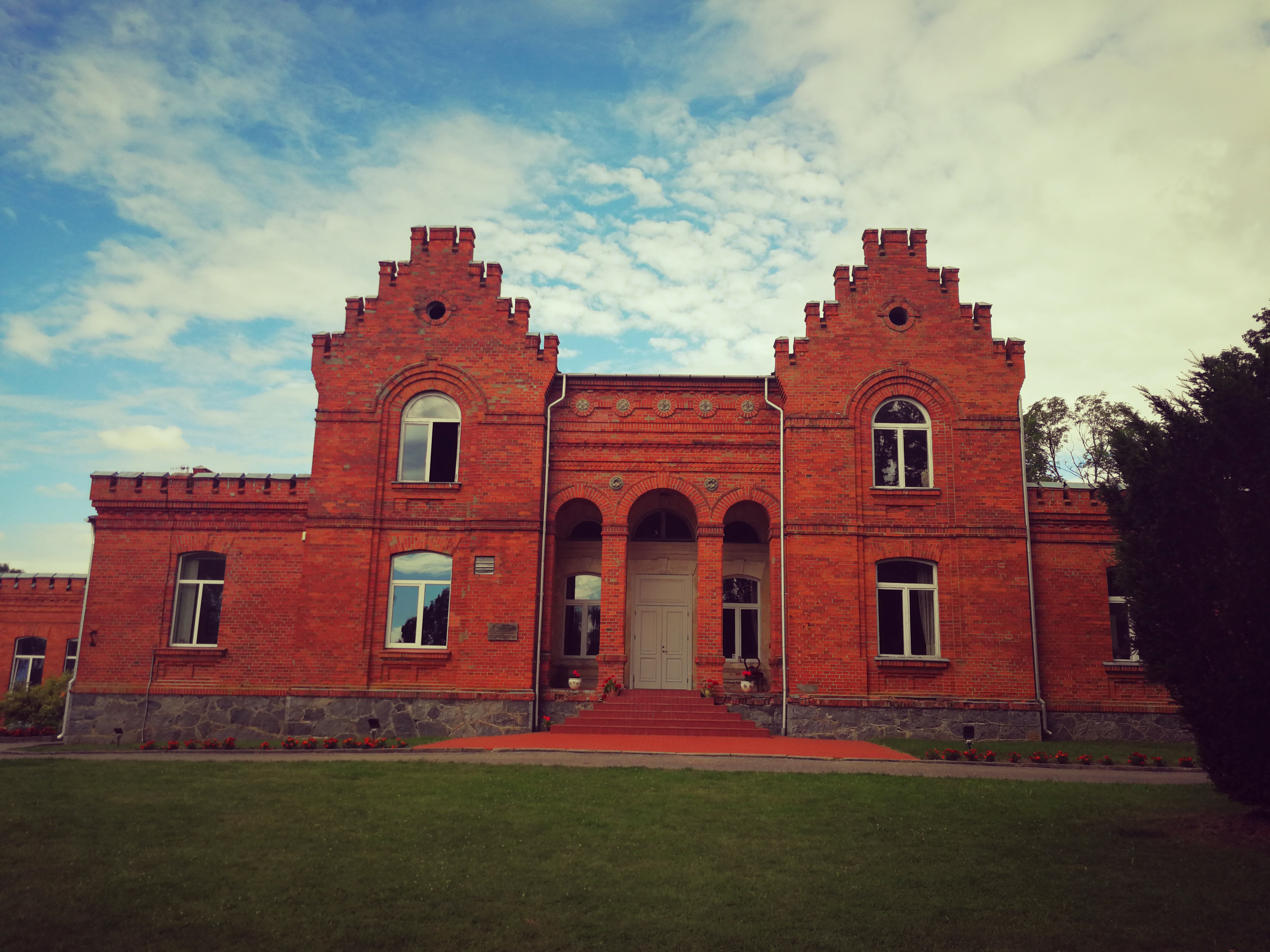
- Butautai Manor
- Interactive map of the Butautai Manor area

General information
- Type: Residential manor
- Location: Butautai, Lithuania

Butautai Manor is a former residential manor in Butautai, Biržai District Municipality.
