= Tyszkiewicz Palace, Vilnius =

Tyszkiewicz Palace
- Tiškevičių rūmai
- Main façade of Tyszkiewicz Palace

General information
- Architectural style: Neoclassical
- Location: Vilnius Old Town, Lithuania, 1 Trakų Street
- Coordinates: 54.6797°N 25.2784°E
- Owner: Vilnius Gediminas Technical University

Design and construction
- Architects: Laurynas Gucevičius; Tomasz Tyszecki

Tyszkiewicz Palace (Lithuanian: Tiškevičių rūmai), also known as the Palace with Atlantes, is a historic Neoclassical palace at 1 Trakų Street in the Old Town of Vilnius, Lithuania. Originally developed in the 17th century, the palace was remodelled in 1783 by architect Laurynas Gucevičius for the noble Karp family. It acquired much of its present appearance during a reconstruction undertaken in 1839 by architect Tomasz Tyszecki for Count Józef Michał Tyszkiewicz. Its most distinctive architectural feature is a balcony supported by two sculpted atlantes, added in the mid-19th century.

The palace subsequently underwent further expansion and alterations and today belongs to the Vilnius Gediminas Technical University and houses the Faculty of Creative Industries and the Faculty of Architecture.
