= Zabieliai Palace =

Coordinates: 54°53′47″N 23°53′07″E

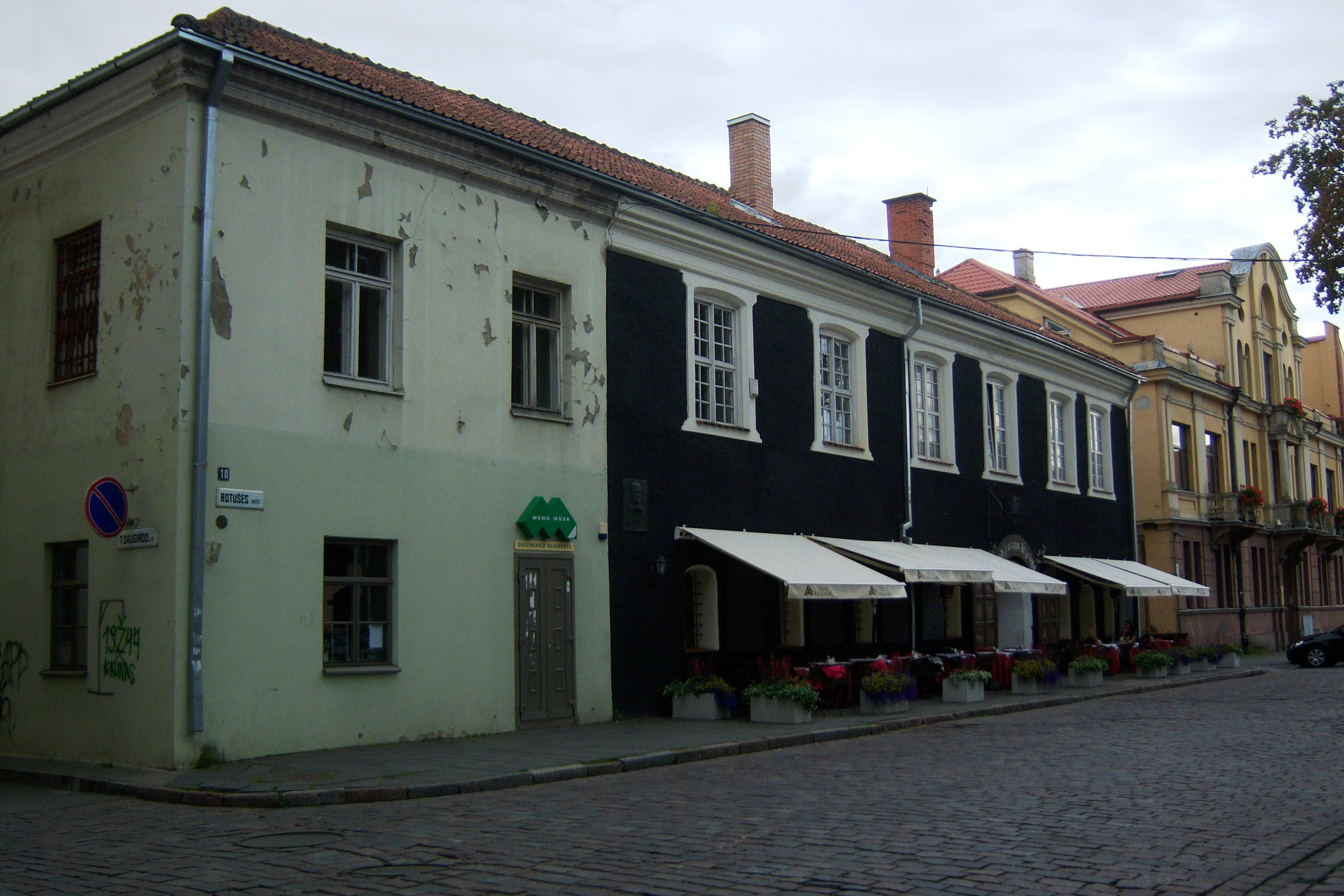
Zabieliai Palace, Kaunas

Zabieliai Palace is a former residential palace in Kaunas Old Town, at the corner of T.Daugirdo street and Kaunas Town Hall square. Currently it is occupied by restaurant "Medžiotojų užeiga" (English: "Hunters dry").
