= Ilguva Manor =

Coordinates: 55°3′50″N 23°19′29″E

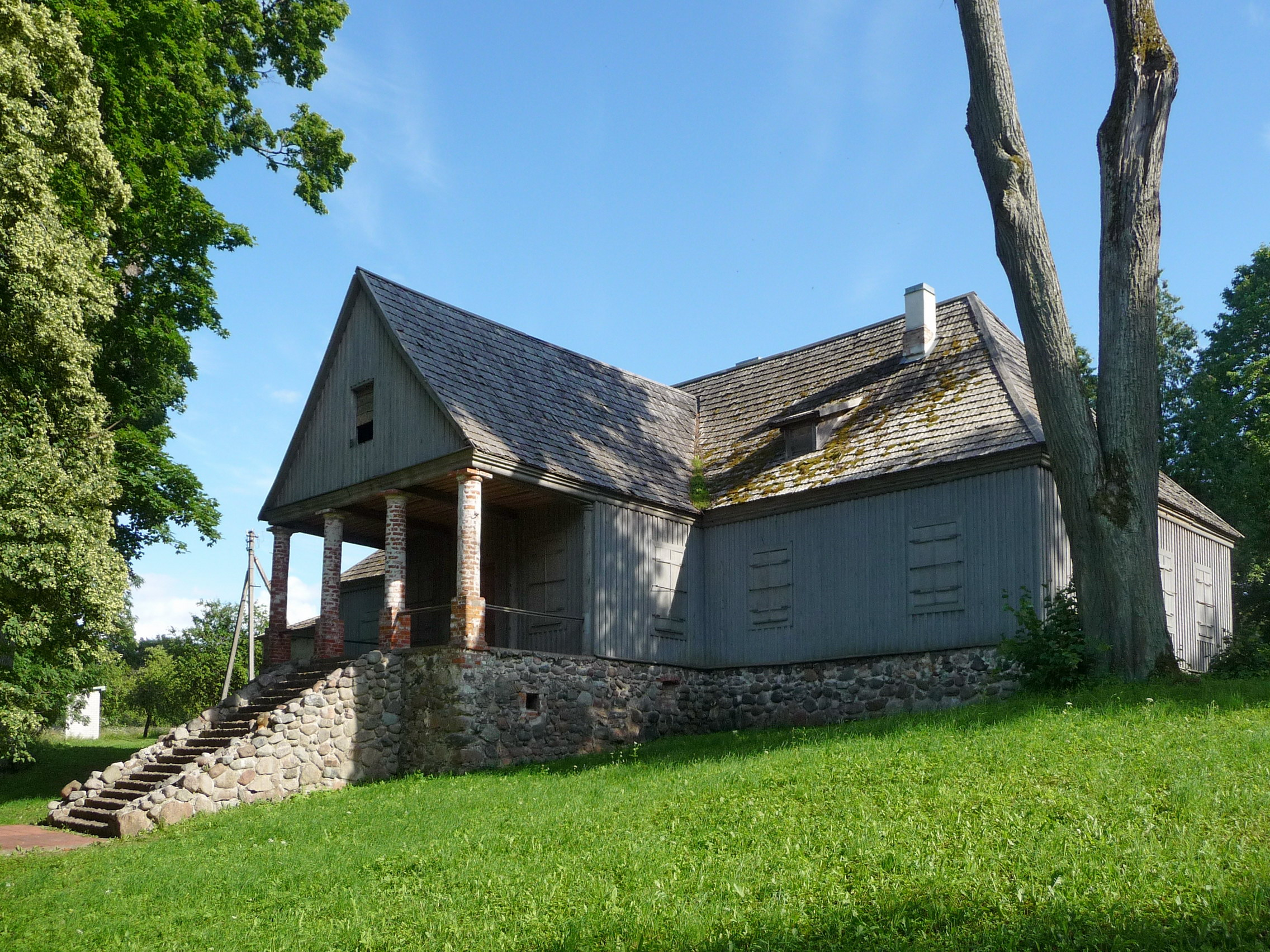
Ilguva Manor (2009)

Ilguva Manor salon

Ilguva Manor (pol. Dwór w Iłgowie) is a former residential manor in Ilguva village, Šakiai district, in Lithuania.
