= Daukšiagirė Manor =

Manor house in Lithuania

Coordinates: 54°42′59″N 24°4′21″E

- Daukšiagirės dvaras
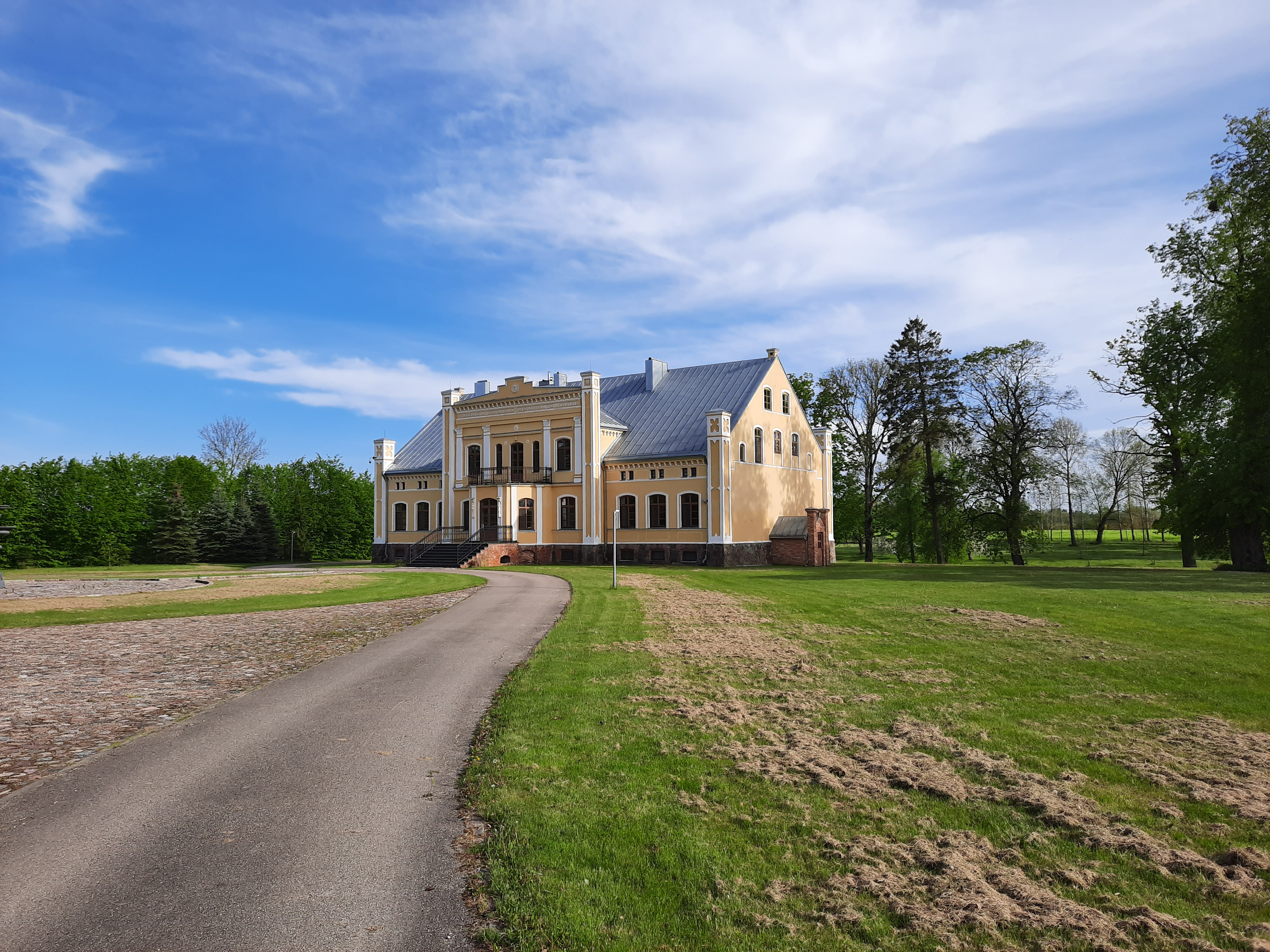
- Daukšiagirė Manor in 2020
- Interactive map of the Daukšiagirė Manor area

General information
- Location: Daukšiagirė, Pakuonio Eldership, Prienai District Municipality, Kaunas County, Lithuania
- Years built: Original: undetermined Remnants: late 19th century

Daukšiagirė Manor is a former residential manor in Daukšiagirė village, Prienai District Municipality, Lithuania.
