= Dūkštas Manor =

Coordinates: 55°32′37″N 26°19′24″E

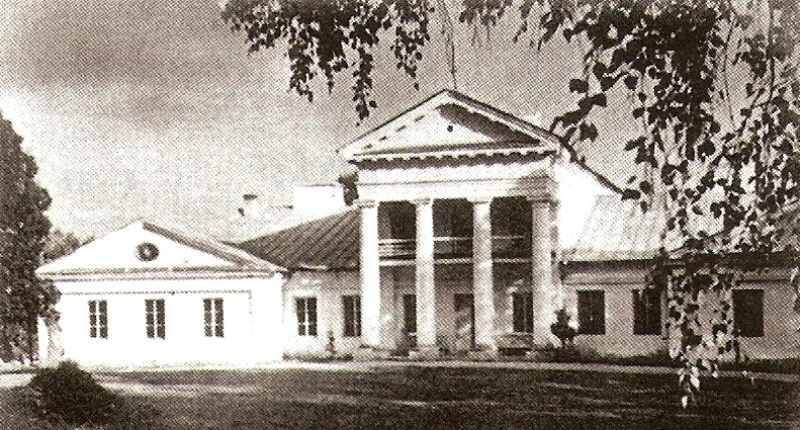
Dūkštas Manor (1935)

Dūkštas Manor is a former residential manor in Dūkšteliai village, Ignalina District Municipality, Lithuania. Reconstruction works of the manor began in 2005; however, it was stuck until 2010 when it was continued.
