= Pac Palace =

Building in Vilnius, Lithuania

Coordinates: 54°40′54″N 25°17′14″E

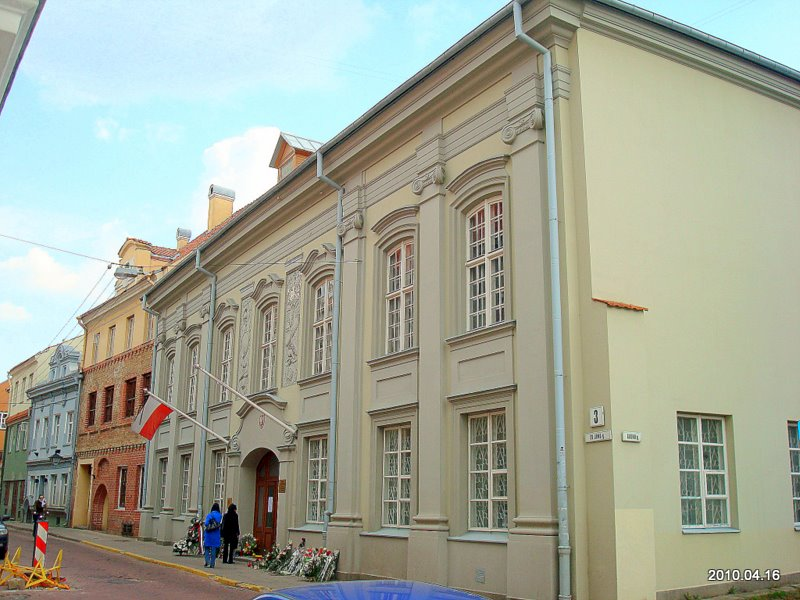
Pacai Palace

Pac Palace is a building in the Old Town of Vilnius, Lithuania, on Šv. Jonų street, close to Vilnius University. Currently it houses the Polish embassy.

== History ==
In 1628, the Lithuanian Grand Scribe Stefan Krzysztof Pac purchased the parcel with the house from Starosta of Samogitia Hieronim Wołłowicz. The new owner began a major renovation of the building, which was completed before 1633.The building was rectangular in plan with a courtyard facade reaching the street frontage. Through the gate, above which was a representative hall, one went straight out onto the street.

Their son, Krzysztof Zygmunt Pac, became the next owner of the building. In 1655, during the Russo-Polish War, the Palace at St. John Street burnt down. The Palace was rebuilt after the War. After the death of Krzysztof Zygmunt Pac, the palace passed into the possession of his distant relative Michał Kazimierz Pac. The next owner was a cousin of Jan Kazimierz – Józef Franciszek Pac. In 1748, the Baroque Palace burnt down again. Neither Józef Franciszek Pac nor his son Michał Jan Pac, who was the last descendant of the previously rich and influential family, were able to rebuild it. In 1771, for political reasons, Jan Pac was forced to emigrate, and his possessions were sequestered. In 1783, the ruined palace was acquired by the Grand Chancellor of Lithuania, Aleksander Michał Sapieha. He rebuilt the Palace and decorated it in the contemporary Classical style.

In 1793, the Palace was inherited by the son of Aleksander Michał and Magdalena Lubomirska – Franciszek Sapieha, General of Artillery. After the November Uprising (1830–1831) and two years after his death, the Russian authorities confiscated the Palace from his son, Eustachy Kajetan Sapieha, for his involvement in the uprising, and allocated it as the Seat of the Governor. In 1909, the Sapieha Palace became the Russian club. In 1912, the Palace was again rebuilt by Architect Aleksandr Sonin and accommodated the Russian Noble's Assembly. Prior to the First World War, the premises belonged to the Ministry of Interior. There was a bookstore, an art gallery and a wine shop. In 1918, the Lithuanian Association, “Rūta”, worked here, and in 1919 it was the seat of the Christian Labor (Trade) Unions. The Polish authorities were other tenants and they accommodated some state institutions here.

After the Second World War, the Palace of the Pac family was allocated for many years to communications workers. For some time, there was a long-distance telephone exchange and a telegraph station. In 1959, the Palace was rebuilt and partly restored by architects Justinas Šeibokas and Bronislovas Krūminis. The building was then adapted to the needs of the Culture House of Communication Workers, and some apartments were also furnished. In 1978–1991 the Palace was once again restored. The last restoration, which took place in the 1990s, was conducted by the Polish Monuments Restoration Laboratories (PKZ).

On 27 July 2007, a contract was signed and the Palace of the Pac family was officially purchased by the Ministry of Foreign Affairs of the Republic of Poland with the purpose of accommodating the Embassy, the Consulate General and the Polish Institute in Vilnius here.

== Architecture ==
Pacai Palace is a two-floor building with an inner yard. It is a Baroque building, but the baroque decorations have not survived.

== Bibliography ==
- Czyż, Anna Sylwia (2021). Pałace Wilna XVII–XVIII wieku [Palaces of Vilnius 17th-18th centuries] (in Polish). Warsaw: Narodowy Instytut Polskiego Dziedzictwa Kulturowego za Granicą POLONIKA.
