= Diktariškiai Manor =

Coordinates: 55°39′11″N 23°26′45″E

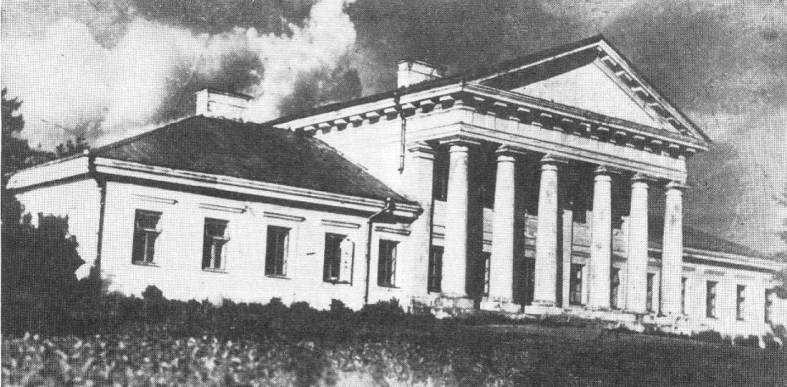
Diktariškiai Manor (about 1939)

Diktariškiai Manor is a former residential manor in Diktariškiai village, Radviliškis District Municipality.

== History ==
Pranciškus Šemeta, one of the commanders of the November Uprising, was born in the Diktariškiai Manor in 1802.
