= Aštrioji Kirsna Manor =

Coordinates: 54°18′16″N 23°23′30″E

General information
- Type: Residential manor
- Location: Aštrioji Kirsna, Lithuania

Aštrioji Kirsna Manor (English: Spicy Kirsna Manor) is a former residential manor in the village of Aštrioji Kirsna, Lazdijai district, Alytus County, Lithuania.
