= Gruzdžiai Manor =

Coordinates: 56°5′20″N 23°14′16″E

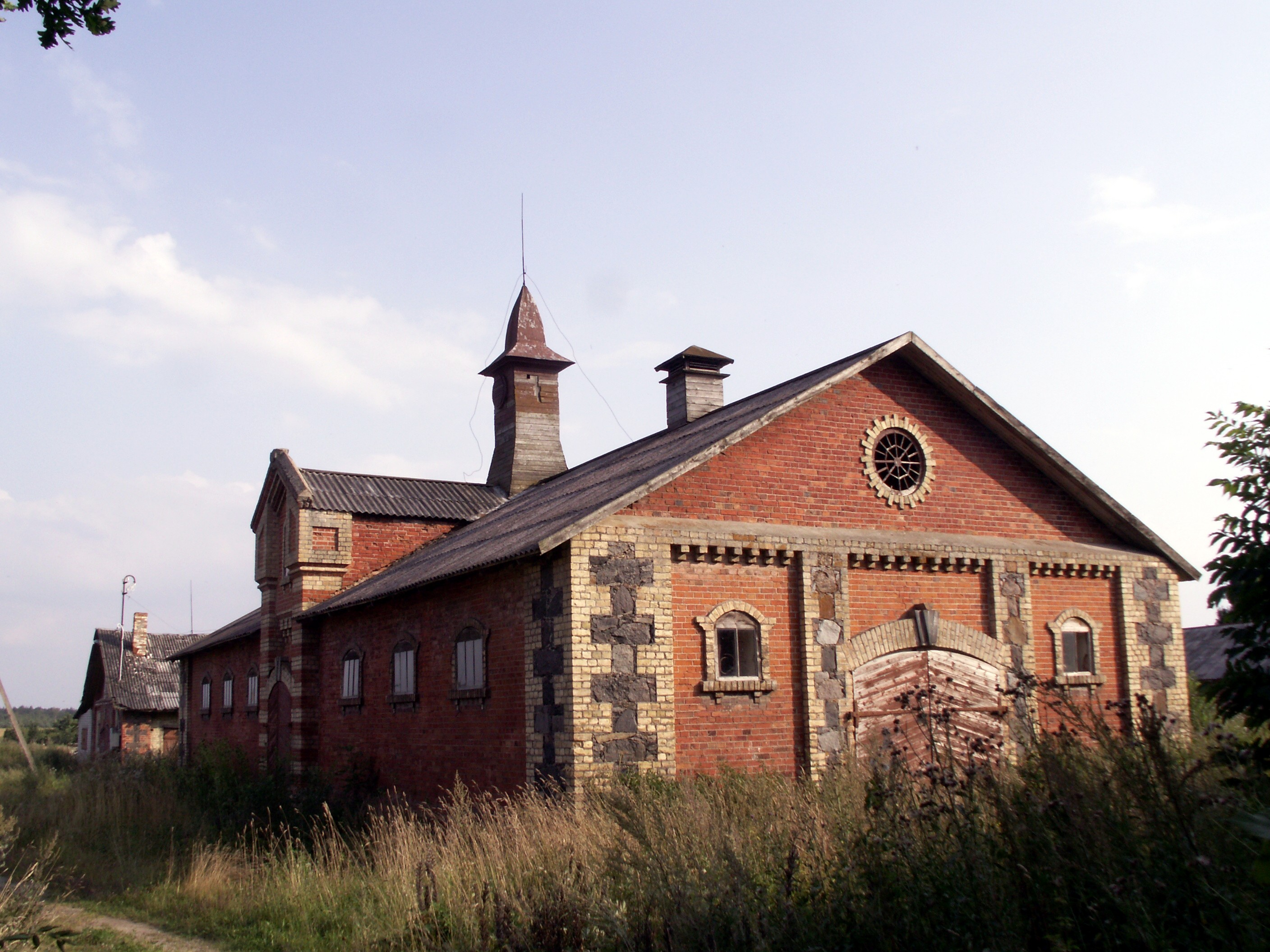
Manor in Gruzdžiai, Šiauliai district, Lithuania

Gruzdžiai Manor was a former residential manor in Gruzdžiai, Šiauliai County, Lithuania. Currently it is used as a Gruzdžiai Agricultural School.
