= Žemaitkiemis Manor =

Coordinates: 55°19′7″N 24°57′46″E

Žemaitkiemis Manor is a former residential manor in Žemaitkiemis, Ukmergė District Municipality.
