= Skaraitiškė Manor =

Coordinates: 55°28′16″N 23°12′45″E

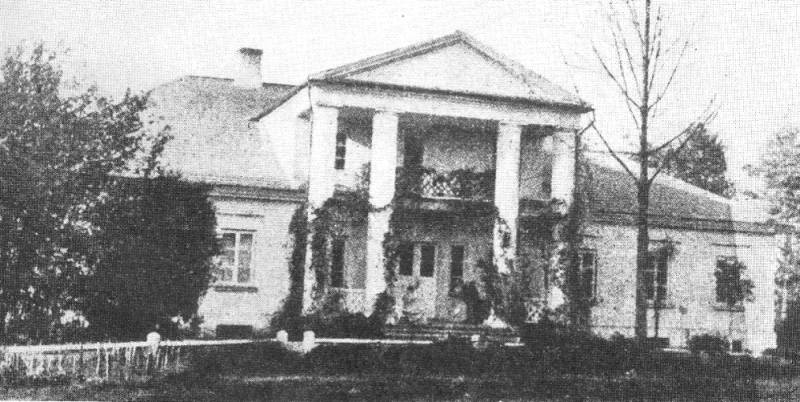
Skaraitiškės Manor (about 1930)

Skaraitiškė Manor is a former residential manor in Skaraitiškė village, Raseiniai District Municipality, Lithuania.
