= Šalčininkai Manor =

Coordinates: 54°18′43″N 25°23′36″E

- Šalčininkų dvaras
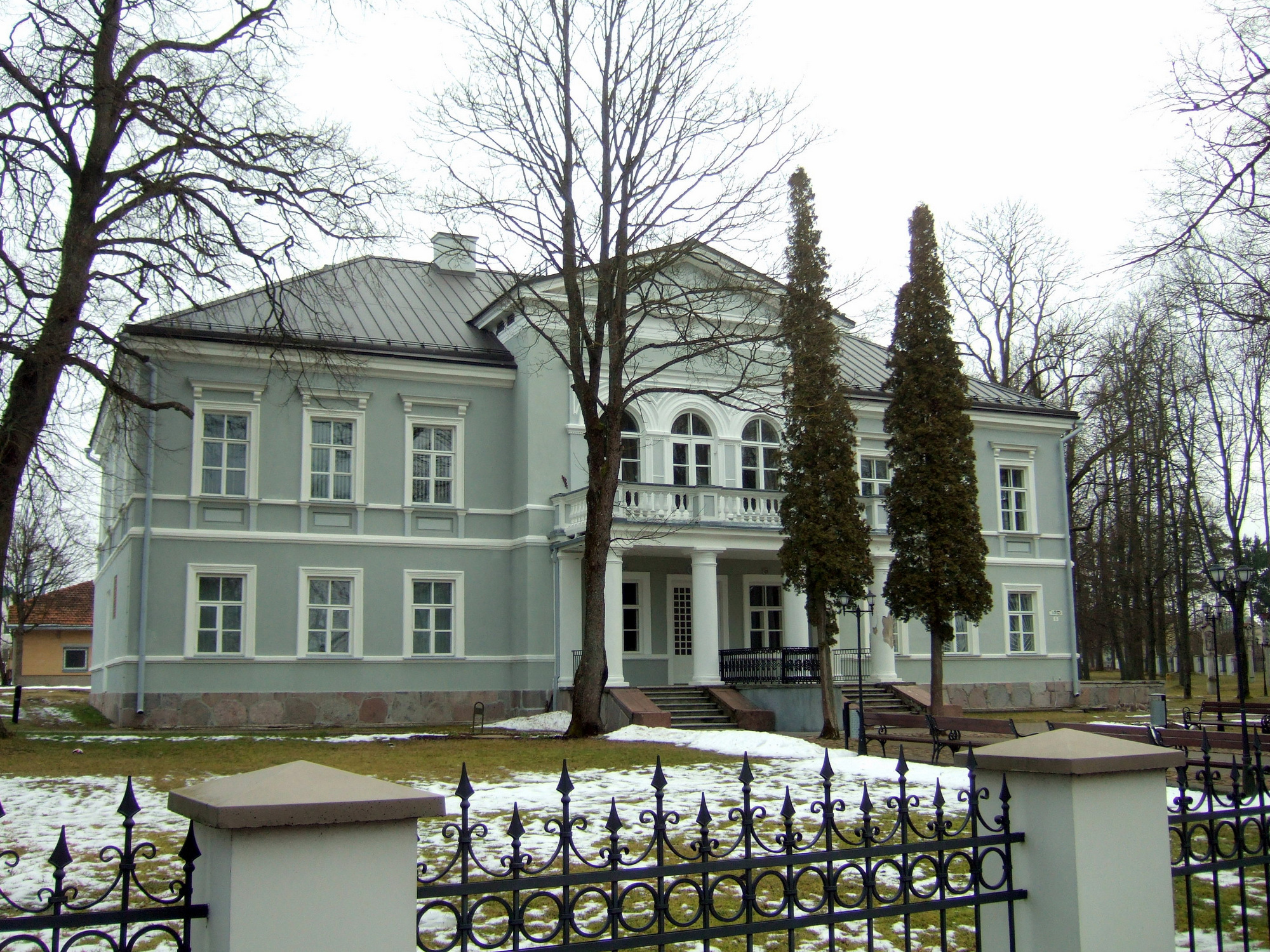
- Šalčininkai Manor in 2015

General information
- Architectural style: Historicism
- Location: Šalčininkai, Vilnius County
- Country: Lithuania
- Year(s) built: 14th century
- Owner: Stanislav Moniuszko School of Arts

Šalčininkai Manor is a former Vagneriai residential manor in Šalčininkai city, Šalčininkai District Municipality, Lithuania.
