= Antalina Manor =

Coordinates: 55°41′17″N 24°51′48″E

- Interactive map of the Antalina Manor area

General information
- Type: Residential manor
- Location: Antalina, Lithuania

Antalina Manor is a former residential manor in Antalina village, Anykščiai district.
