= Bikuškis Manor =

Coordinates: 55°36′19″N 25°41′31″E

- Interactive map of the Bikuškis Manor area

General information
- Type: Residential manor
- Location: Sudeikiai, Lithuania

Bikuškis Manor is a former residential manor near Sudeikiai, Utena district.
