= Arnionys Manor =

Coordinates: 55°2′57″N 25°42′58″E

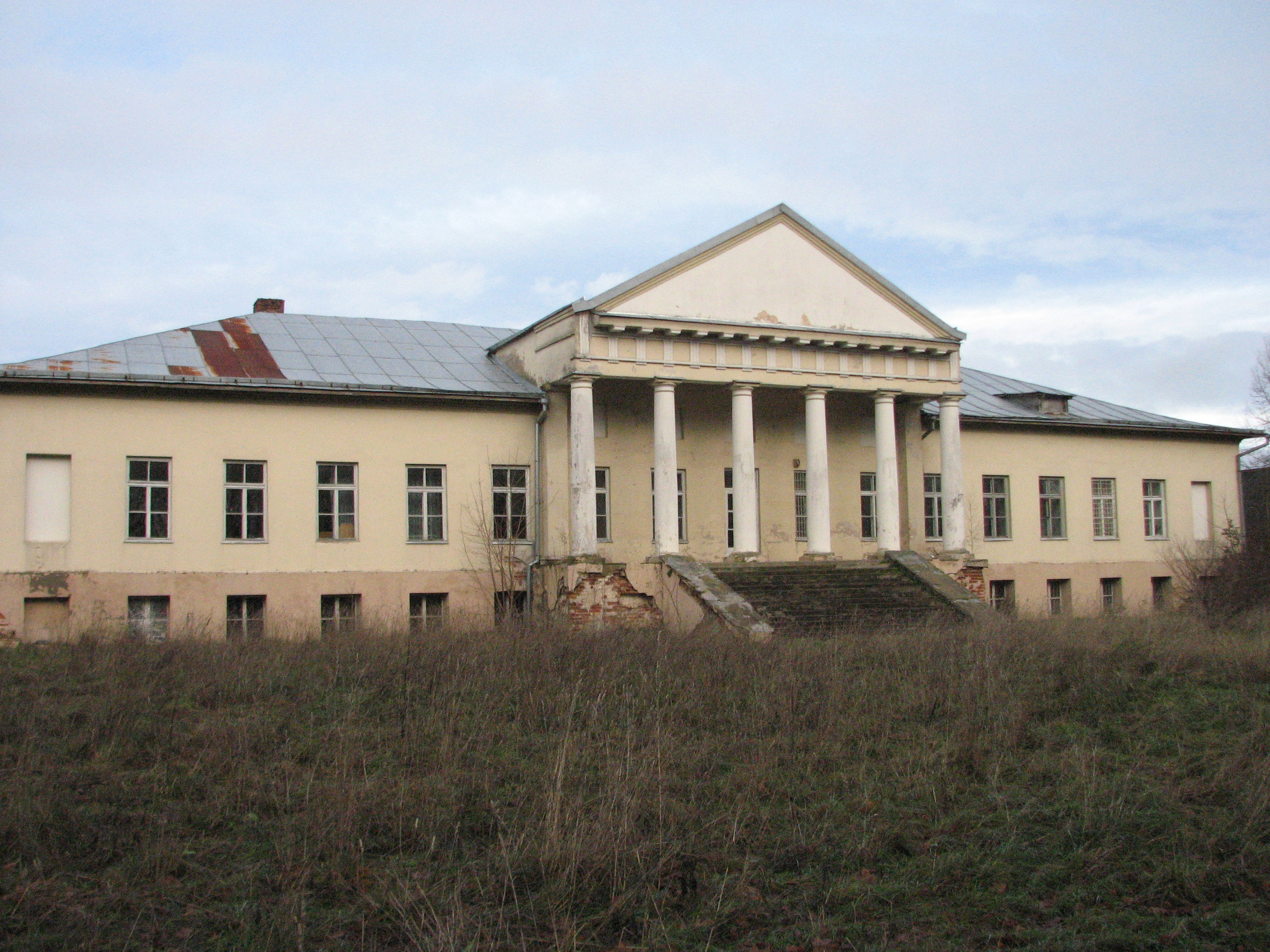
- Arnionys Manor (under reconstruction), 2007
- Interactive map of the Arnionys Manor area

General information
- Type: Residential manor
- Location: Arnionys, Lithuania

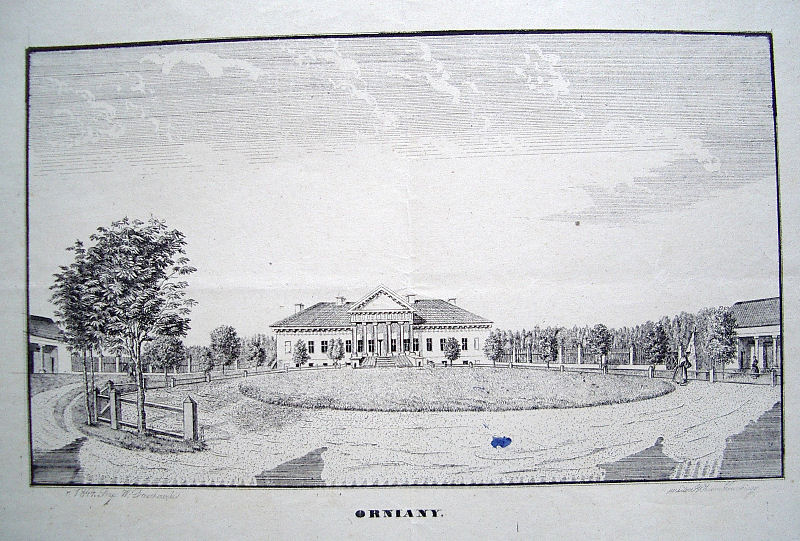
Arnionys Manor (1848)

Arnionys Manor is a residential manor in Molėtai district, Arnionys village.
