= Šumskas Manor =

Coordinates: 54°35′37″N 25°43′14″E

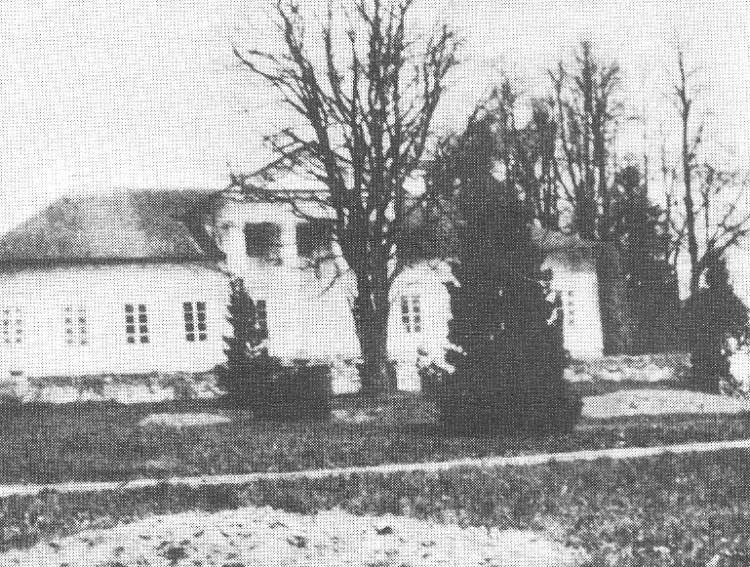
Šumskas Manor (1914)

Šumskas Manor is a former residential manor in Šumskas, Vilnius District Municipality, Lithuania.
