= Paežeriai Manor (Šiauliai) =

Coordinates: 55°56′59″N 22°48′10″E

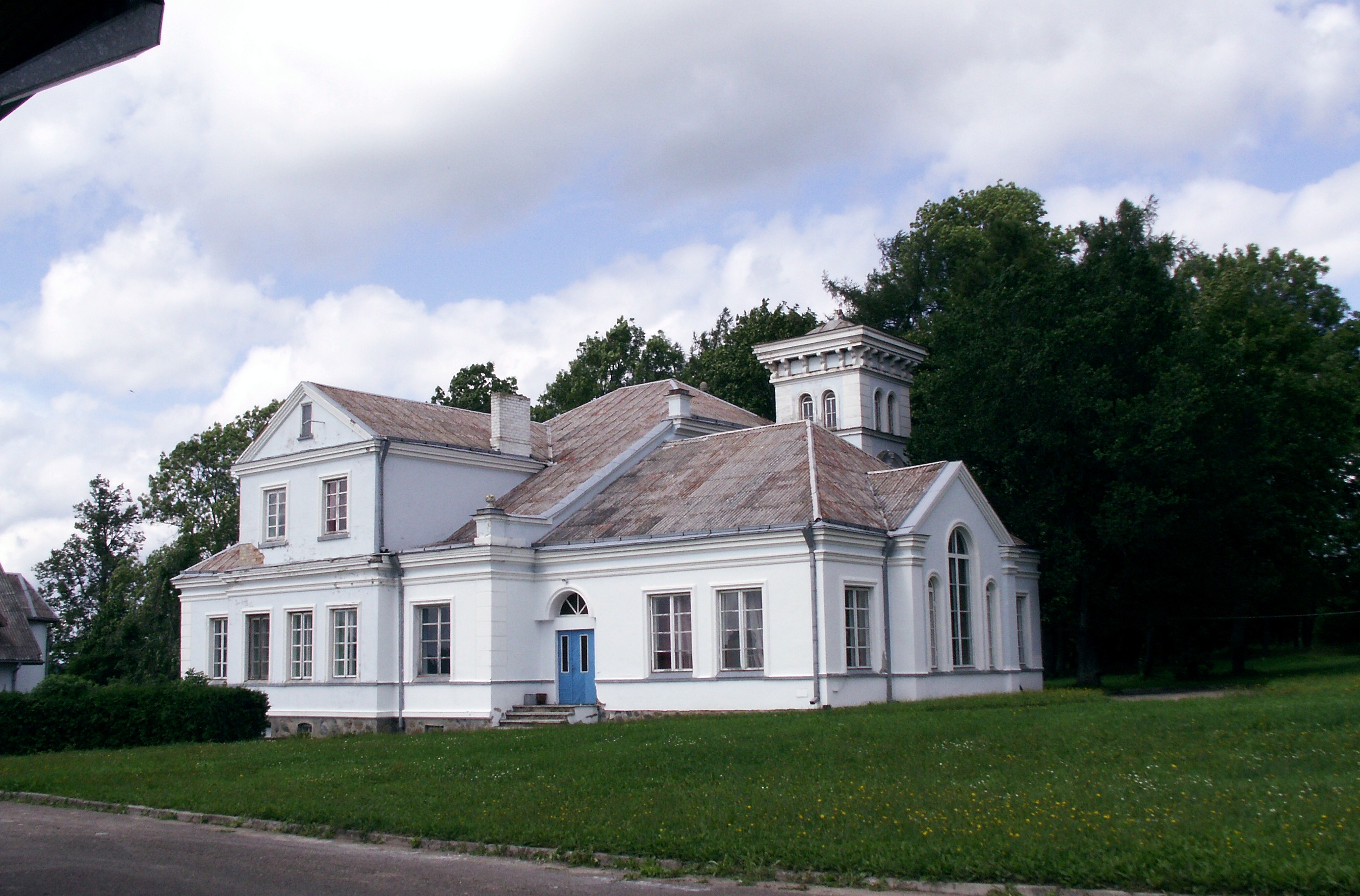
Paežeriai Manor

Paežeriai Manor is a former residential manor in Paežeriai village, Šiauliai District Municipality, near Nelinda lake.
