= Salamiestis Manor =

Manor house in Lithuania

Coordinates: 55°56′26″N 24°52′32″E

Grain warehouse (1930)

Salamiestis Manor is a former residential manor in Salamiestis, Kupiškis District Municipality, Lithuania. Salamiestis Manor is famous for its former grain warehouse, built by peasants, which did not survive into today. However, the main manor building remains and is in need of renovation.
