= Marcin Knackfus =

Polish–Lithuanian architect, professor and military captain

- Born: c. 1740; Wólka Ostrożeńska, Polish–Lithuanian Commonwealth
- Died: c. 1821; Vilnius, Russian Empire
- Other names: Martynas Knakfusas
- Occupation: Architect
- Known for: Introducing Neoclassical architecture to Lithuania

Marcin Knackfus (Lithuanian: Martynas Knakfusas; c. 1740 – c. 1821), was an architect, professor, and military captain from the Polish–Lithuanian Commonwealth.

He was first person to introduce Neoclassical architecture in Lithuania. He designed several important buildings in Vilnius, the capital and largest city of Lithuania.

== Biography ==
Marcin Knackfus was born c. 1740 in Wólka Ostrożeńska, Kingdom of Poland, near the city of Garwolin. His date of birth is not known but is estimated based on the assumption that he was around 25 years old in 1767 when his first child was born and when he joined the Grand Ducal Lithuanian Army as construction engineer. He held the rank of captain. Knackfus first moved to Vilnius around 1768.

Knackfus studied architecture in Warsaw and was influenced by other local architects of late Baroque (Ephraim Schröger and Szymon Bogumił Zug) and early Neoclassicism (Domenico Merlini and Johann Christian Kammsetzer). Knackfus taught at the Lithuanian Engineering Corps military school from 1769 until 1773 before becoming the first professor of architecture at Vilnius University until 1777.

In April 1771, Bishop of Vilnius Ignacy Jakub Massalski ordered Knackfus to survey a corner of the Vilnius Cathedral that had been damaged after a front tower of the cathedral collapsed in 1769. He drew up blueprints of the reconstruction, and after five reconstruction attempts, the cathedral was rebuilt in 1777 under the supervision of Polish-Lithuanian architect and former student of Knackfus, Laurynas Gucevičius.

In 1773, Knackfus became an architect of the Commission of National Education and prepared projects for schools. From 1788 on, Knackfus mostly designed reconstruction projects for the city of Vilnius as well as residences for Lithuanian nobles. These include the homes of Heinrich de Reuss LXIII, the Łopaciński family, Andrzej Abramowicz, and Antoni Tyzenhaus. Knackfus worked with numerous nobles, including Vilnius bishops Ignacy Jakub Massalski and Ignacy Krasicki, Field Hetman Ludwik Tyszkiewicz, voivode Karol Stanisław Radziwiłł, Adam Kazimierz Czartoryski, and Grand Marshal Stanisław Lubomirski.

== Personal life ==
Knackfus married Agnieszka Pawłowska in 1767. They had two children, Joachim and Katarzyna.

Knackfus was a freemason and was a member of three Masonic lodges in Vilnius. Through his masonic connections, he became a supporter of Tadeusz Kościuszko and the 1794 Kościuszko Uprising. Upon the failure of the uprising, Russian forces stormed Vilnius and burnt down many buildings in the Sereikiškės area of Vilnius where Knackfus lived. Fearing retribution for his involvement, Knackfus moved to the Suwałki Region on the Lithuania–Poland border.

He died in Vilnius c. 1821.

== Works ==
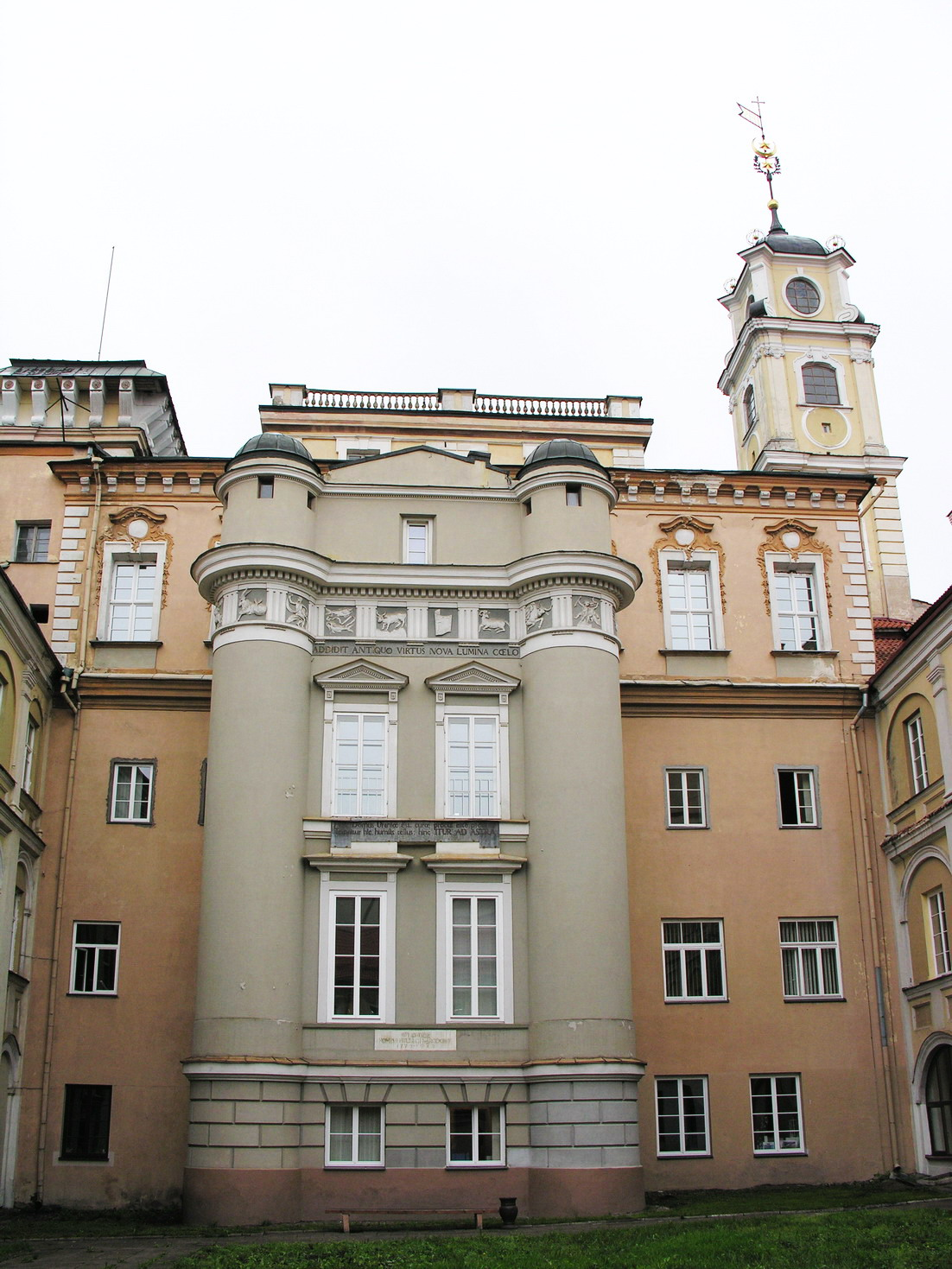
Vilnius University Observatory, one of the best examples of early Neoclassicism in Lithuan

- Verkiai Palace in Verkiai, Vilnius (1769–1781)
- Late Baroque Church of the Holy Trinity in Troškūnai (1774–1787)
- Šuazeliai Palace, home of Heinrich de Reuss LXIII, prince of the House of Reuss, at Liejyklos Street, Daukantas Square, Vilnius Old Town (1775)
- An expansion of Vilnius University Astronomical Observatory in Vilnius Old Town (1782–1788)
- Vilnius Botanical Garden in Antakalnis (1784)
- Late Baroque Church of St. Jacob in Kurtuvėnai (1783–1792)
- Altar in the Church of All Saints in Vilnius (1787)
- Project for the New Arsenal at the Vilnius Castle Complex
- St. Bartholomew Church in Užupis, Vilnius (1788)
- Supervised the construction of the Green Bridge in Vilnius (1789)
- Renovations to the Church of the Visitation of the Blessed Virgin Mary in Trakai (1789–1790)
- Abramavičiai Palace, home of Andrzej Abramowicz, Polish castellan and nobleman (present-day Vilnius Conservatory of Juozas Tallat-Kelpša), Vilnius (1790)
- Tyzenhaus Palace, home of Antoni Tyzenhaus, Major General of the Grand Duchy of Lithuania, at Trakų Street in Vilnius Old Town (around 1790)
- Archives of the Lithuanian Tribunal in Vilnius (1790)
- Łopaciński Palace, home of the wealthy Łopaciński family at Skapo Streer in Vilnius Old Town (1791)
- Manor and park in Paežeriai, Vilkaviškis District (1794)
- Parish school in Troškūnai, Utena County (1796)
- Designed layout of Basanavičius street in Vilnius (1798)

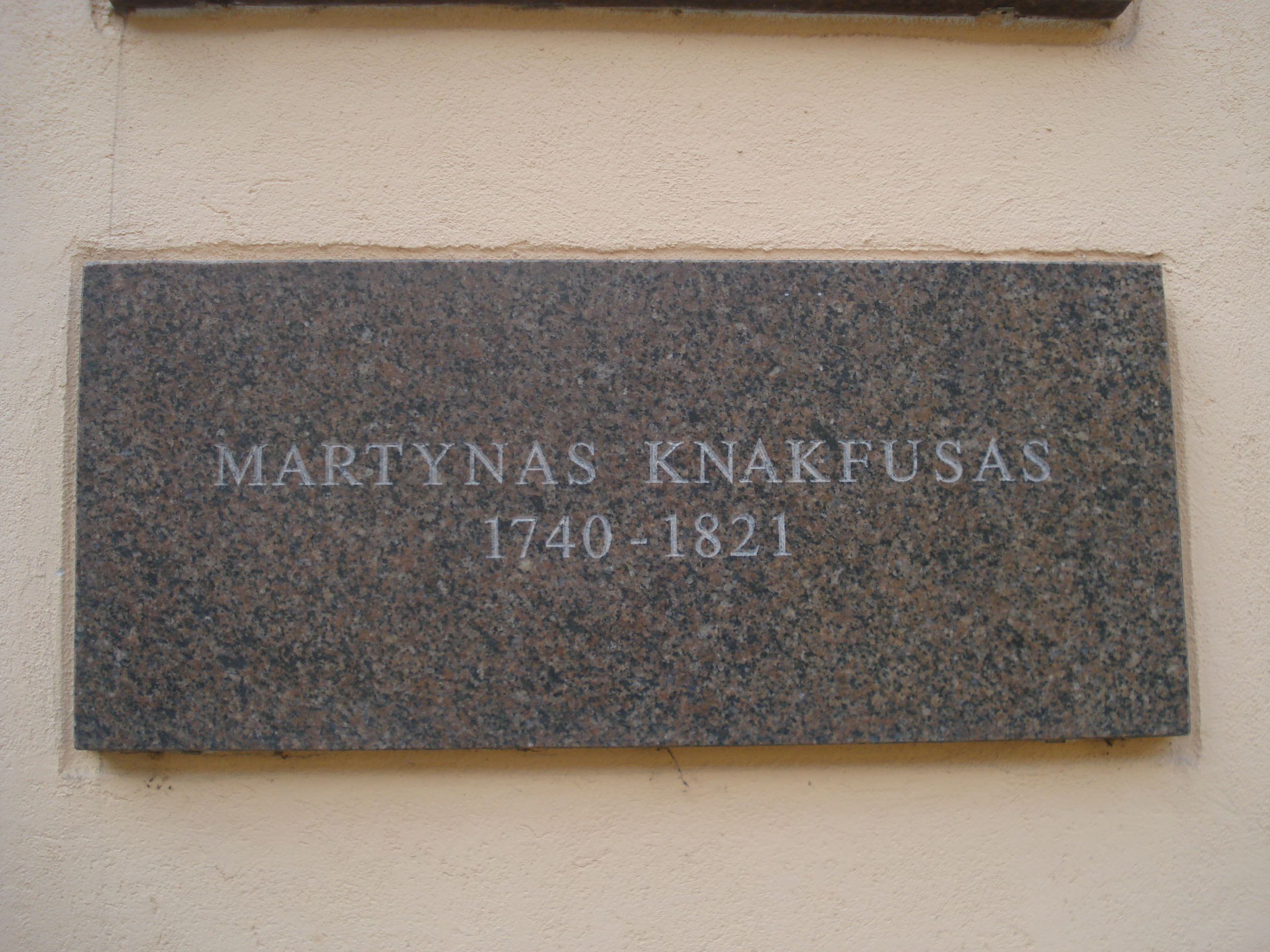
Marcin Knackfus's plaque at Vilnius Academy of Arts

== Bibliography ==
- Etin, Gal (2021). Klasicizmo architektų atminimo įamžinimas Lietuvoje (Thesis) (in Lithuanian). Vytautas Magnus University.
- Čerbulėnas, Klemensas (1986). "Knakfusas, Martynas". In Jonas Zinkus; et al. (eds.). Tarybų Lietuvos enciklopedija. Vol. 2. Vilnius: Vyriausioji enciklopedijų redakcija. LCCN 86232954. (in Lithuanian)
- Čerbulėnas, Klemensas (1994). Lietuvos architektūros istorija: Nuo XVII a. pradžios iki XIX a. vidurio (in Lithuanian). Vol. II. Vilnius: Mokslo ir enciklopedijų leidykla. ISBN 5-420-00583-2.
- Drėma, Vladas (1991). Dingęs Vilnius (in Lithuanian). Vilnius: Vaga. ISBN 5-415-00366-5.
- Klimka, Libertas (2003). "Overview of the History of Vilnius University Observatory". Baltic Astronomy. 12 (4): 649. Bibcode:2003BaltA..12..649K. doi:10.1515/astro-2017-00101. ISSN 1392-0049. S2CID 140171682.
