= De Reus Palace =

- De Reusų rūmai
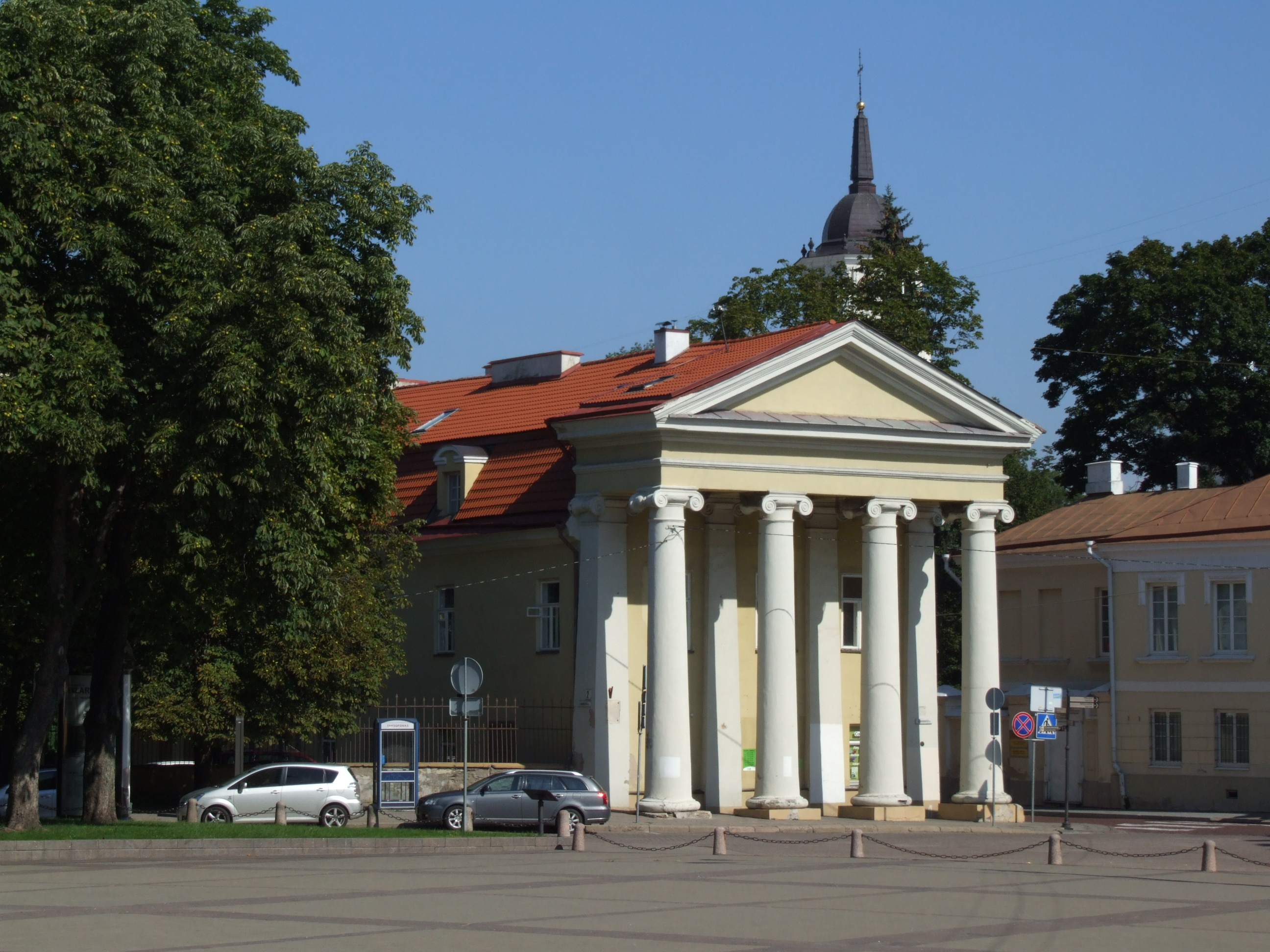
- Main façade facing Daukantas Square
- Alternative names: Choiseul Palace

General information
- Architectural style: Baroque, Neoclassical
- Location: S. Daukanto Square 2 / Universiteto Street 10, Vilnius, Lithuania
- Coordinates: 54°41′03″N 25°17′11″E
- Completed: Mid-18th century
- Renovated: 1786

Design and construction
- Architect: Marcin Knackfus (reconstruction)

De Reus Palace (Lithuanian: De Reusų rūmai), also known as Choiseul Palace (Lithuanian: Šuazelių rūmai; Polish: pałac de Choiseulów), is a historic palace in the Old Town of Vilnius, Lithuania. Located at the intersection of Daukantas Square and Universiteto Street, opposite the Presidential Palace, it is one of the city's notable examples of Neoclassical architecture. Its principal façade is distinguished by a monumental four-column Ionic portico surmounted by a triangular pediment. The building is protected as a cultural heritage monument of national importance.

The palace developed from a two-storey residence constructed in the mid-18th century by Jonas Teofilis Krempušas and his wife Teresa. It was extensively remodelled in 1786, most likely by Marcin Knackfus. In the early 19th century, the property belonged to the French aristocratic Choiseul family. It subsequently passed to the Pomarnacki family, before being purchased in 1849 by Antonina de Reus. Later owners included the Plater family. During the 20th century, the palace was subdivided into apartments, and it continues to accommodate residential and commercial premises.
