= Lopacinskiai Palace =

Lopacinskiai Palace may refer to:

- Lopacinskiai Palace (Bernardinų st.)
- Lopacinskiai Palace (Skapo st.)
