= Stefan Narębski =

Polish architect (1892–1966)

Stefan Narębski (January 23, 1892 – November 16, 1966) was a Polish architect and artist, as well as a noted art conservator and restorer.

He was born in Grozny, then in Imperial Russia, where his father had followed a career of a physician. Early in Narębski's childhood the family moved to Vilnius, where he graduated from one of the local schools and continued his education at the Institute for Civilian Engineers in St. Petersburg and then at the Warsaw University of Technology. Between 1927 and 1928 he was appointed the municipal architect of the town of Włocławek. In the following years he held the same post in the city of Vilnius, where - among his other projects - he restored the Archbishop's Palace. He was also a professor at the Stefan Batory University. After the war he was expelled to Poland, where he settled in Toruń. There he helped creating the Fine Arts Division of the Nicolaus Copernicus University. Since 1946 he served as its dean.
