= Troškūnai =

- City
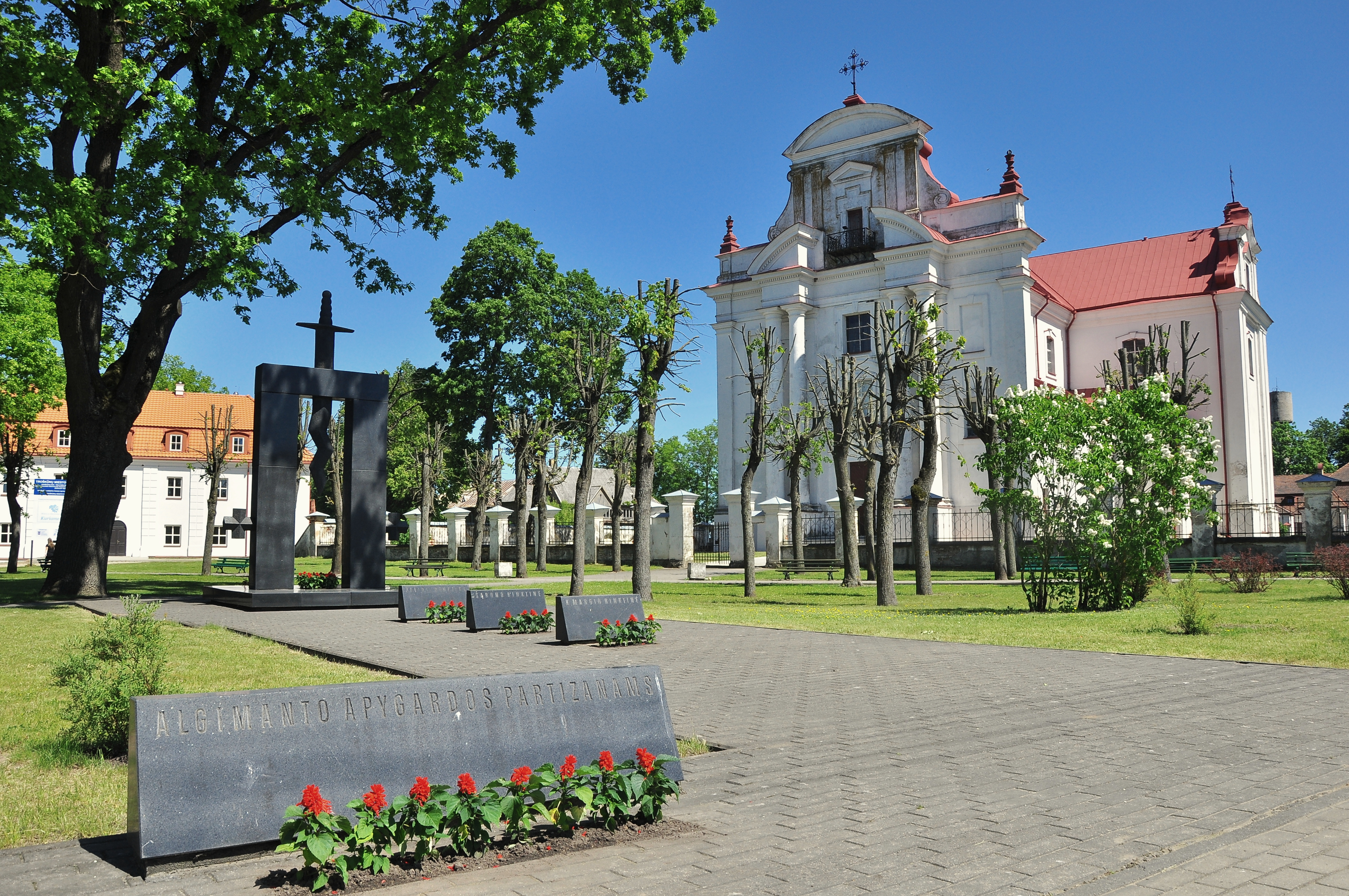
- Troškūnai, Lithuania - panoramio Centre of Troškūnai

- Coat of arms

- Location of Troškūnai
- Coordinates: 55°35′10″N 24°52′10″E
- Country: Lithuania
- Ethnographic region: Aukštaitija
- County: Utena County
- Municipality: Anykščiai district municipality
- Eldesrhip: Troškūnai eldership
- Capital of: Troškūnai eldership
- First mentioned: 1696
- Granted city rights: 1956

Population (2021)
  - Total: 378
- Time zone: UTC+2 (EET)
  - Summer (DST): UTC+3 (EEST)

Troškūnai is the second smallest city in Lithuania, with a population of only 378. It is located 14 km (8.7 mi) west from Anykščiai.

== Etymology ==
From the end of the 17th century to the end of the 18th century, the town was officially called Vladislavovas (in the 17th century the town belonged to the landlord Vladislovas Sakalauskas), but the names Troškūnai and Traškūnai has been used at the same time, it is likely a personal place name derived from the surname Troškūnas. Although the surname is extremely rare, there are surnames Troška, Troškauskas, and Troškūnas may have been a derivative of the patronymic suffix "-ūnas" from the surname Troška. In the interwar period, the normative form of the place name was Traškūnai, a form of the place name with an "a" in the stem, which has been mentioned since the 16th century. In other languages the town is known as: Polish: Traszkuny.

The folk etymology suggests that the name may have been inspired by the swampy forest near the town, which was set on fire by lightning strike, but because of the high humidity, it did not burn as much as it smoked. As the Lithuanian word "trošku" means smothery, smoggy, stuffy.

== History ==
Troškūnai first mentioned in historical sources in 1506, the estate of Troškūnai (or estate of Smėlynė) existed in 16th century. Troškūnai became a town in the 17th-18th centuries when the church of St Trinity Church and Bernardine Monastery in the style of late baroque according to the project of the architect Martin Knakfus were built. In 1698 Troškūnai got a privilege to organise markets. The Bernardine monastery became an important center of cultural life. The monks were active in resistance against the Russian tsarist regime.

In 1773 the school in which children of noblemen, town dwellers and local peasants were educated. In 1781 20 children from peasant families, 4 children from Troškūnai and 8 children from nobleman families attended lessons. The building of the school (1796) survives up to this day.

The birthplace of Lithuanian lexicographer and writer Konstantinas Sirvydas is nearby the town. The town was established in 1696 by Władysław Sokołowski, who brought there Bernardines, founded a church and a monastery. Recently the buildings were returned to the Bernardine monks, who established the International Centre of Youth there.

On 22 November in 1920 during Lithuanian Wars of Independence in fight against Polish cavalry, perished Lithuanian riflemen Jonas Budrevičius (1900–1920), Petras Liktoras (1903–1920), Antanas Miškeliūnas (1901–1920), Petras Tunkevičius (1902–1920), Antanas Žarskus (1895–1920).

On July 10, 1941, by the orders of Nazi occupation authorities local Lithuanian collaborators killed 8 or 9 Jewish men on the premises of the local school. In mid-July 1941 5-6 Jewish men were shot at the Jewish cemetery by Troškūnai members of the Lithuanian Activist Front. In August, 1941, the remaining Jews of Troškūnai (about 200 people) were transported by white armbanders to the Panevėžys ghetto. There on August 23, 1941, they were murdered along with Jews from the town of Panevėžys and its surrounding areas in a mass execution.

After the Soviet occupation in the surroundings of Troškūnai Lithuanian partisans of Algimantas military district Šarūnas detachment were active.

== Gallery ==
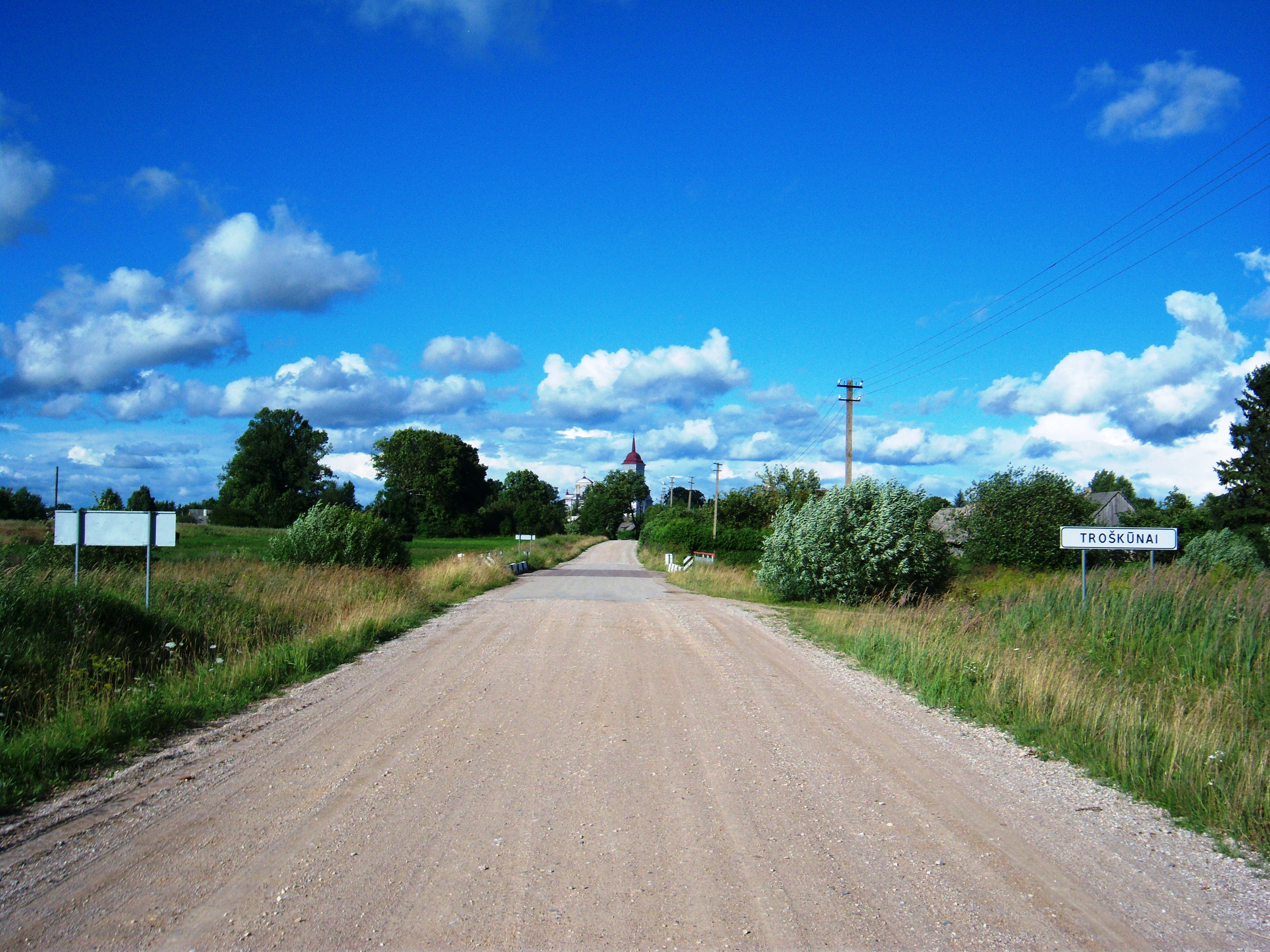
Entering from Traupis

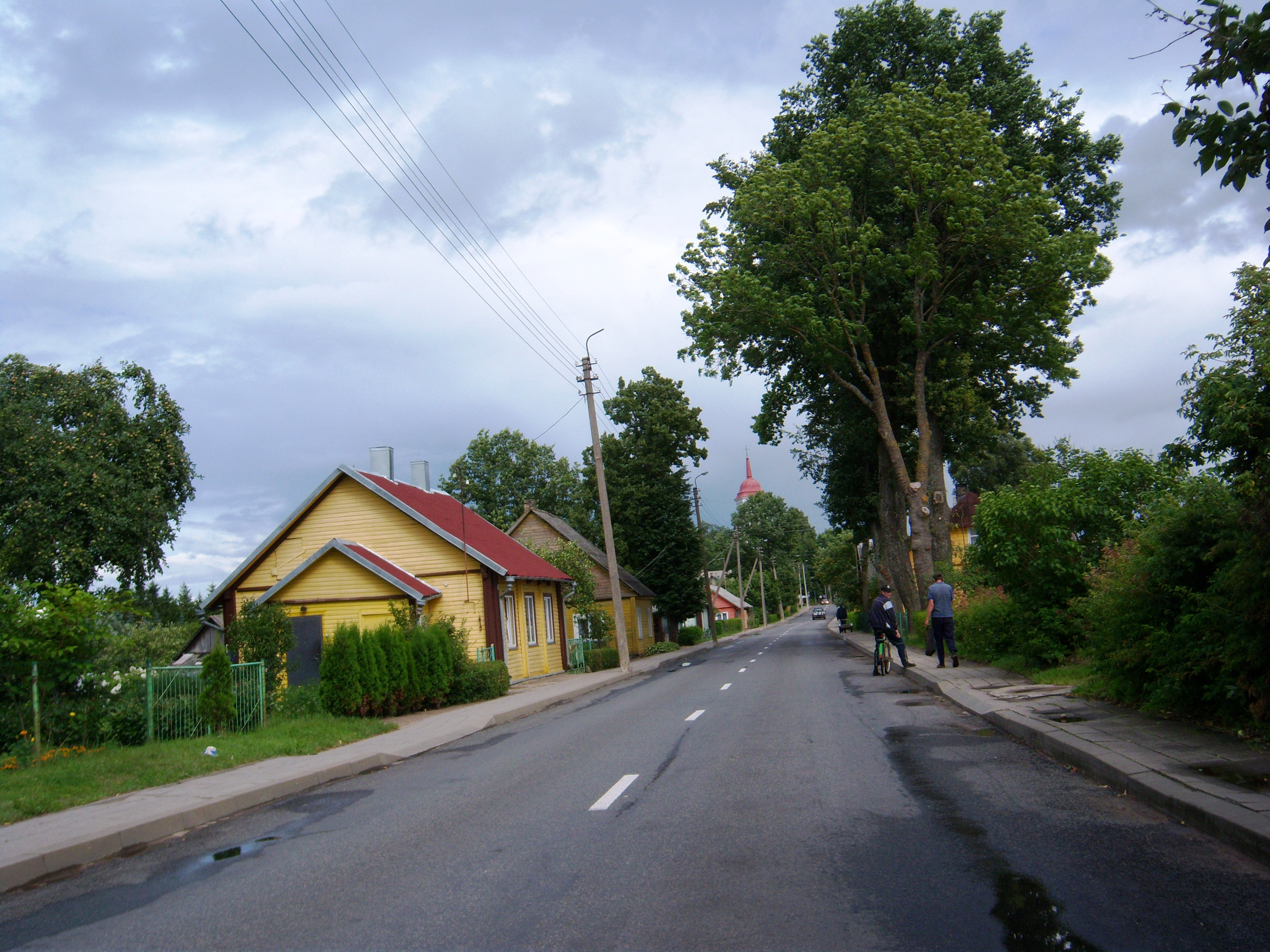
Entering from Vaidlonys

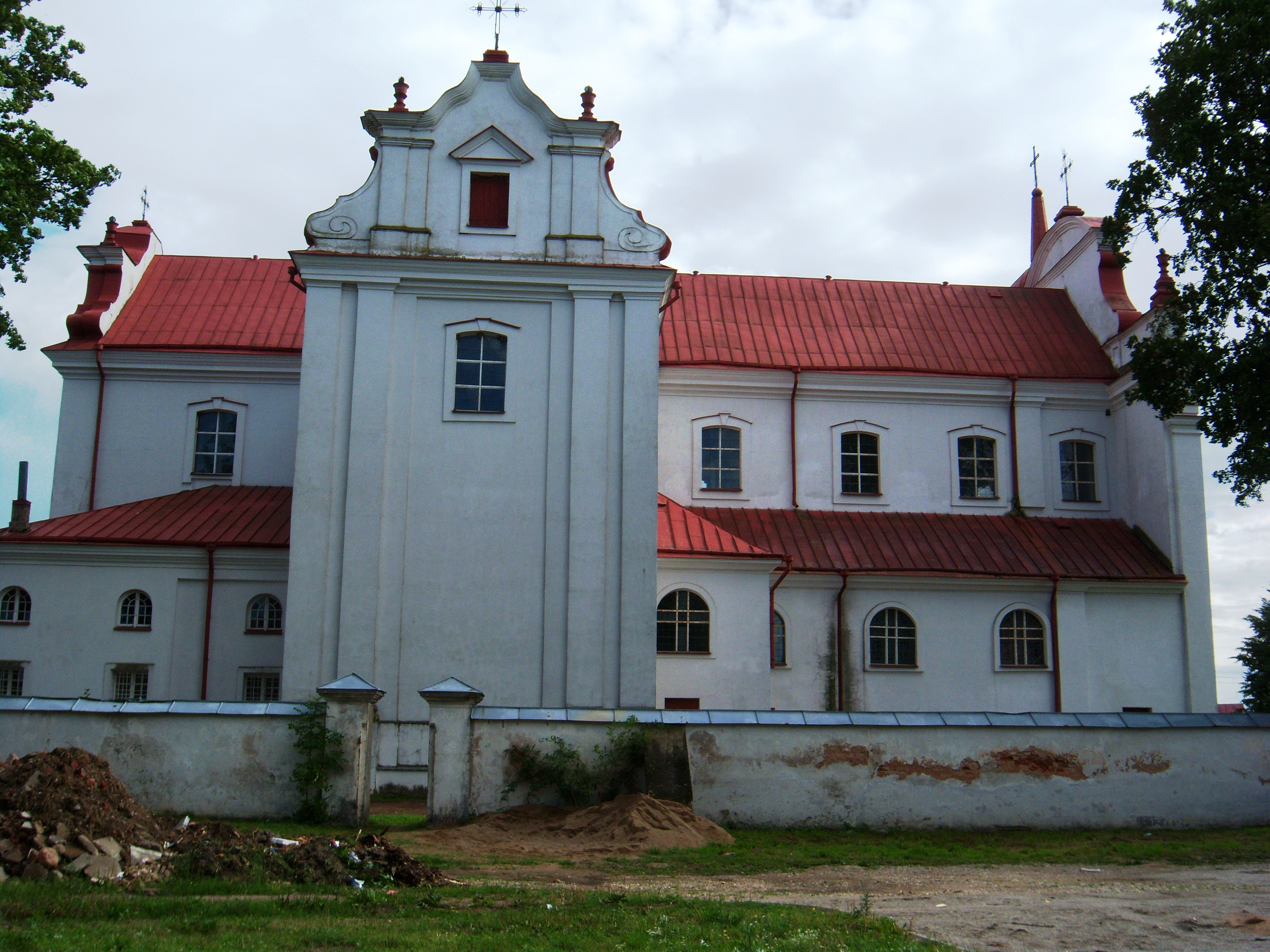
Church of the Holy Trinity

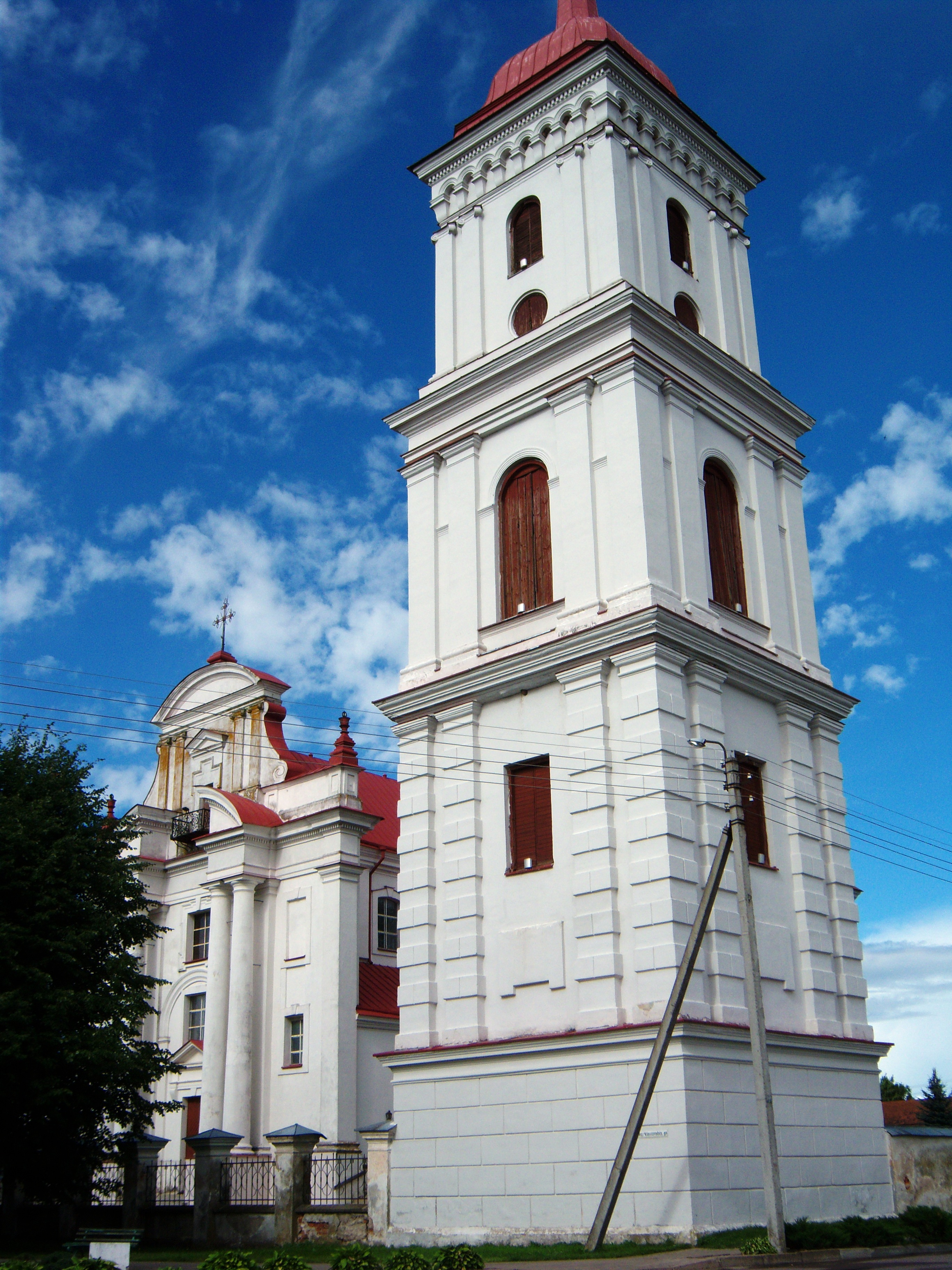
Church belfry

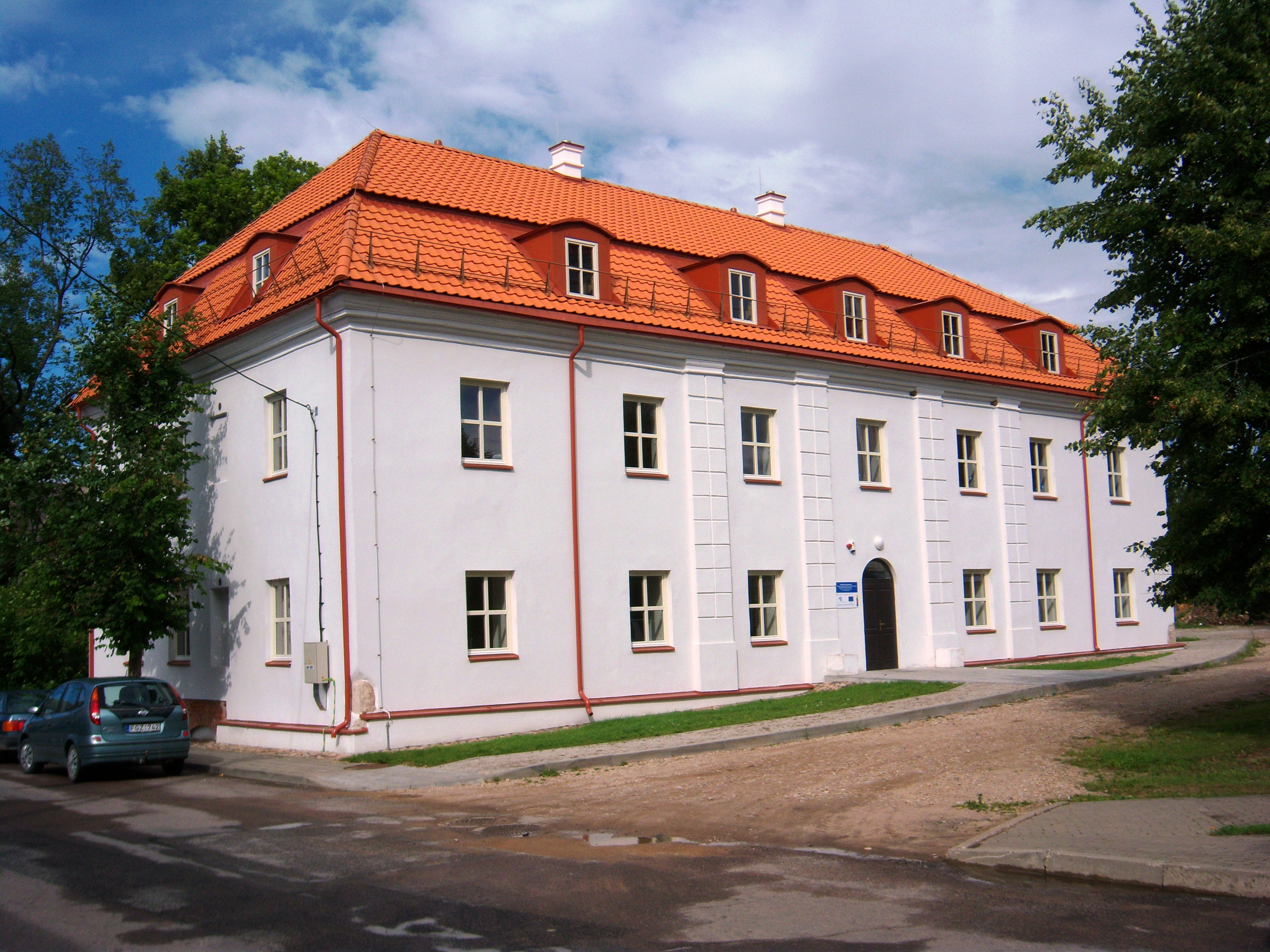
Cultural center

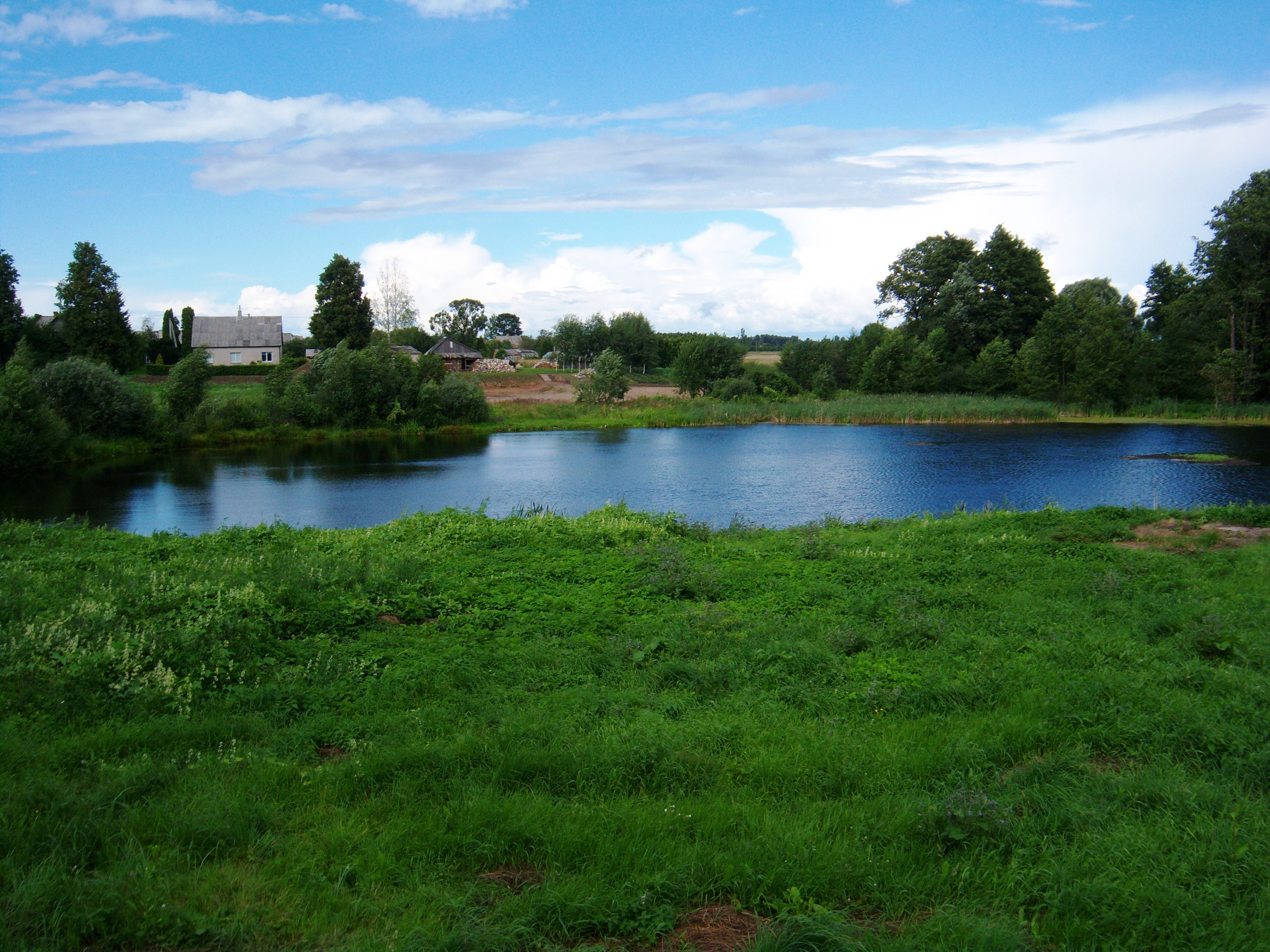
Pond behind the church

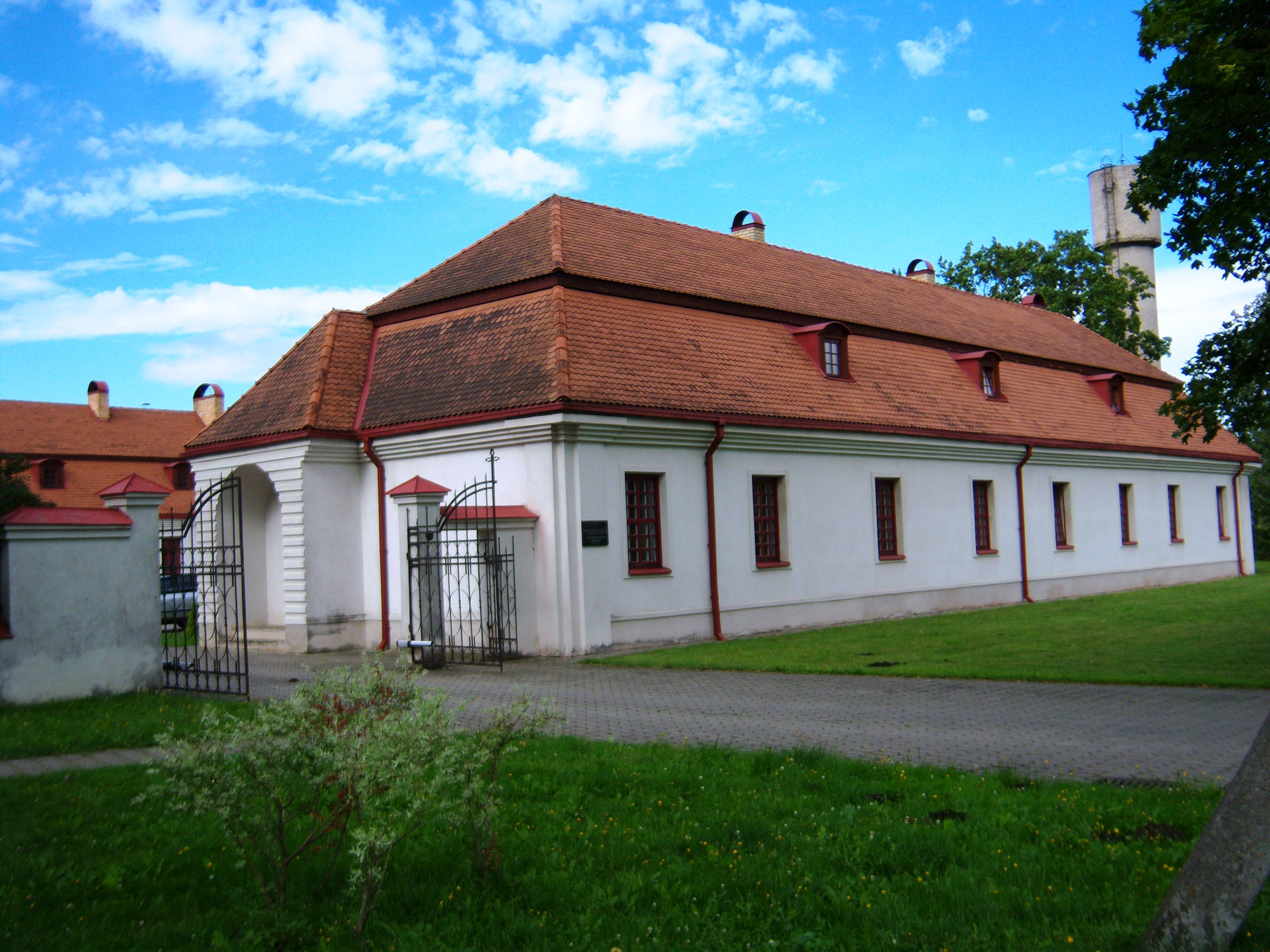
Monastery

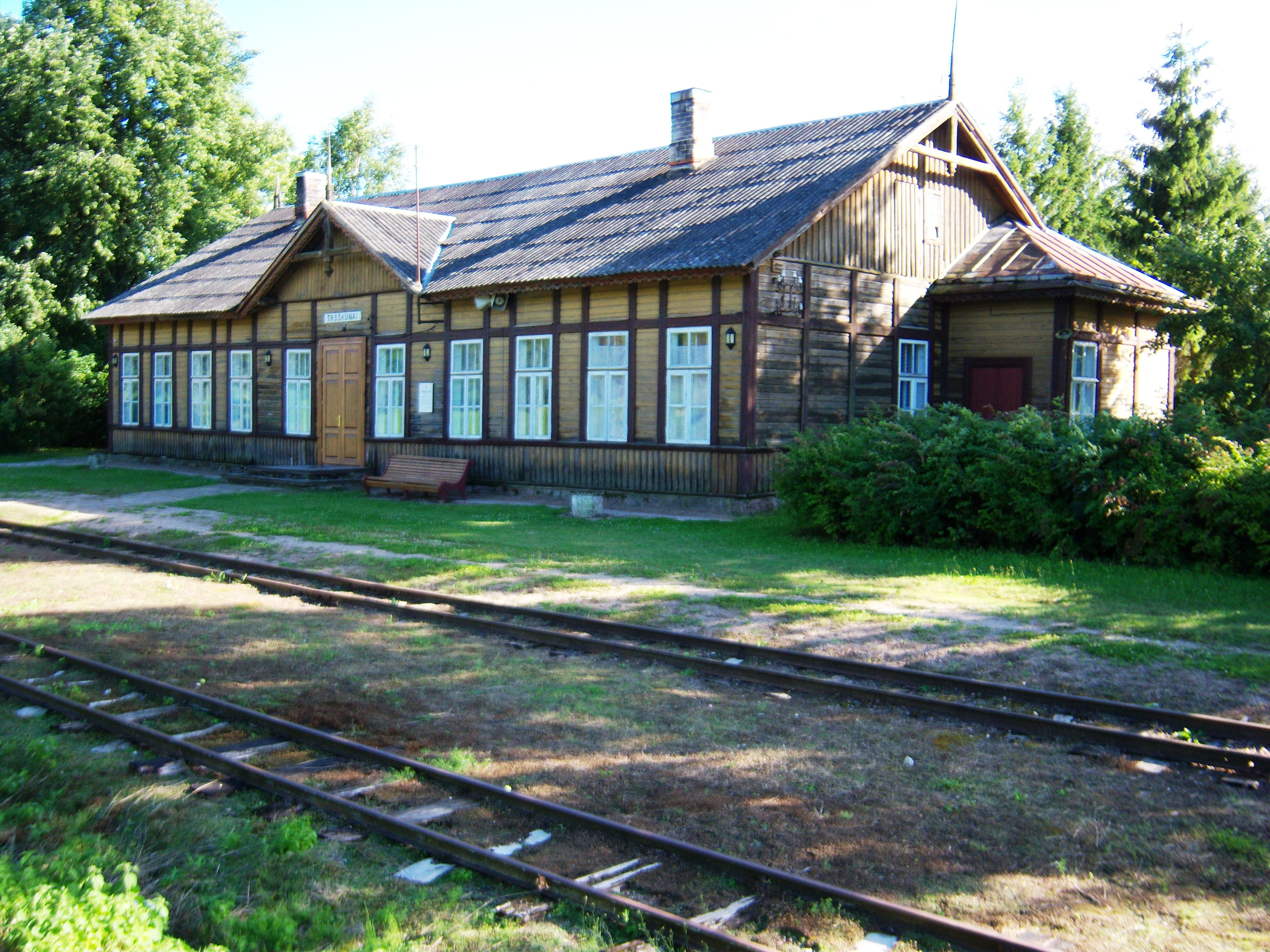
Railway Station
