= Lopacinskiai Palace (Skapo st.) =

Building in Vilnius, Lithuania

Coordinates: 54°41′03″N 25°17′13″E

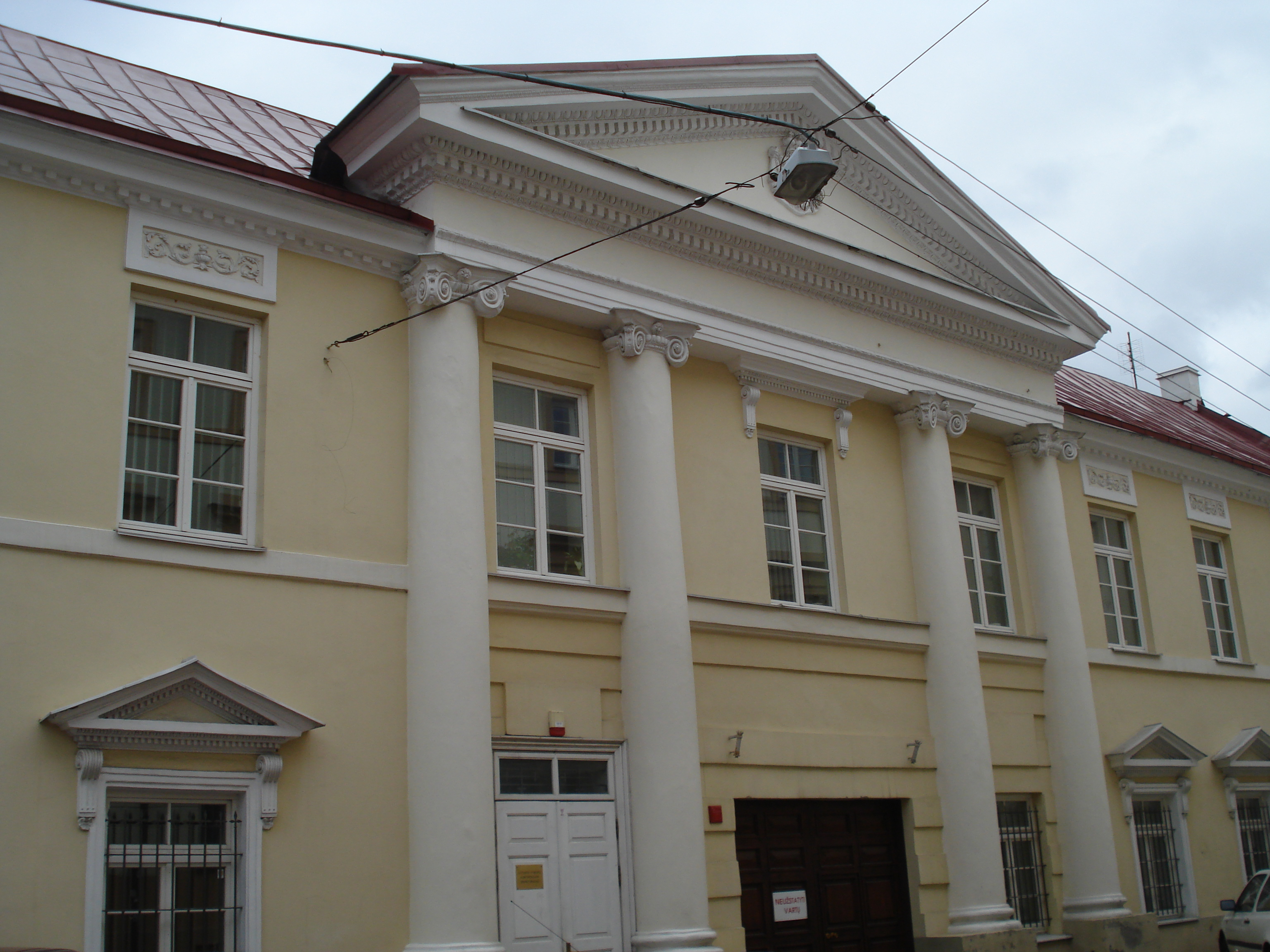
Łopacińskis (Sulistrowskis) Palace (Skapo st.)

Lopacinskiai Palace (Lithuanian: Lopacinskių rūmai, Polish: Pałac Łopacińskich) is a building in Vilnius Old Town, Skapo st (Skapo st. 4). Currently it is owned by the State Language Inspectorate and Vilnius Archdiocese Economy Council.

== History ==
The former masonry building dates back to 1545. The current palace was constructed between 1782 and 1854 by the Sulistrowskis with Marcin Knackfus as the architect.

From the 19th century, it was owned by the Łopacińskis.
