= Abramowicz Palace =

Palace in Vilnius, Lithuania

- Abramavičių rūmai
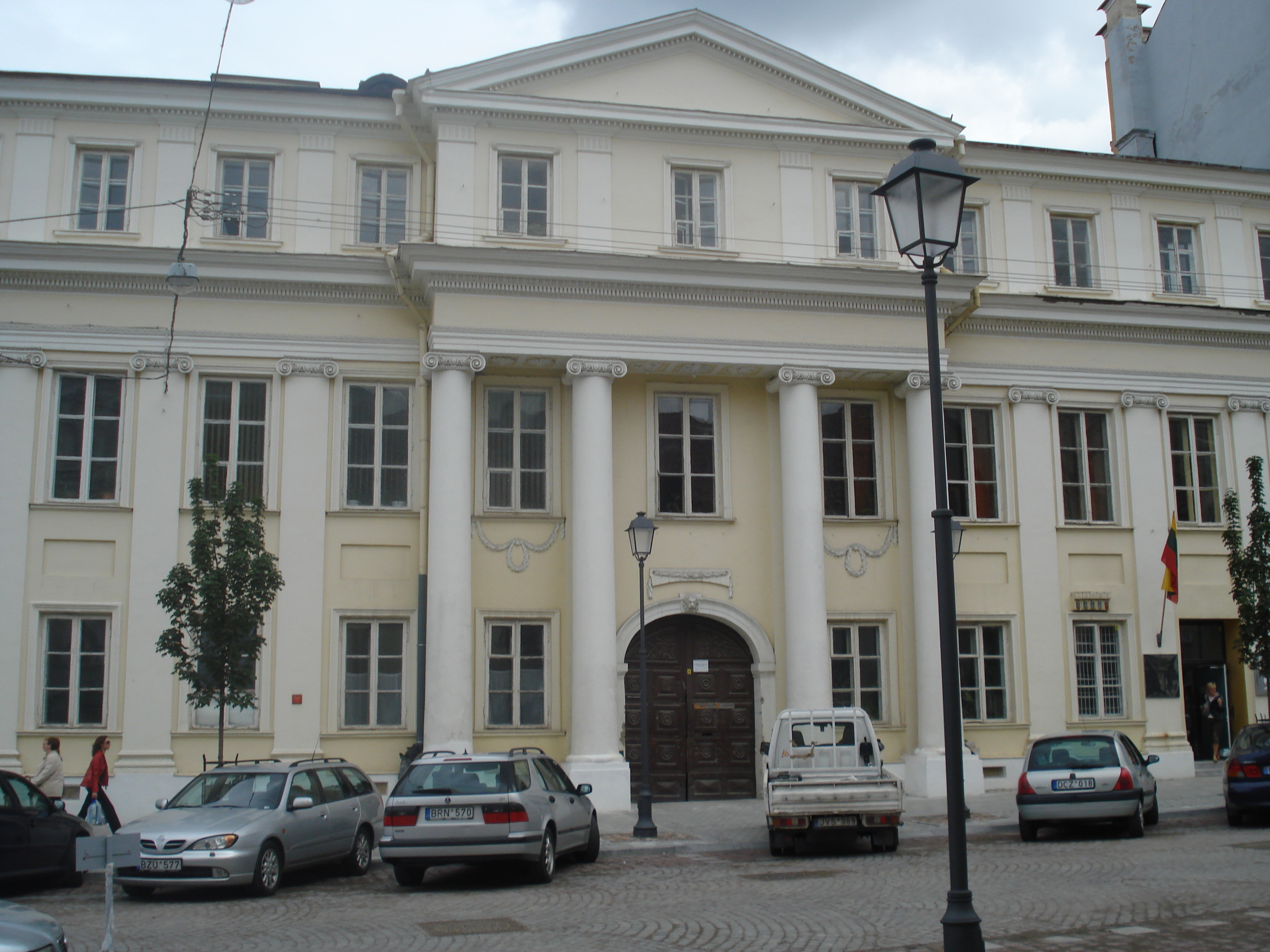
- Main façade of the palace

General information
- Architectural style: Baroque, Neoclassical
- Location: 36 Didžioji Street, Vilnius, Lithuania
- Coordinates: 54.6773°N 25.2881°E
- Construction started: 1783
- Renovated: 1801–1806; 1853–1860
- Owner: Society of Jesus (Lithuanian Province)

Design and construction
- Architect: Augustyn Kossakowski

Abramowicz Palace (Lithuanian: Abramavičių rūmai; Polish: pałac Abramowiczów) is a historic palace in the Old Town of Vilnius, Lithuania, located at 36 Didžioji Street, near Vilnius Town Hall. The building combines Baroque and Neoclassical architectural elements, with a monumental four-column portico dominating its main façade.

Originally occupied by two townhouses dating from at least the 17th century, the property was acquired by the Abramowicz family, who transformed it into an aristocratic residence in the late 18th century. The palace was designed by Augustyn Kossakowski and subsequently remodelled in the early 19th century. Following another major reconstruction in 1853–1860 under Tomasz Tyszecki, it served as the seat of the Vilnius Orthodox consistory. During the 20th century, the building was used by the Jesuits and later housed a music school and conservatory. It was returned to the Jesuits in 2011.

== History ==
Representative of the Abramowicz family, Andrzej, a Lithuanian Scribe and Castellan of Brest, purchased a property by the Vilnius market square in 1749, which included two tenement houses. It was inherited by his brother Jerzy, who died in 1767. His widow, Marcjanna née Dernałowicz, undertook the construction of a palace, demolishing the existing buildings and commencing the new palace's construction in 1783.

Architect Augustyn Kossakowski designed a two-story palace featuring an internal courtyard with a centrally aligned entrance gate. Between 1801 and 1806, Mikołaj Abramowicz initiated modernization efforts, focusing primarily on the palace's interiors, based on a design by Wawrzyniec Gucewicz. In 1814, Mikołaj Abramowicz sold the palace to Antoni Wańkowicz.

In 1844 the palace became the property of the Orthodox consistory clergy. In 1853-1860 it was rebuilt under the direction of Tomasz Tyszecki and connected with St. Casimir's Church, then an Orthodox church. In 1914-15 the palace was the seat of Vilnius Orthodox Archbishop Tikhon (Vasily Belavin). In the interwar period, the building belonged to the Jesuit Order. After World War II it was Juozas Tallat-Kelpša High School of Music, which later was transformed into conservatory. Currently it's owned by the Lithuanian Jesuit Province.

== Bibliography ==
- Czyż, Anna Sylwia (2021). Pałace Wilna XVII–XVIII wieku [Palaces of Vilnius 17th-18th centuries] (in Polish). Warsaw: Narodowy Instytut Polskiego Dziedzictwa Kulturowego za Granicą POLONIKA.
