= Łopaciński Palace (Bernardinų Street) =

Palace in Vilnius, Lithuania

- Lopacinskių rūmai
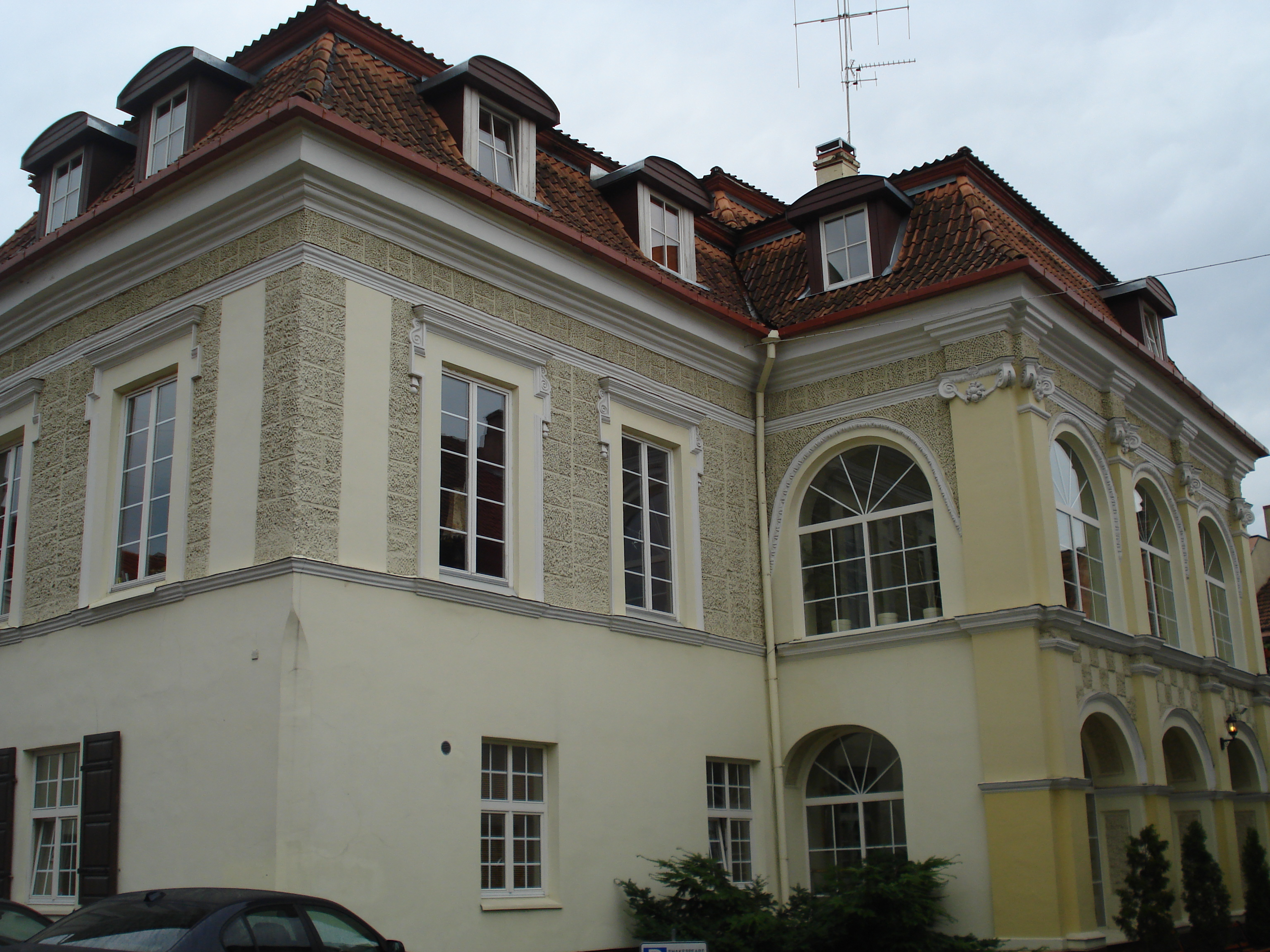
- Palace main façade
- Alternative names: Łopaciński-Olizar Palace

General information
- Type: Palace
- Architectural style: Classical Revival
- Location: Old town, Bernardinų st. 8, Vilnius, Lithuania
- Coordinates: 54°41′01″N 25°17′30″E
- Current tenants: Hotel Šekspyras
- Groundbreaking: 16th century
- Construction started: 1762
- Renovated: 1967-1975

Technical details
- Floor count: 2

Design and construction
- Architect: Johann Christoph Glaubitz
- Other designers: Aldona Svabauskienė

Łopaciński Palace or Łopaciński-Olizar Palace (Lithuanian: Lopacinskių-Olizarų rūmai) is a historic Late Baroque palace in the Old Town of Vilnius, Lithuania, located at 8 Bernardinų Street. Built on the site of earlier structures dating from the 16th and 17th centuries, the palace acquired its present architectural character during a major reconstruction commissioned by Mikołaj Tadeusz Łopaciński in the 1760s. The reconstruction was designed by Johann Christoph Glaubitz.

The palace was acquired by the Kossakowski family in 1801 and subsequently passed to the Olizar family around 1819. In 1828, it was purchased by Józef Zawadzki, whose family operated a publishing house and printing business on the premises until 1940. Following nationalisation during the Soviet period, the building accommodated publishing offices and underwent restoration between 1967 and 1975. It currently houses the Shakespeare Boutique Hotel.

== History ==
Extant reports indicate the existence of Gothic-style structures on the site of the present palace as early as the 16th century. In the first half of the 17th century, a small square brick house was constructed on the southern part of the present palace, near Bernardinų Street. Throughout the centuries, the palace has undergone numerous reconstructions and extensions.

In 1663-1664, the Skarbny of the Grand Duchy of Lithuania, Gabriel Karol Kimbar, engaged in legal proceedings against Adam Maciej Sakowicz, the Voivode of Smolensk, over ownership of the palace. In 1671, the legal proceedings were continued by the parties' descendants. The outcome of the court case is unknown, and at the beginning of the 18th century, the palace was owned by the Zenowicz family.

In 1748, the palace was damaged by fire, and it was not until 1762 that it was purchased by Starosta of Mstsislaw Voivodeship Mikołaj Tadeusz Łopaciński, who initiated a reconstruction project of the architect Johann Christoph Glaubitz. The building was reconstructed into a complex two-storey palace with a trapezoidal plan and a semi-enclosed courtyard.

In 1801, the palace was sold to the Kossakowski family. At that time, the palace had 27 rooms. In 1808, the buildings underwent reconstruction at the behest of Jan Nepomucen Kossakowski, Bishop of Vilnius, resulting in the palace being slightly curved according to the contour of the street and covered with a high, stepped roof.

Between 1819 and 1828, Olizar family owned the palace, and it is believed that during this period it served as a meeting place for Masonic lodge. Later it was acquired by the Zawadzki family, which frequently rented rooms in the palace, and in 1857, books and printing equipment were stored in a separate garden building, suggesting the presence of a printing house.

Between 1967 and 1975, the main building underwent partial reconstruction and adaptation for use as a publishing house, as outlined in the project by architect Aldona Svabauskienė. This publishing house operated within the building until 1985.

Currently the building houses the Shakespeare Boutique Hotel.
