= Andrzej Abramowicz =

Polish-Lithuanian nobleman

Andrzej Abramowicz (died 1763) was a Polish-Lithuanian nobleman. He was Castellan Lithuanian Brest (1757–1763) and Knight of the Order of the White Eagle (1761).
