= Daukanto Square =

Square in Vilnius, Lithuania

Coordinates: 54°41′1″N 25°17′10″E

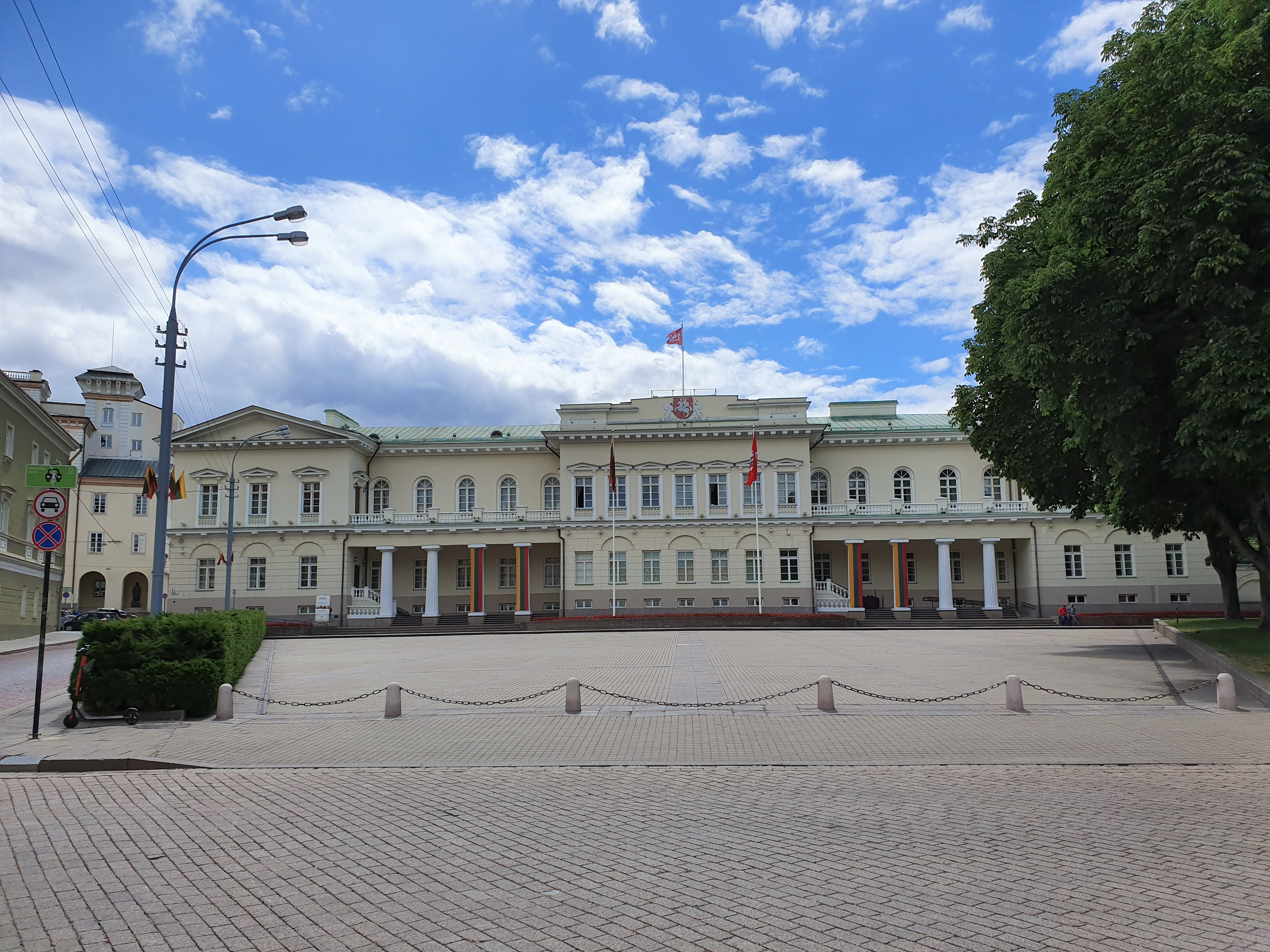
Daukanto Square in front of the Presidential Palace of the Republic of Lithuania

Daukantas Square in Vilnius, Lithuania is located in the Old Town, in front of the Presidential Palace. Its name commemorates a progenitor of the 19th-century Lithuanian national revival, Simonas Daukantas. In the late 19th century it had a monument of Mikhail Nikolayevich Muravyov-Vilensky.

The square hosts state ceremonies. It has also been the site of demonstrations and rallies.
