= Presidential Palace, Vilnius =

Official Palace of the President of Lithuania

Coordinates: 54.683°N 25.286°E

Prezidentūra Presidential Palace
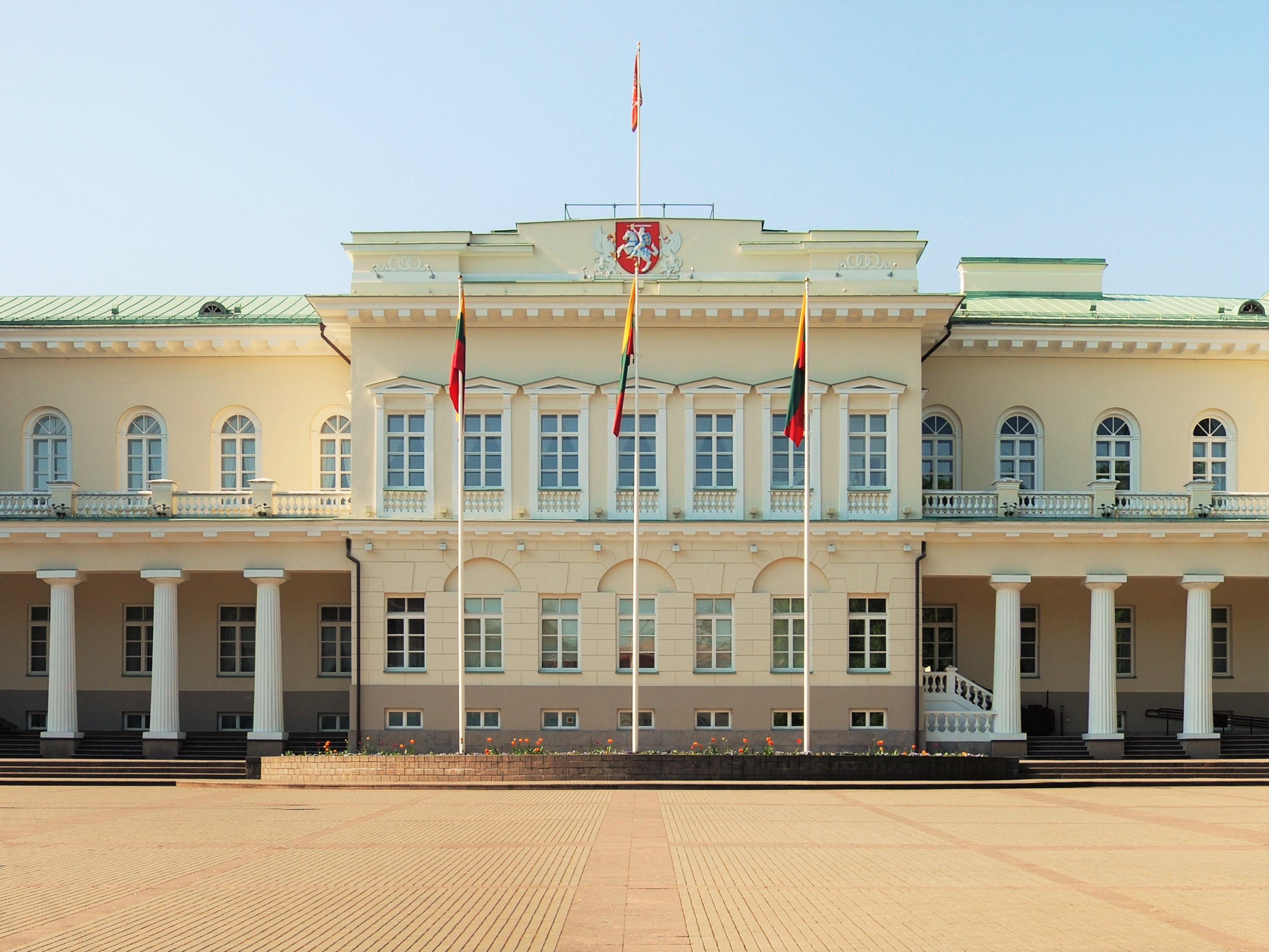
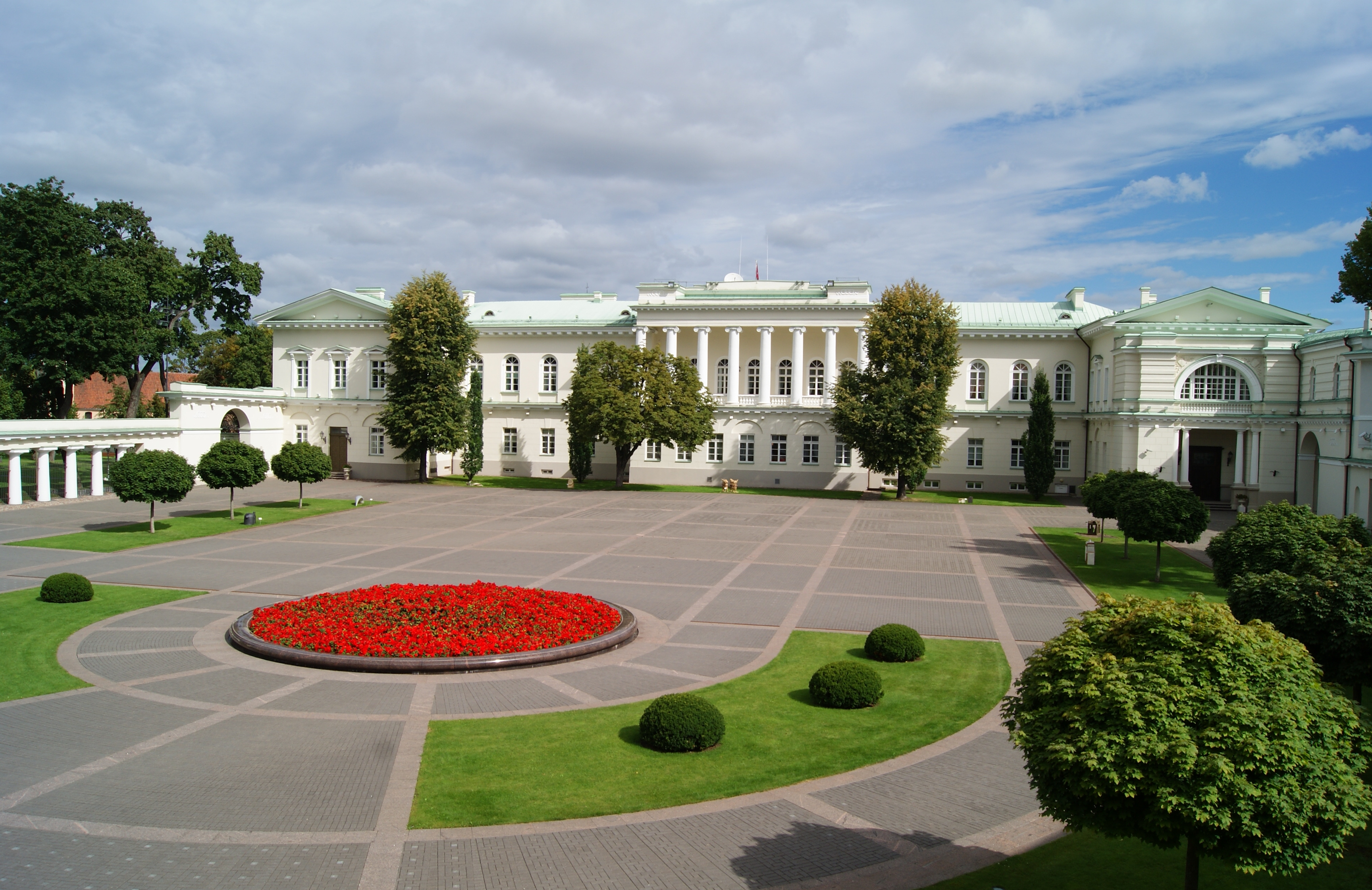
- Main façade from Daukanto Square Courtyard of the Palace

General information
- Architectural style: Empire, Classical Revival
- Location: Vilnius, Lithuania
- Construction started: 14th century
- Completed: Last major reconstruction 1834
- Owner: Government of Lithuania

Design and construction
- Architects: Vasily Stasov, author of last major reconstruction

Website
- lrp.lt

UNESCO World Heritage Site
- Official name: Vilnius Old Town
- Type: Cultural
- Criteria: Cultural: (ii), (iv)
- Designated: 1994
- Reference no.: 541
- UNESCO region: Europe

Cultural Monuments of Lithuania
- Type: National
- Designated: February 13 2008
- Reference no.: 10629

The Presidential Palace (Lithuanian: Prezidentūra) is a Neoclassical palace in Vilnius, Lithuania, serving as the official seat and workplace of the president of Lithuania. Situated on Simonas Daukantas Square in the Old Town, it is one of the city's most prominent examples of Empire style architecture. The palace acquired its present appearance during a major reconstruction carried out between 1824 and 1832 to designs by the Russian architect Vasily Stasov.

The history of the palace dates back to the late 14th century, when it became the residence of the bishops of Vilnius. Following the Third Partition of the Polish–Lithuanian Commonwealth in 1795, the building passed into Russian imperial control and subsequently became the residence of the Governor-General of Vilna. Its notable occupants and guests included Stanisław August Poniatowski, Paul I of Russia, Alexander I of Russia and Napoleon. During the interwar period, when Vilnius was part of Poland, the building served representative functions.

Following the Second World War, the palace was used by Soviet military and cultural institutions. After Lithuania regained independence, it underwent restoration and was adapted for presidential use. Since 1997, it has housed the office of the president of Lithuania and the presidential chancellery.

== History ==
=== Former palace ===
The palace traces its history back to the 14th century, when Jogaila, the grand duke of Lithuania, issued an edict donating land in the city to the Vilnius Diocese, for this reason the palace is sometimes referred to as the Bishops' Palace. Construction of the palace took place in the late 14th century under the auspices of the first Bishop of Vilnius, Andrzej Jastrzębiec, and over succeeding generations, the building was gradually enlarged and renovated. During the Renaissance, the palace was once again renovated, and parks and gardens surrounding the building were expanded.

As the 18th century unfolded, a number of dramatic events in the palace's history took place: the last Bishop of Vilnius lived in the palace, Lithuania was annexed by the Russian Empire, and the building itself was badly damaged by two major fires in 1737 and 1748. The palace was reconstructed in 1750 under the supervision of the architect Laurynas Gucevičius. After its reconstruction, the palace was used as a residence for emperors, kings and noblemen. During 1796, Tsar Paul I lived at the palace. During the course of the 19th century, the palace served as a residence for several Imperial Russian governors, such as Mikhail Muravyov, nicknamed "The Hangman". It was also visited by Louis XVIII, the future king of France, in 1804.

In 1812, both the Russian Tsar Alexander I and the French Emperor Napoleon used the palace as their residence. During Napoleon's invasion of Russia, he organized military operations and Lithuanian army units from this palace, including five regiments of infantry, four cavalry regiments, and the National Guard of Vilnius. He received Lithuanian noblemen, newly appointed officials of the administration, and other dignitaries in this palace as well. After Napoleon's defeat in 1812, the palace was used for ceremonial proposes; it was here that then-general Mikhail Kutuzov was awarded Russia's highest military award – the Order of St. George.

=== New palace ===
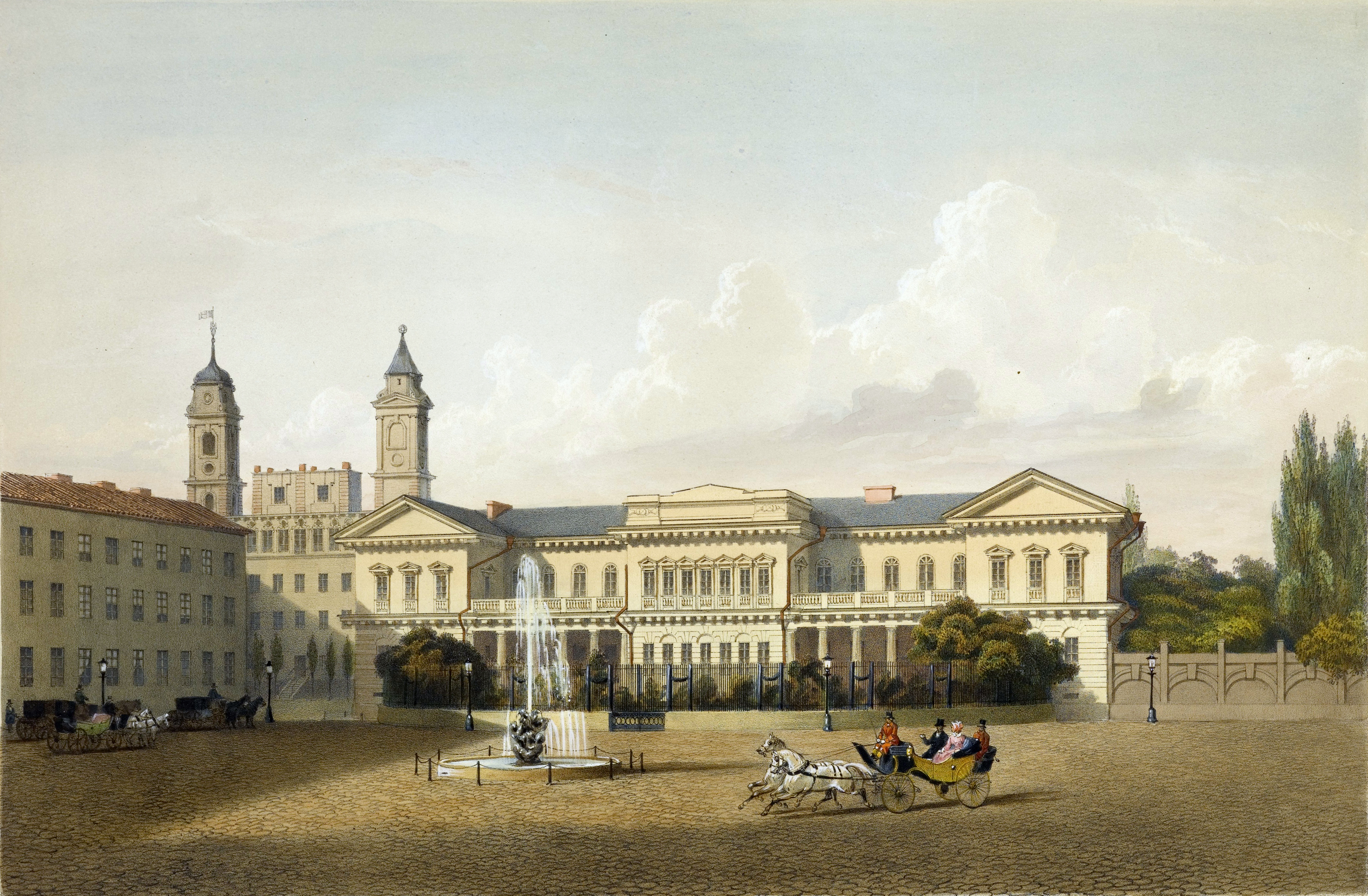
Presidential Palace in 1850

During 1824–1834, the palace was reconstructed by the prominent St. Petersburg architect Vasily Stasov in the Empire style, under supervision of Karol Podczaszyński. Stasov's reconstruction of the palace has remained to this day.

During the First World War, following the German occupation of Vilnius in September 1915, the palace housed the German occupation administration. After Lithuania declared independence in 1918, the building briefly accommodated Lithuanian government institutions, including the Ministry of Foreign Affairs and the ELTA news agency in 1920. Following the seizure of Vilnius by the forces of General Lucjan Żeligowski in October 1920, the palace came under the control of the Republic of Central Lithuania. After the region's incorporation into Poland in 1922, it became the Representative Palace of the Republic of Poland, serving ceremonial and residential functions for visiting state dignitaries. Among its guests were Polish presidents Stanisław Wojciechowski and Ignacy Mościcki, as well as Józef Piłsudski, who frequently stayed at the palace.

During the interwar period, the palace complex also served cultural purposes. In 1926, members of the Reduta Theatre, led by Juliusz Osterwa, were accommodated in one of its wings, which also housed the company's museum and theatrical archive. On 2 July 1927, Reduta staged an open-air performance of The Constant Prince in the square in front of the palace, as part of the celebrations associated with the return of Juliusz Słowacki's remains to Poland. In 1931, the palace's former guardhouse became the temporary home of the newly established Vilnius Museum of Contemporary Art, supported by art historian Stanisław Lorentz and the provincial authorities.

Following the Soviet invasion of Poland in September 1939, Vilnius was transferred to Lithuania in October of that year. In May 1940, a government commission formally proposed transferring the Presidential Office from Kaunas to the palace, but the plan was never implemented before the Soviet occupation of Lithuania in June 1940. In 1940–1941, the square in front of the palace was repaved and planted with chestnut trees. The palace complex survived the war without major destruction.

Following the Soviet reoccupation of Vilnius in 1944, the palace became the Officers' House of the Soviet Army, serving as a venue for military social and cultural activities. Its facilities included a cinema, while the surrounding park accommodated an open-air summer theatre. Between 1972 and 1976, the palace underwent extensive restoration under architect Romualdas Kazlauskas and was subsequently adapted as the Palace of Art Workers. After the restoration of Lithuanian independence in 1990, part of the building was temporarily occupied by the French Embassy. Another major restoration began in 1995, with the palace's historic interiors refurbished and adapted for presidential functions. In 1997, during the presidency of Algirdas Brazauskas, the palace became the official seat of the President of Lithuania and the presidential chancellery. Before him, other presidents never occupied the palace and instead used the Presidential Palace in Kaunas which served as the temporary national capital for 19 years, from 1920 to 1939, while Vilnius was yet to be returned to Lithuania.

Currently, adaptations are underway to expand the palace's functions to also serve as the president's official residence. A flag displaying the coat of arms of the president is hoisted when the president is present in the palace or in the city.

== Public access ==
Guided tours in Lithuanian and English are available for the general public. They are arranged on Saturdays and Sundays free of charge, but require advance registration. Presidential Palace is also open to the public during Open House Vilnius and other open door events.

There is a 1,5 ha gated park, surrounded by a 4-5 meter brick wall. The park is open to the general public outside the regular office hours, during evenings on weekdays and weekends.

== Gallery ==
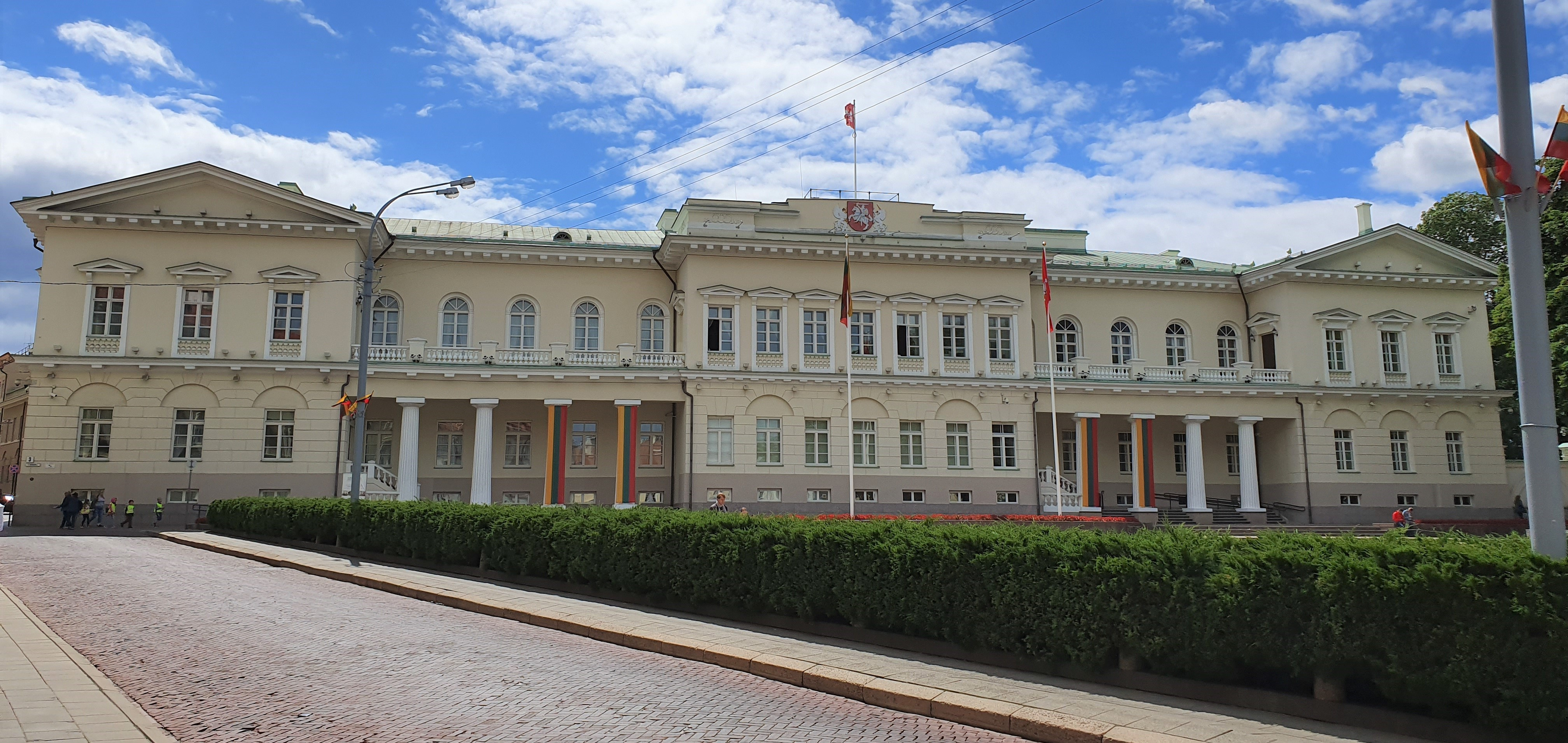
Façade of the Palace in 2019

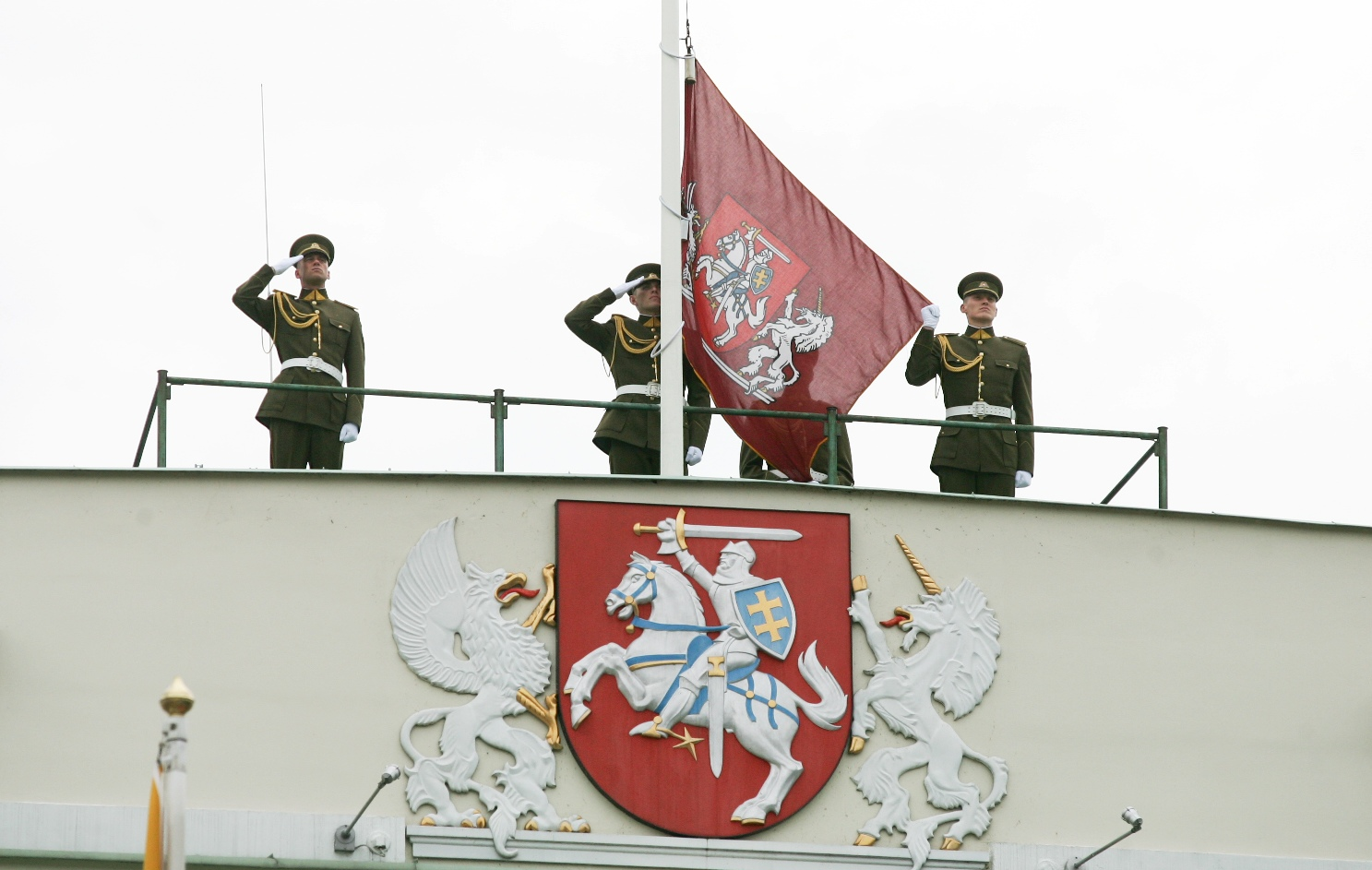
Hoisting the presidential flag during the inauguration ceremony

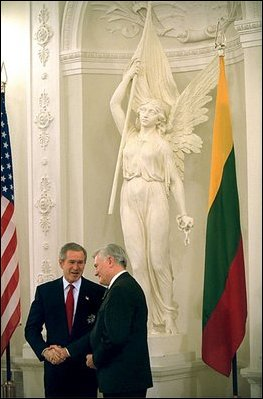
Lithuanian and American Presidents Valdas Adamkus and George W. Bush in the White Hall in 2002

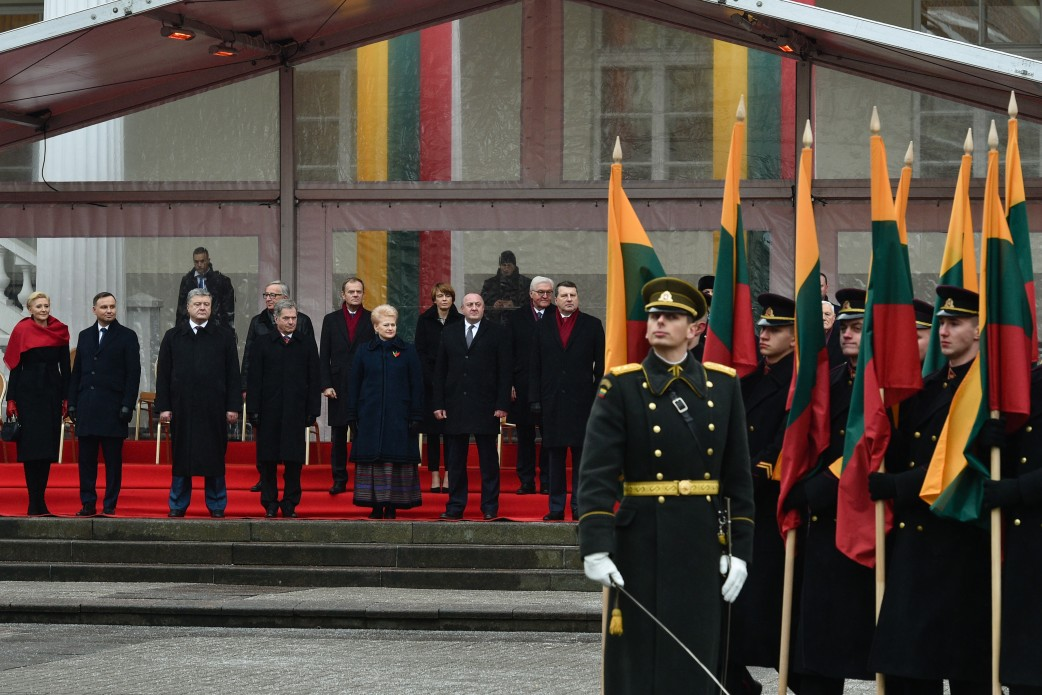
The Commemoration Ceremony of the 100th Anniversary of the Act of Independence of Lithuania in front of the Palace in 2018

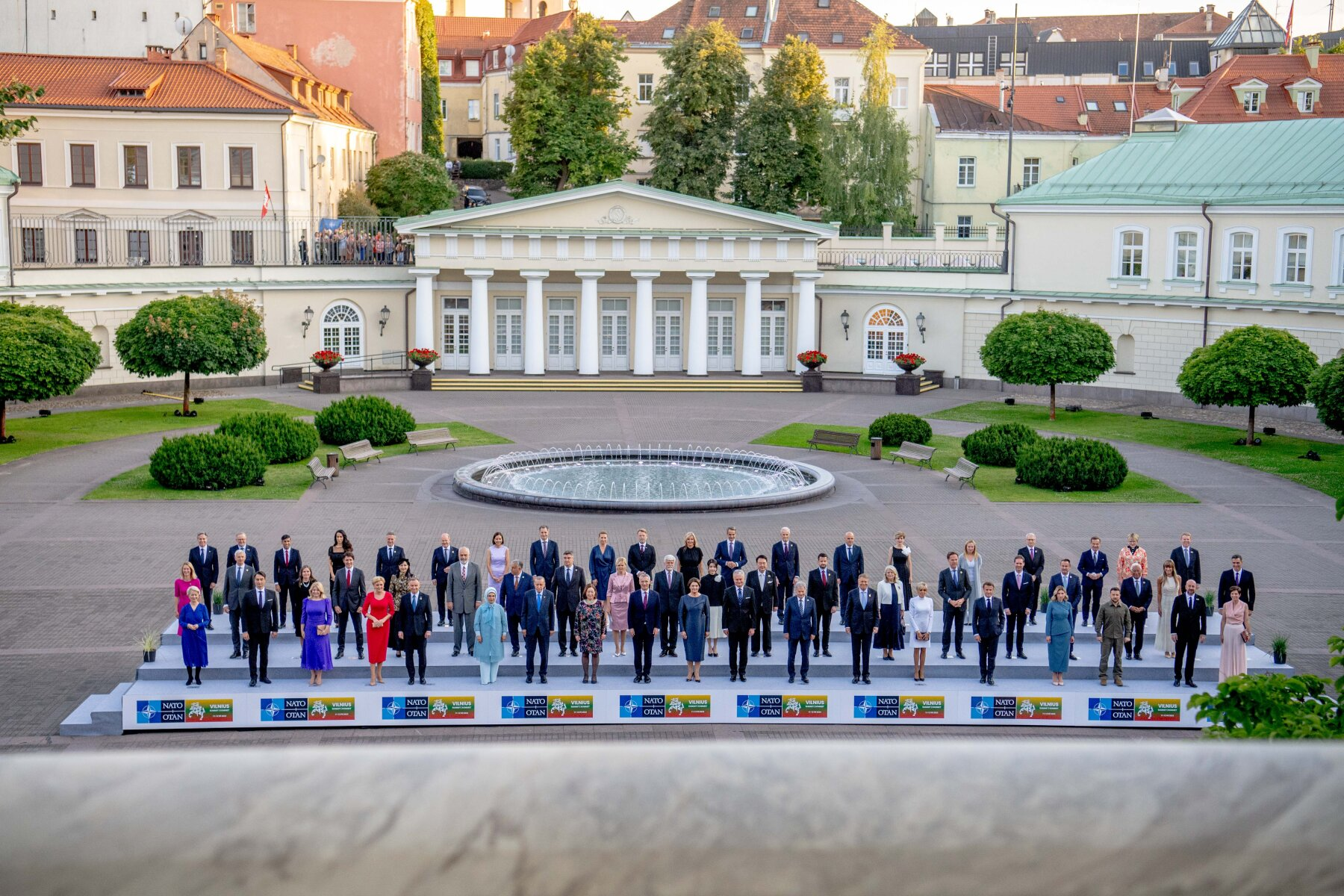
Guests of the 2023 Vilnius Summit in the Courtyard of the Palace

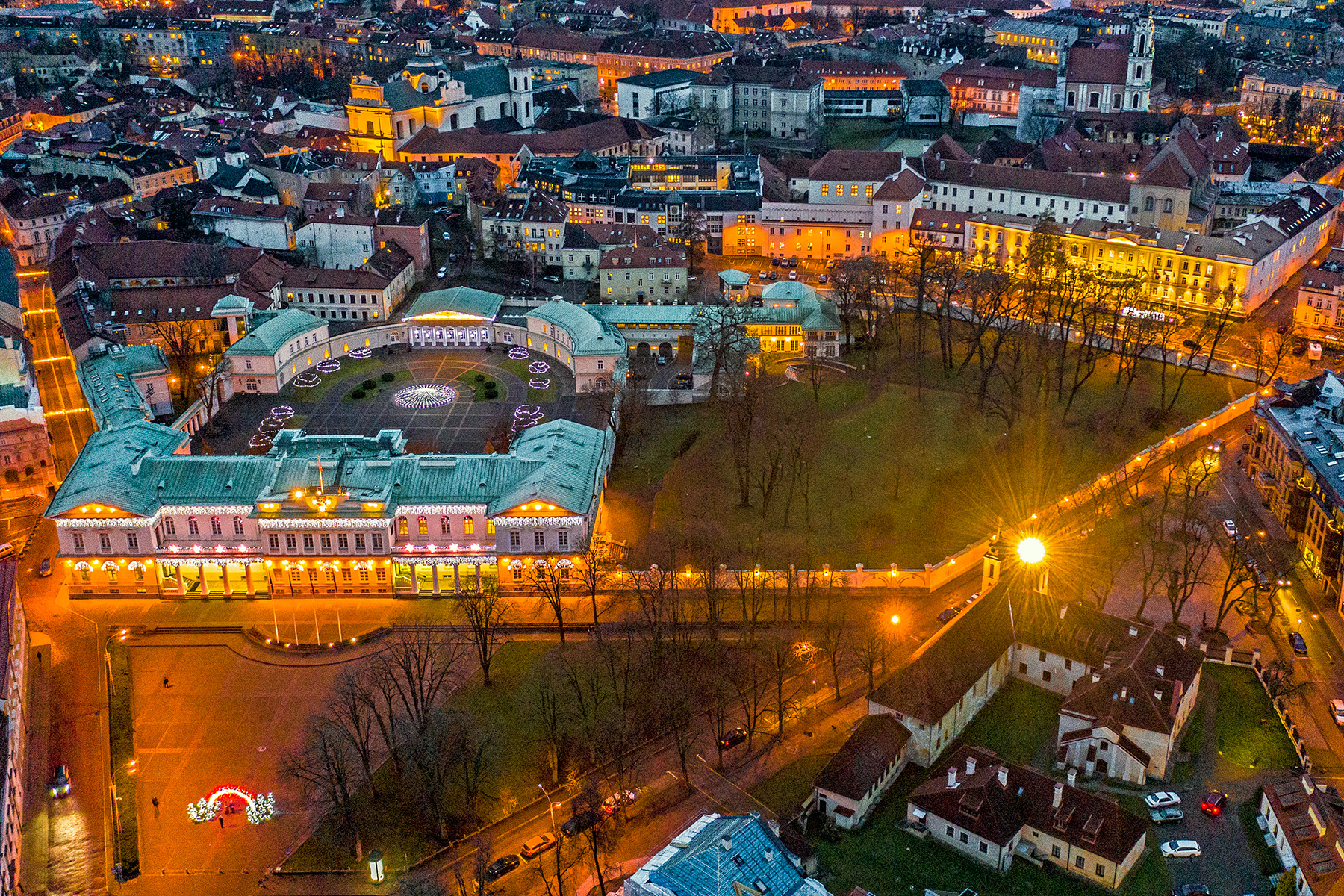
Aerial view (green rooftops)

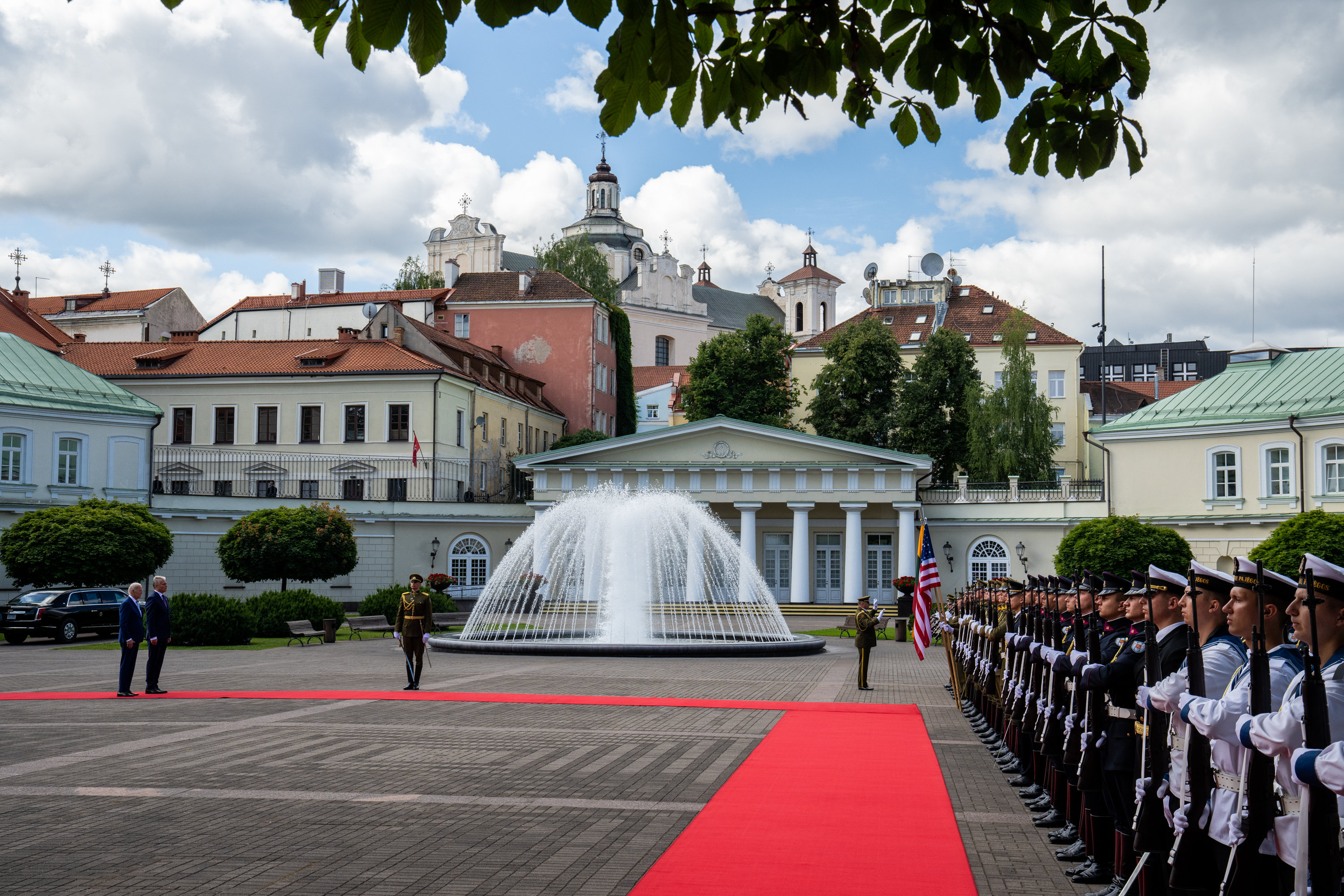
Inside the Courtyard of the Presidential Palace during the welcoming ceremony of American President Joe Biden in 2023

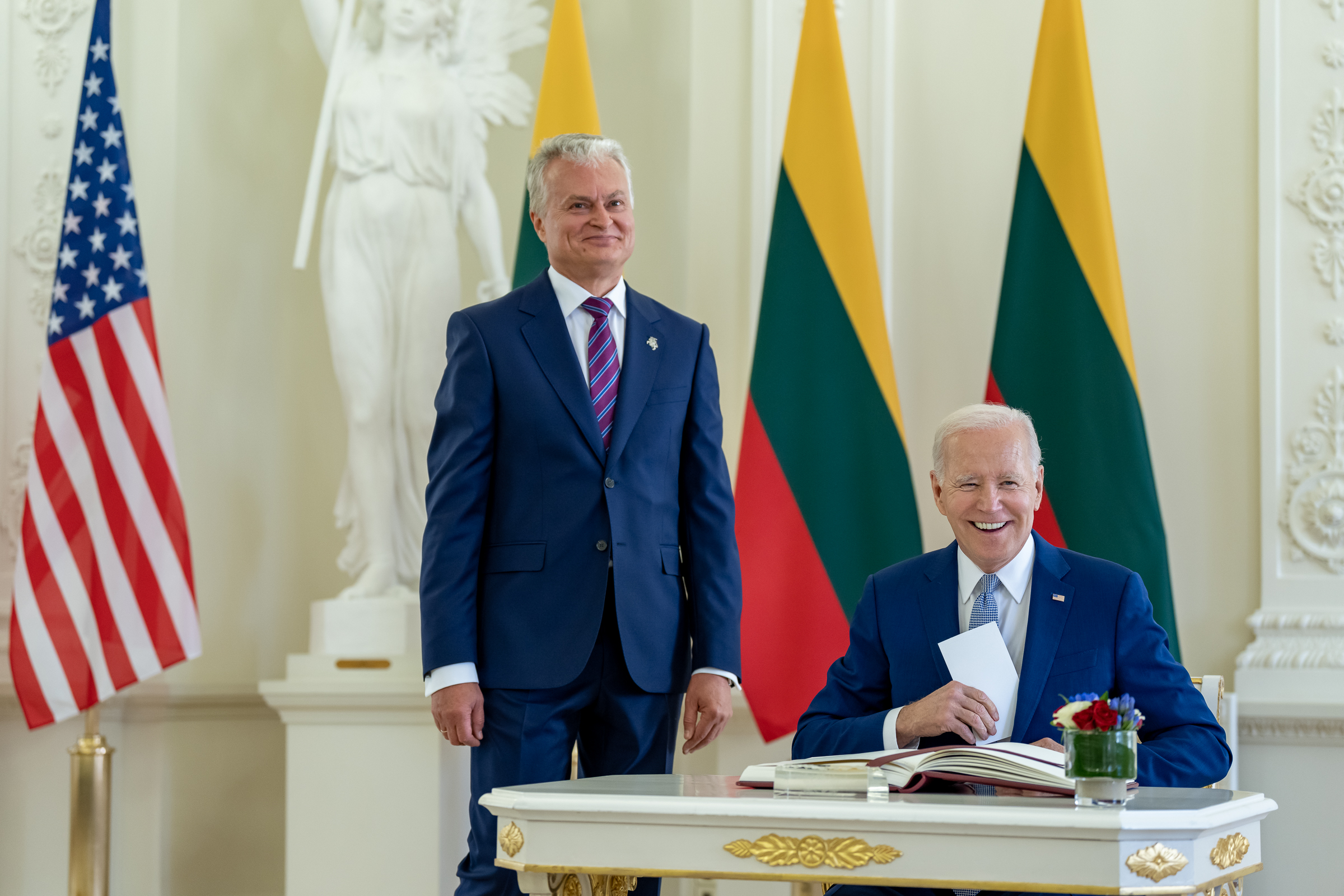
American President Joe Biden signing in a guests book in the White Hall nearby Lithuanian President Gitanas Nausėda

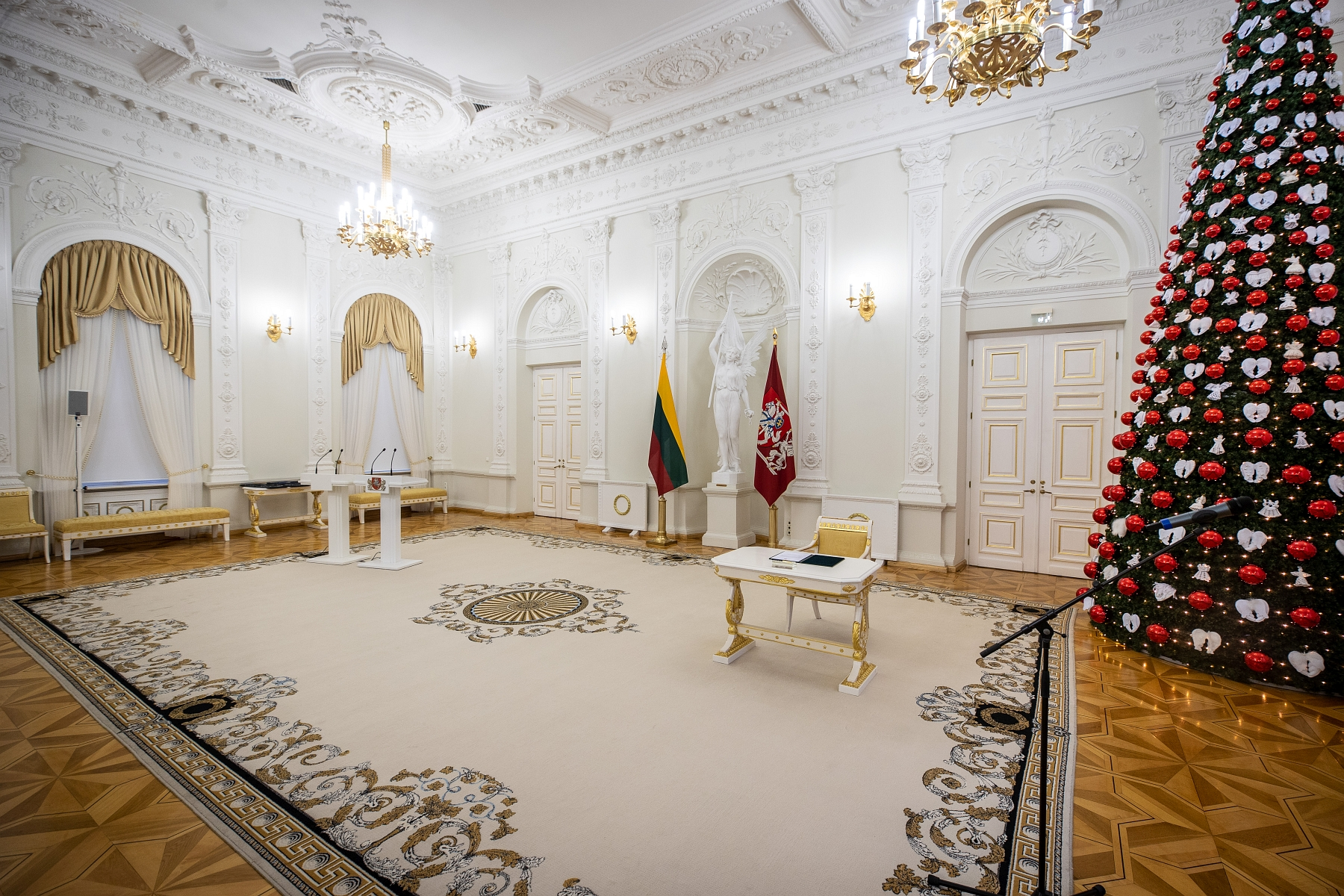
The White Hall of the Palace (the main representative hall where guests are welcomed and events are held)

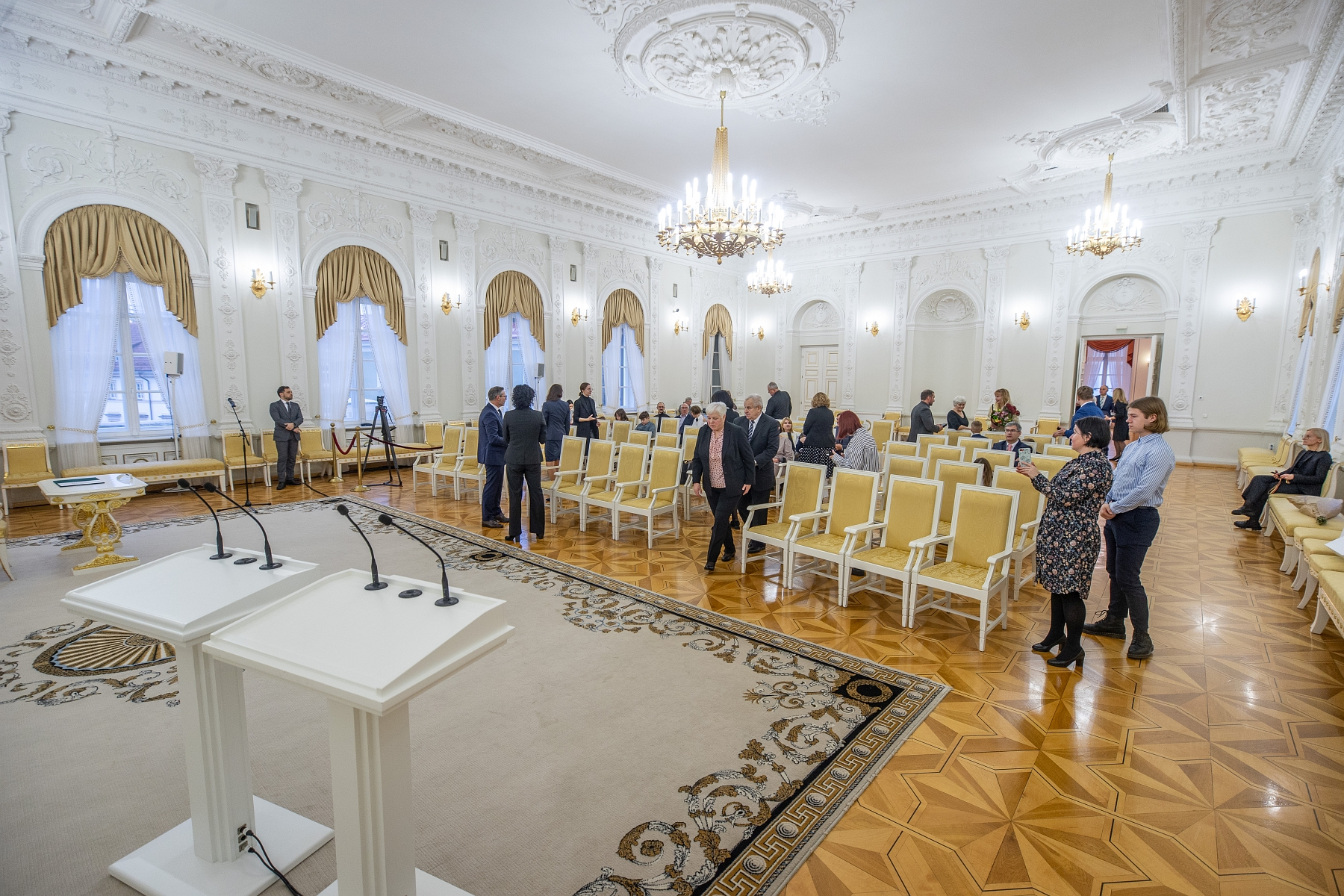
The White Hall of the Palace

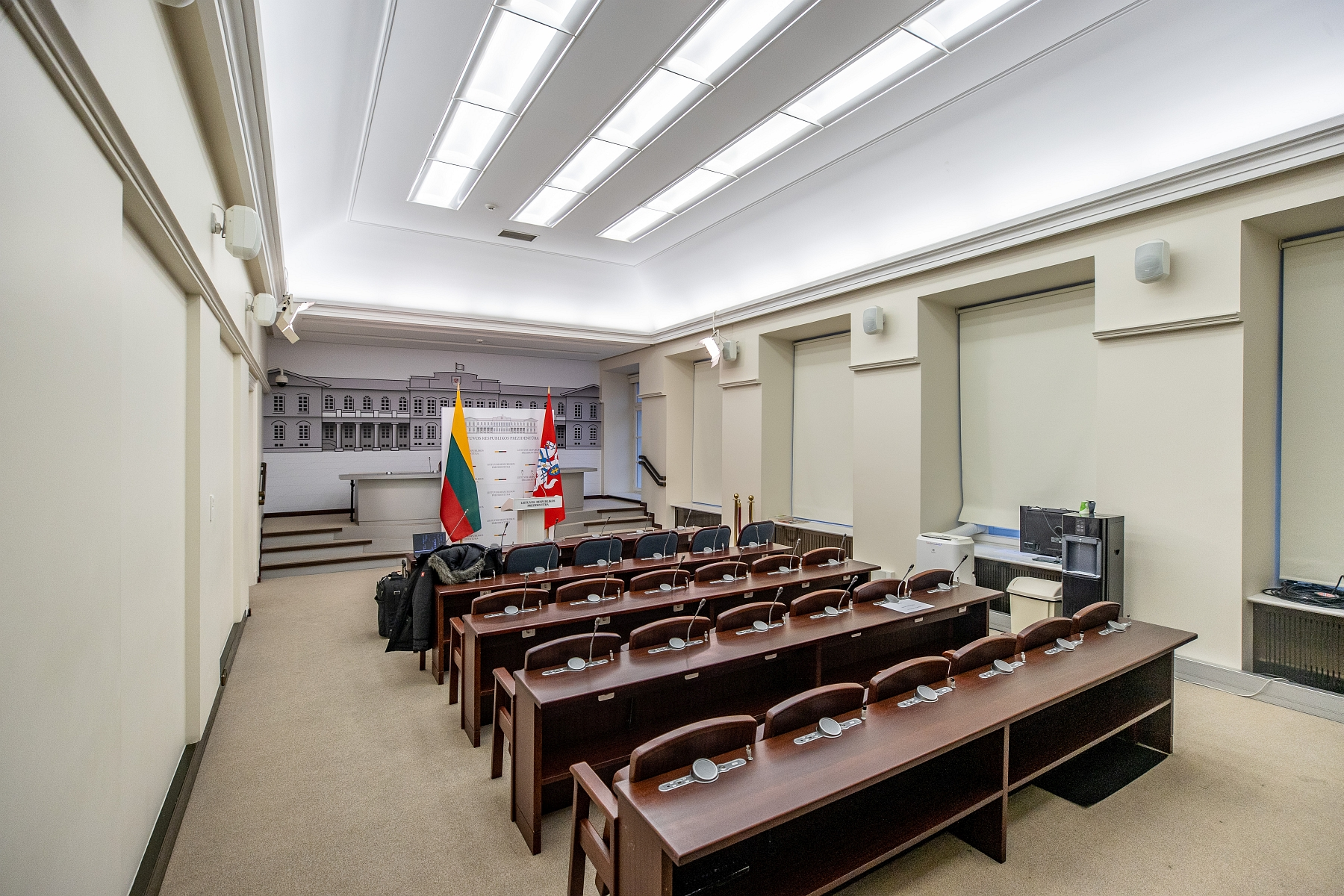
The Press Room of the Palace

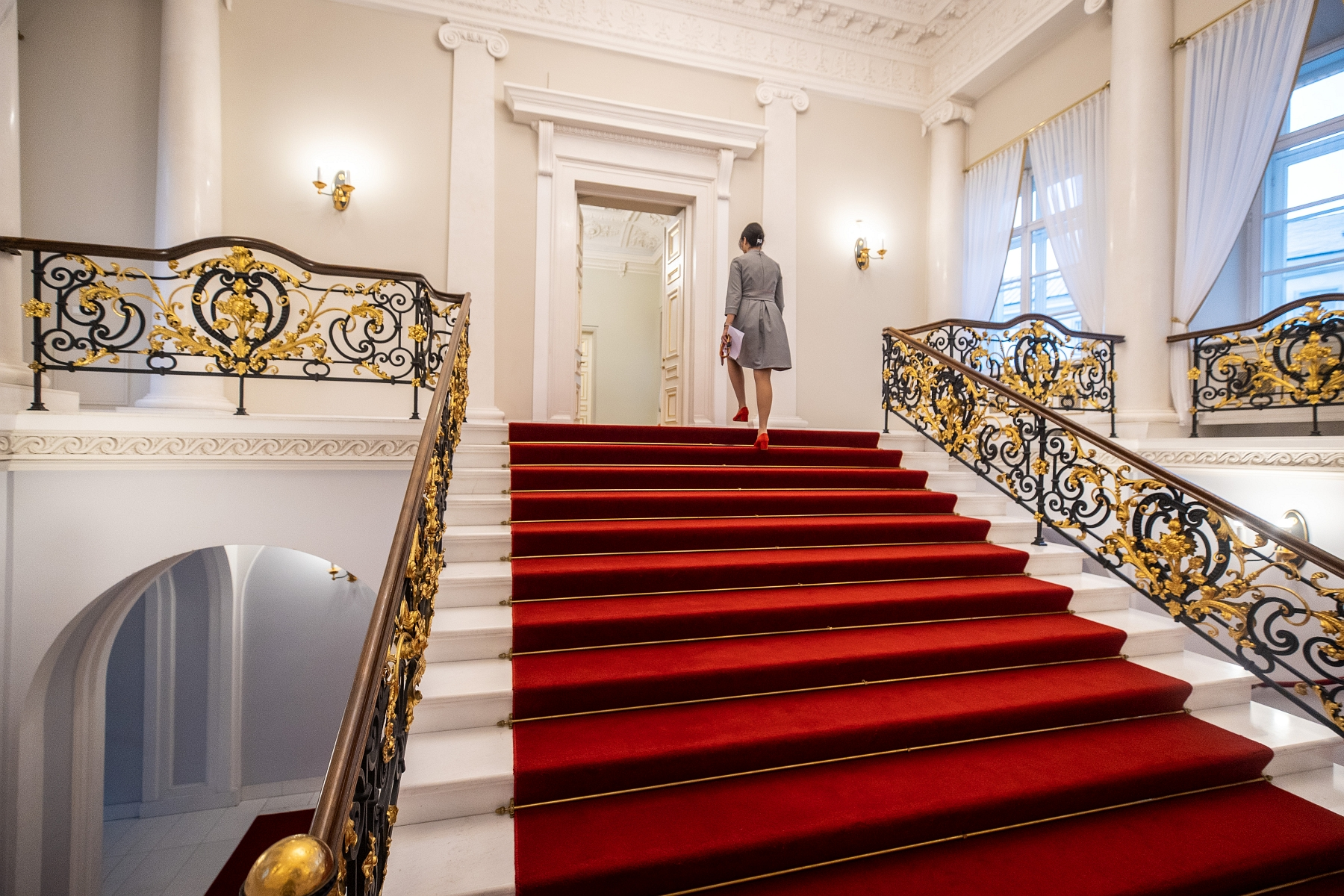
Staircase inside the Palace

== See also ==
- Historical Presidential Palace, Kaunas

== Bibliography ==
- Kłos, Juliusz (1937). Wilno. Przewodnik krajoznawczy (in Polish) (3rd, revised ed.). Wilno: Wydawnictwo Wileńskiego Oddziału Polskiego Towarzystwa Turystyczno-Krajoznawczego.
