= Registry of Cultural Property (Lithuania) =

Registry of Cultural Property Kultūros vertybių registras
- Seal of a Heritage Object ("paveldo objektas") in Lithuania
- Type: Heritage register of natural, historic places and moveable cultural objects
- Country: Lithuania
- Years: 2005–present
- Compiled by: Republic of Lithuania via the Department of Cultural Heritage
- Approved by: Minister of Culture

Registry of Cultural Property (Lithuanian: Kultūros vertybių registras) is a heritage register for Lithuanian cultural property deemed to be of outstanding heritage significance. The list includes natural, historic places and cultural objects. The registry itself has legal authority.

Valid since 2005, but officially established in 2007 by the decree of the Government of Lithuania and managed by the Department of Cultural Heritage. In 2020, the Register of Cultural Property contained more than 25,000 individual and complex immovable cultural property items and parts thereof, and more than 7,000 movable cultural property items.

Decisions regarding the inclusion of cultural property in the Register list are taken by the Minister of Culture, on the advice of the Cultural Heritage Appraisal Board.

== List of the Monuments of Culture of Lithuania ==
Location	Object	Image	Date of entry
Biržai	Biržai Castle		12 June 1998
Tytuvėnai	Tytuvėnai Monastery		12 June 1998
Norviliškės	Norviliškės Castle		12 June 1998
Raudonė	Raudonė Castle		12 June 1998
Vilnius	Vilnius Town Hall		12 June 1998
Trakai	Trakai Peninsula Castle		12 June 1998
Liškiava	Monastery and Church of the Holy Trinity		12 June 1998
Klaipėda	Klaipėda Castle		12 June 1998
Medininkai	Medininkai Castle		12 June 1998
Alytus	Alytus Mound		12 June 1998
Simnas	Church of the Assumption of the Virgin Mary		12 June 1998
Vieškūnai	Vieškūnai Mound		12 June 1998
Jieznas	Church of St. Michael the Archangel and John the Baptist		12 June 1998
Kernavė	Kernavė Mounds		23 December 1999
Trakai	Užutrakis Manor		23 December 1999
Vilnius	Church of St. Francis and St. Bernard and Church of St. Anne		23 December 1999
Girkalnis	Biliūnai Manor		12 September 2000
Pakruojis	Pakruojis Manor		12 September 2000
Vilnius	Minor Radvilos Palace		12 September 2000
Kaunas	Pažaislis Monastery		12 September 2000
Šiauliai	Cathedral of Saints Peter and Paul		12 September 2000
Vilnius	Church of Saint Nicholas		12 September 2000
Lioliai	Church of St Simon and Jude Thaddeus		12 September 2000
Plungė	Plungė Manor		12 September 2000
Raguvėlė	Raguvėlė Manor		12 September 2000
Vilnius	Cathedral Basilica of St Stanislaus and St Ladislaus of Vilnius		20 November 2001
Rokiškis	Rokiškis Manor		20 November 2001
Vilnius	Vilnius Castle Complex		20 November 2001
Šiauliai	Chaimas Frenkelis Villa		20 November 2001
Vilnius	Francisian Monastery and Church of the Assumption of the Blessed Virgin Mary		20 November 2001
Kaunas	Church of Vytautas the Great		15 October 2002
Kaunas	Cathedral Basilica of apostles St. Peter and St. Paul		15 October 2002
Vilnius	Benedictine monastery and Church of St. Catherine		15 October 2002
Zapyškis	Old Church of St John the Baptist		15 October 2002
Kaunas	Church of St. Gertrude		15 October 2002
Kražiai	Kražiai College		15 October 2002
Vilnius	Vileišis Palace		9 October 2003
Kaunas	Siručiai Palace		9 October 2003
Kaunas	Kaunas Castle		9 October 2003
Kaunas	Kaunas Town Hall		9 October 2003
Kaunas	Aleksotas Funicular and Žaliakalnis Funicular		9 October 2003
Apuolė	Apuolė Hillfort		13 February 2008
Vilnius	Chodkevičiai Palace		13 February 2008
Vilnius	Monastery of Calced Carmelites and the Church of St. Theresa		13 February 2008
Trakai	Trakai Island Castle		13 February 2008
Vilnius	Church of St. Peter and St. Paul		13 February 2008
Vilnius	Verkiai Palace		13 February 2008
Raudondvaris	Raudondvaris Castle		13 February 2008
Vilkaviškis	Paežeriai Manor		13 February 2008
Vilnius	Presidential Palace		13 February 2008
Vilnius	Lithuanian National Philharmonic		13 February 2008
Vilnius	Vilnius University and Church of St. Johns		13 February 2008
Siesikai	Siesikai Castle		13 February 2008
Cirkliškis	Cirkliškis Manor		13 February 2008
Palanga	Tiškevičiai Palace		13 February 2008
Lentvaris	Lentvaris Manor		13 February 2008
Baisogala	Baisogala Manor		13 February 2008
Ignalina	Dūkštas Manor		13 February 2008
Jašiūnai	Jašiūnai Manor		13 February 2008
Gelgaudiškis	Gelgaudiškis Manor		13 February 2008
Biržai	Astravas Manor		13 February 2008
Širvintos	Šešuolėliai Manor		13 February 2008
Biržuvėnai	Biržuvėnai Manor		13 February 2008
Kaunas	Aukštoji Freda Manor		13 February 2008
Varniai	Church of St. Peter and St. Paul		13 February 2008
Lighthouse	Pervalka Lighthouse		13 February 2008
Alsėdžiai	Church of the Immaculate Conception		13 February 2008
Pikeliai	Church of the Holy Trinity		13 February 2008
Žemaičių Kalvarija	Basilica of the Visitation of the Holy Virgin Mary		13 February 2008
Telšiai	Bernardine Monastery and Cathedral of St. Anthony of Padua		13 February 2008
Kaunas	Church of St. Francis Xavier		13 February 2008
Kaunas	House of Perkūnas		13 February 2008
Vilnius	Old Regula Carmelite Monastery and Church of All Saints		13 February 2008
Vilnius	Orthodox Monastery of the Holy Spirit and Church of the Holy Spirit		13 February 2008
Kaunas	Bernardine Monastery and Church of St. George the Martyr		13 February 2008
Šiluva	Basilica of the Nativity of the Blessed Virgin Mary		13 February 2008
Kretinga	Kretinga Bernardine Monastery		13 February 2008
Senieji Trakai	Senieji Trakai Castle		13 February 2008
Kaunas	Kaunas Clinics		7 May 2008
Vilnius	Rasos Cemetery		13 February 2013
Vilnius	Sapiega Palace		26 June 2015
Vytėnai	Panemunė Castle		11 December 2017
Kaunas	Kaunas Central Post Office		31 July 2019
	Source: Registry of Cultural Property		
