= Cinema Glory (Moscow) =

Cinema in Moscow, Russia

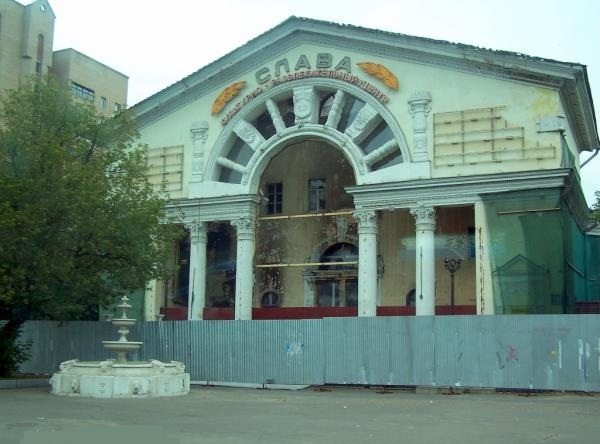
- Interactive map of Cinema Glory
- Address: Moscow; Russia
- Coordinates: 55.7617°N 37.7733°E
- Capacity: 800 people

Construction
- Closed: 2007 (burned)
- Architect: Ivan Zholtovsky, Nikolay Sukoyan

Cinema Glory (Russian: Кинотеатр Слава) was a Moscow theater landmark in Moscow and Perovo District. It was set on fire twice; most recently on February 3, 2007, by an unidentified person. The theater remained closed thereafter. The cinema historically housed 2 auditoriums with a total of 440 seats. The cinema had 3 floors. The cinema also had rooms with a restaurant, pool tables, café and sushi bar.

== History ==
Construction of Cinema Glory began in Moscow in 1954. The designs of the proposed cinema were completed by the Soviet architects - Ivan Zholtovsky, Nikolay Sukoyan, V. Voskresensky and others. The construction of the theatre ended in 1958. In 2006 the theatre was closed and "Glory" was handed over to the tenants. The Cinema was leased for 49 years. The purchase price was 2.891 million rubles. In 2007, unknown persons set fire to the cinema and disappeared - burning it to the ground. In 2006, the cinema "Glory" was seized by armed men. The cause was a raider seizure, which triggered the city authorities against the tenants.

=== Fire ===
On February 3, 2007, around 12:00 P.M., unknown individuals lit a fire at the cinema. About 40 fire brigades tried to put out the blaze. Two firefighters were injured. At 16:05 the same day, the fire was completely extinguished.

In February 2007, unknown persons set fire to the cinema and disappeared - burning it to the ground. In 2006, the cinema "Glory" was seized by armed men. The cause was a raider seizure, which triggered the city authorities against the tenants. Since then, the theater was closed.

=== Capacity ===
Cinema Thank had 2 of the auditorium for 440 seats. In sum, both halls had a capacity of 880 people.

=== External description of the cinema ===
The Central part of the facade of the cinema "Glory" is more reminiscent of the main facade of the building Racing community, located in Moscow, Begovaya street, built in 1903–1905.

=== Reconstruction ===
Reconstruction of the burned in 2007 cinema Glory in its historical form was planned in 2008.

In 2009 appeared the decree of the Government of Moscow, which was donated to the operational management of the Department of cultural heritage.

It was planned that the reconstruction was supposed to last until 2013. In 2013, company "World invest" has won the tender to lease the building for a period of 49 years on the program "a rouble for a meter", but due to the commitments of the restoration contract was terminated. The building then stood empty and destroyed, a new stage of work not started.

In October 2017 the cinema was put up for auction in November 2017 — sold at auction for 32,3 million roubles. Restoration of buildings and arrangement in this cultural and leisure centre provides the LLC "Camellia", which became the investor of the project.

Under the agreement, the investor will have to restore the building and adapt it for cultural and recreational center for the preservation, including the function of screening.

In November 2017, the Moscow public figure Andrey Smagin wrote an appeal to the Moscow City Duma Deputy Aleksandr Smetanov about the restoration of the Cinema Glory, and after a while got an answer:

Dear Andrey Maksimovic! Your treatment of me was prepared and sent a request to the head of the Department of cultural heritage of Moscow. The results of the consideration you will be informed.

On 7 November 2017, received a response from the Department of cultural heritage of Moscow about the restoration of the theater.

On 4 December 2017, the district Council Perovo held a meeting, which was attended by: Aleksandr Smetanov, the head of Council Dmitry Plakhikh, head of the municipal education Andrey Tyurin and the investor of the cinema, which would be to restore it.
