= Freda, Kaunas =

Coordinates: 54°52′N 23°55′E

Freda (Polish: Freda) is part of the Lithuanian city of Kaunas on the left bank of the Nemunas, east of Aleksotas. It is Divided into High Freda (Aukštoji Freda) (on the slope) and Low Freda (Žemoji Freda) (Nemunas coast). It occupies an area of 416 hectares. The main street is European Prospect. Čiurlionis Bridge (opened in 2002) connects with Kaunas center.

== Gallery ==
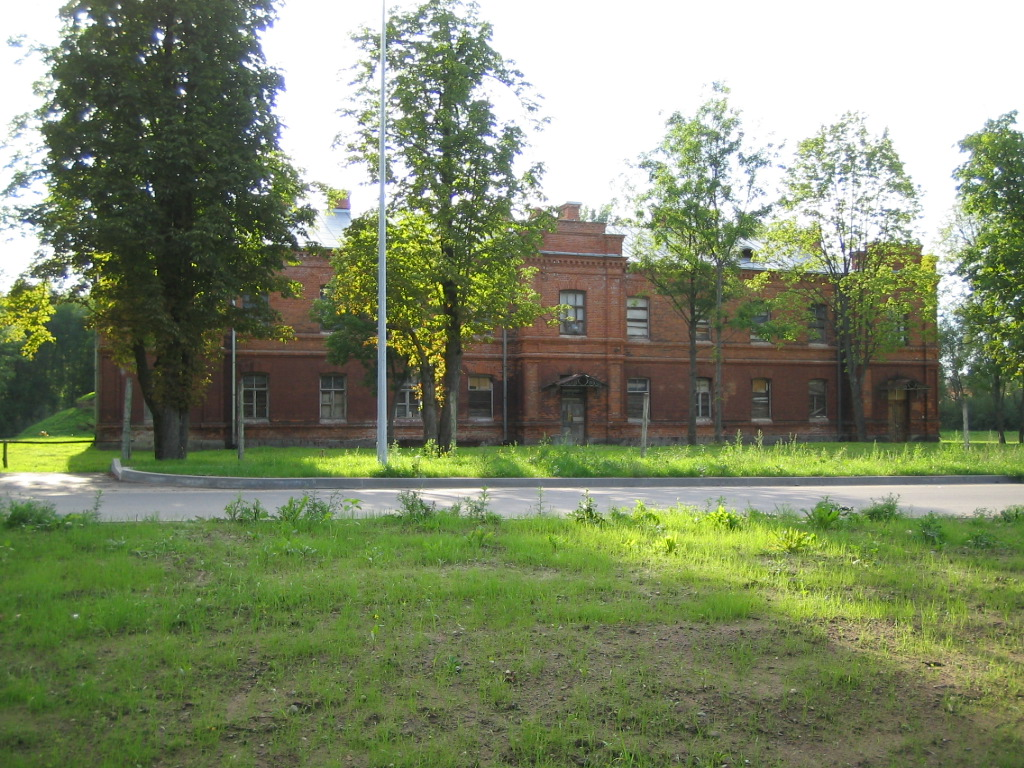
Former barracks

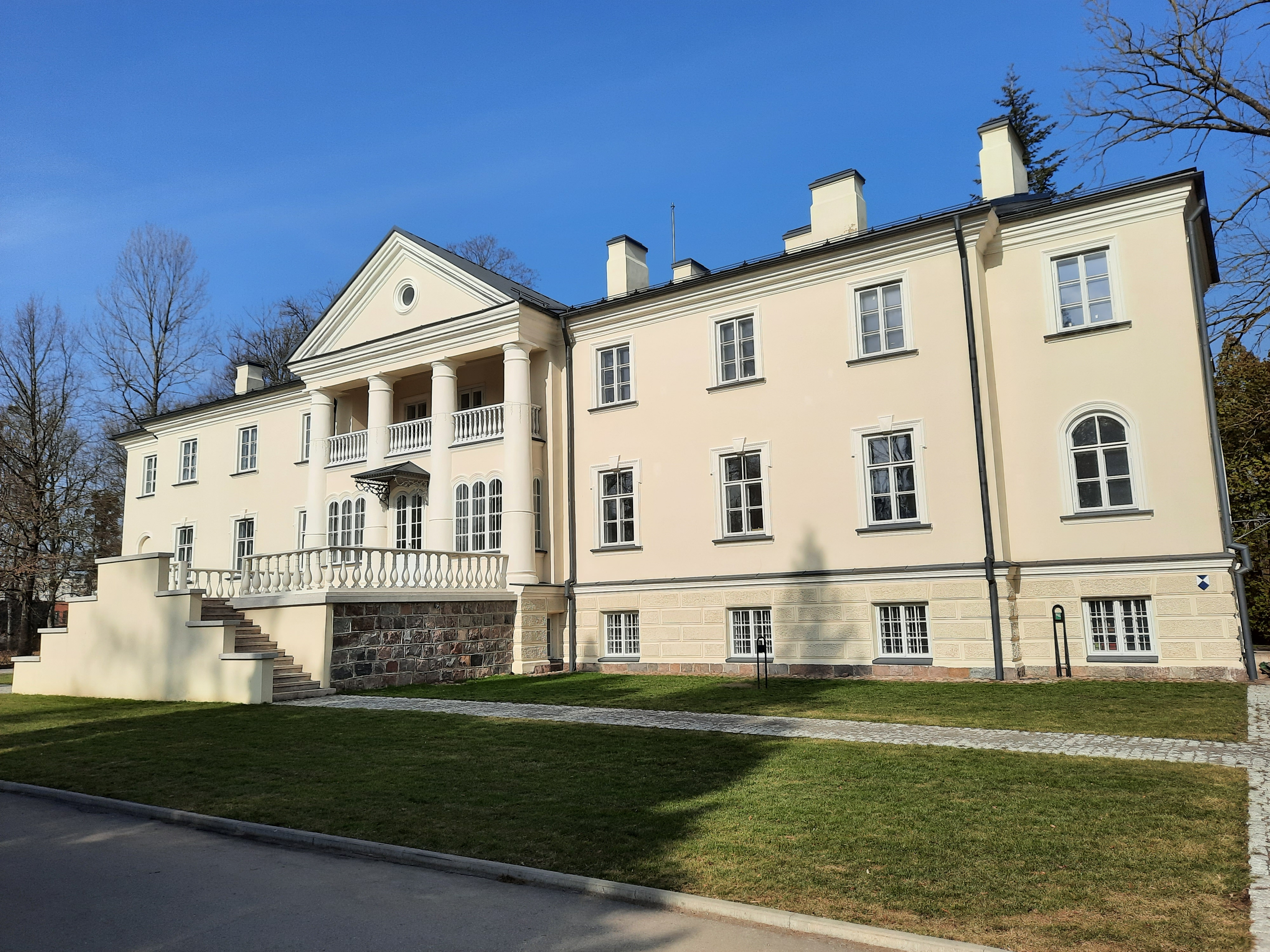
Aukštoji Freda Manor
