= Lentvaris Manor =

Manor house in Lentvaris, Lithuania

- Lentvario dvaras (Lithuanian)
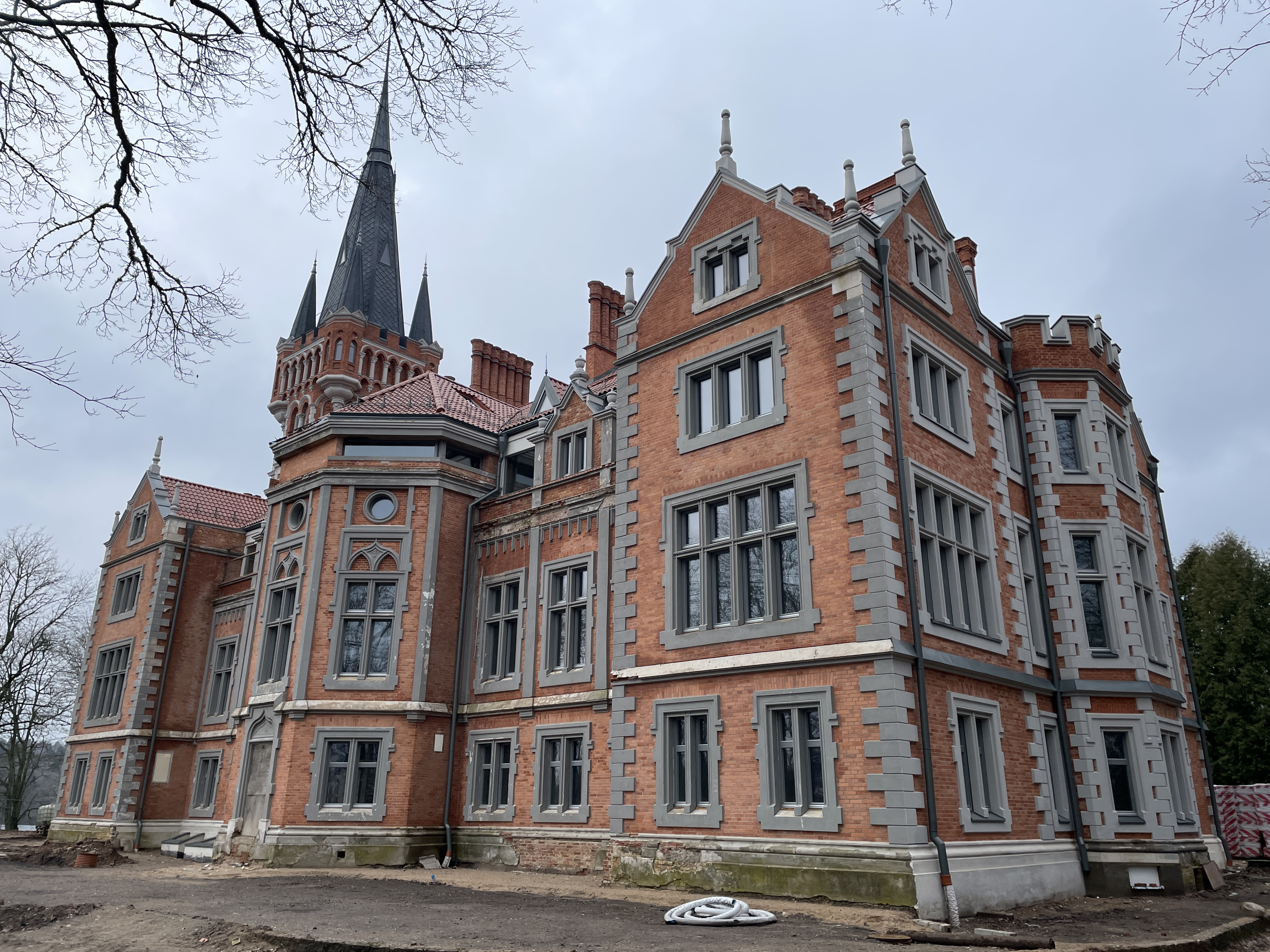
- Lentvaris Manor in 2024

- Location within Lithuania
- Interactive map of Lentvaris Manor
- 54.6583°N 25.0395°E
- Type: Residential manor
- Location: Lentvaris, Lithuania

History
- Built: 1861–1869
- Built for: Vladislovas Tiškevičius II

Site notes
- Architect(s): Friedrich Gustaw von Schacht, de Vegas (Waegh)
- Architectural styles: Gothic Revival, High Victorian Gothic

Cultural Monuments of Lithuania
- Type: National
- Designated: 13 February 2008
- Reference no.: 22202

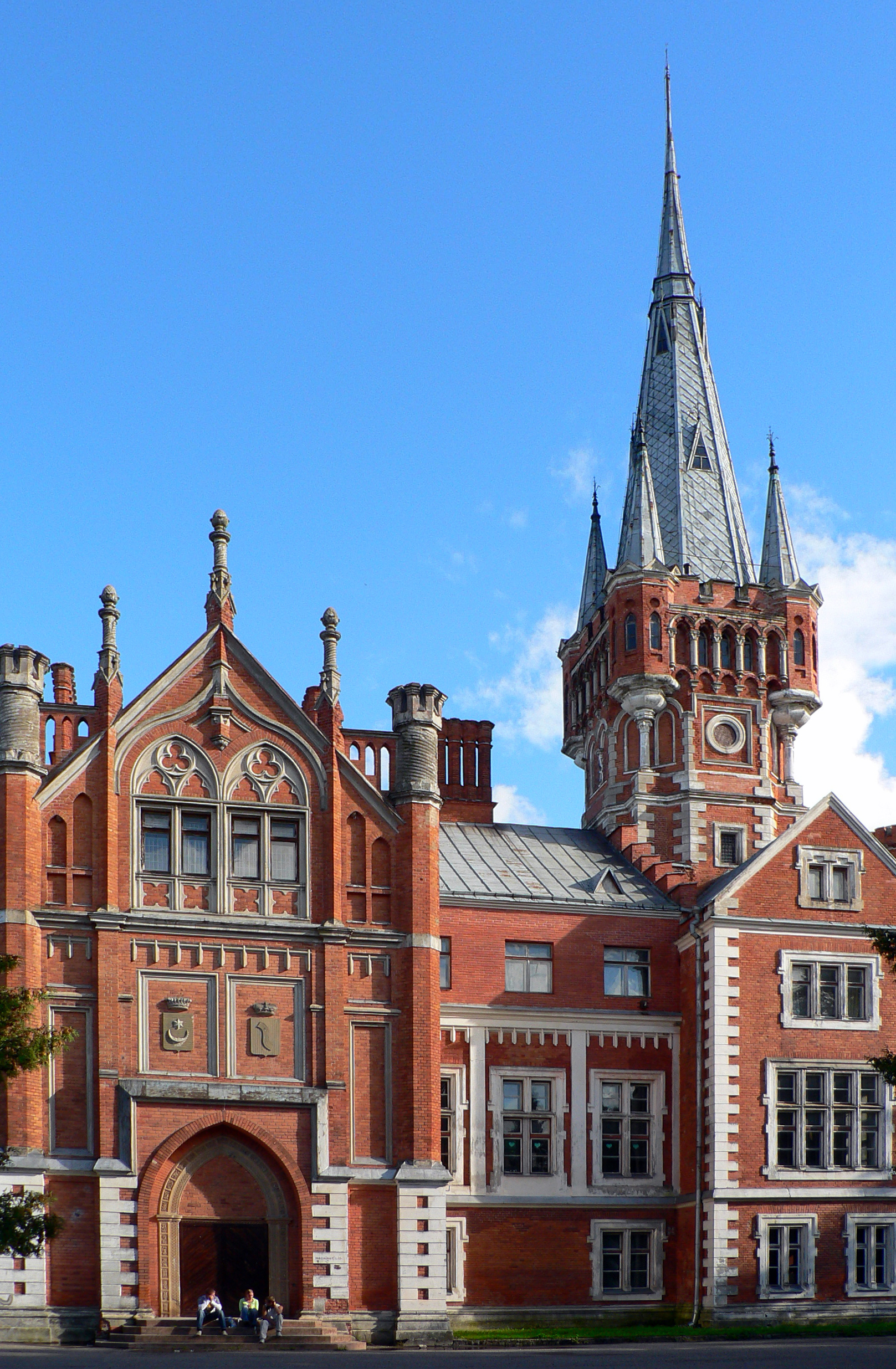
Lentvaris Manor in 2006

Lentvaris Manor (Lithuanian: Lentvario dvaras, Polish: Pałac Tyszkiewiczów w Landwarowie) is a former residential manor in Lentvaris, Trakai District Municipality, Lithuania.

Founded in the 16th century, the manor homestead stands on the northern shore of Lake Lentvaris, which was artificially created by pouring an embankment over the lake.

Lentvaris manor is registered in the Registry of Cultural Property and is a state-protected object, and is administered by the Department of Cultural Heritage.

== Buildings ==
- 19th-century Gothic Revival palace built in 1861-1869 by a project of the architect Gustaw von Schacht, reconstructed in 1899 according to the project of the Belgian architect de Vegas (Waegh) and the architect T. Rostvorowski;
- Servants Quarters', built at the end of the 19th century;
- Brick-style barn (early 19th century);
- Stables (late 19th - early 20th century);
- English Park, founded in the 19th century. end, landscape architect Édouard André.

== History ==
In the 16th century, the estate, then known as Litwaryszki, belonged to Jan Sokołowicz-Kuncewicz, Marshal of the Royal Court. It was later acquired through marriage by Marcin Komorowski. At the beginning of the 17th century, it was purchased by the Sapiehas. Between 1668 and 1760, the estate belonged to the Benedictine nuns of Vilnius. Jan Mikołaj Chodkiewicz recovered it from them through legal proceedings. After his death, it came into the possession of the Francuzowicz, Hryniewicz, Dąbrowski, and Szachno families.

Following the partitions of the Polish–Lithuanian Commonwealth the town became part of the Russian Empire.

=== 19th century ===
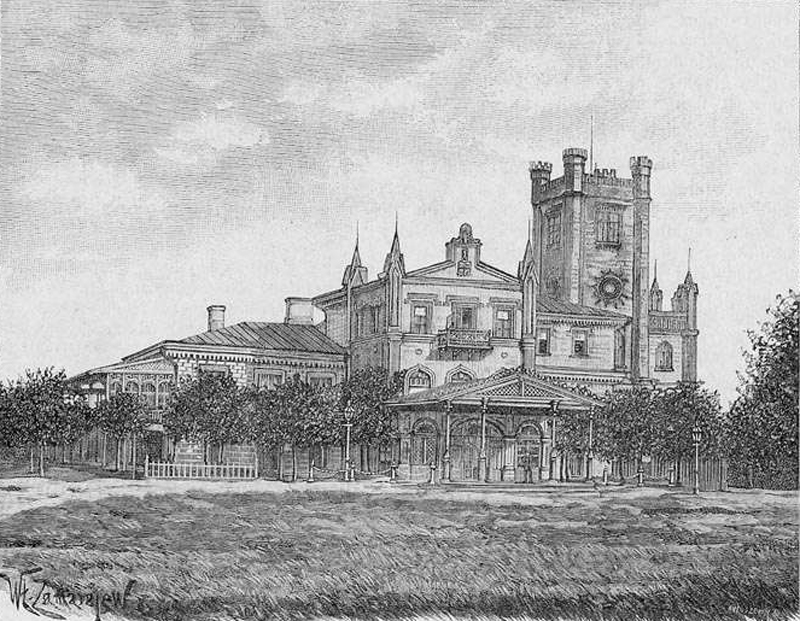
Lentvaris Palace in the 19th century

In 1850 the estate was bought from the Szachno family by Count Józef Tyszkiewicz (1835-1891). In 1885 he had a Tudor-style palace built on the northern shore of Lake Lentvaris, which was widened during 1850-1873; a causeway connected the estate, which was surrounded on three sides by water, with the town.

The manor house was built in two stages. In 1865-1866 it was led by Gustav Shachn. The manor house was a two or three-storey building with a wide entrance porch façade, a tall tower on the southwest side, and on the other side had a lower, two-storey wing. It faced the lake. It was in Józef Tyszkiewicz’s time that almost all the farm buildings were built as well.

Józef also planted a large park next to it, designed by the well-known French landscape architect Édouard André: local and foreign trees (larch, gray walnut, silver and Swedler maples, etc.) predominated.

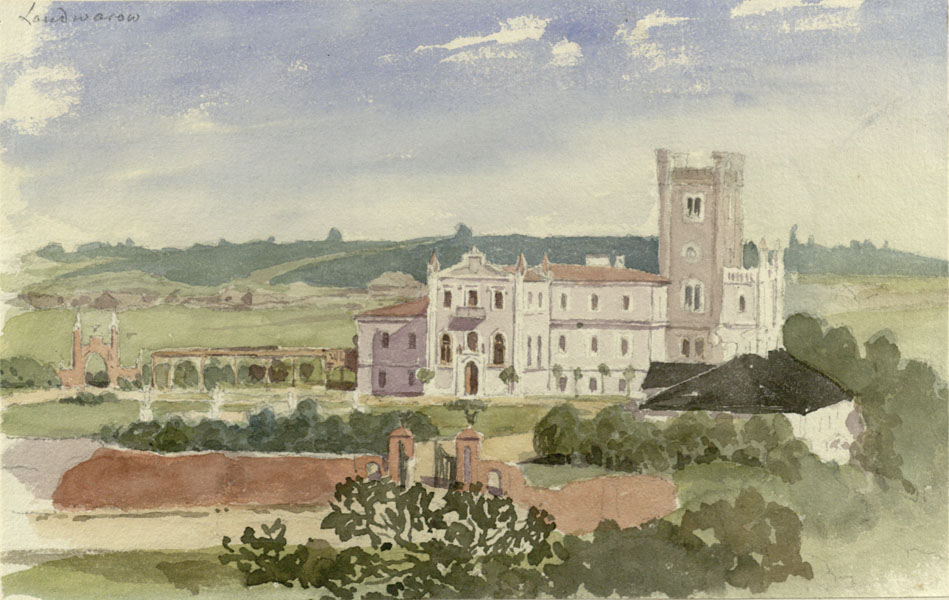
Lentvaris Manor (A. Römer, 1869)

In 1891 Władysław Tyszkiewicz (1865-1936), who inherited the manor, reconstructed the palace, later it acquired the current appearance of English Gothic.

The author of the reconstruction was architect Tadeusz Maria Rostworowski.

The last owner of the manor in 1936. Count Stefan Eugeniusz Tyszkiewicz (1894-1976) became the manor, who ruled the manor until 1939.

Since 1957 the administration of Lentvaris Carpet Factory (now AB Kilimai and UAB Lentvario Kilimai) was located in the manor.

In 2007 the manor was bought by businessman Laimutis Pinkevičius, who went bankrupt in the same year.

In 2016 businessman Ugnius Kiguolis bought the manor from the auction house.

In 2018, the Lentvaris manor house received 673 thousand European Union support for the reconstruction of part of the building.

== Bibliography ==
- Rąkowski, Grzegorz (2017). Kresowe rezydencje. Zamki, pałace i dwory na dawnych ziemiach wschodnich II RP (in Polish). Vol. 1. Warsaw.
