= Lithuanian Theater, Music and Cinema Museum =

Coordinates: 54°40′53″N 25°16′51″E

- Lietuvos teatro, muzikos ir kino muziejus

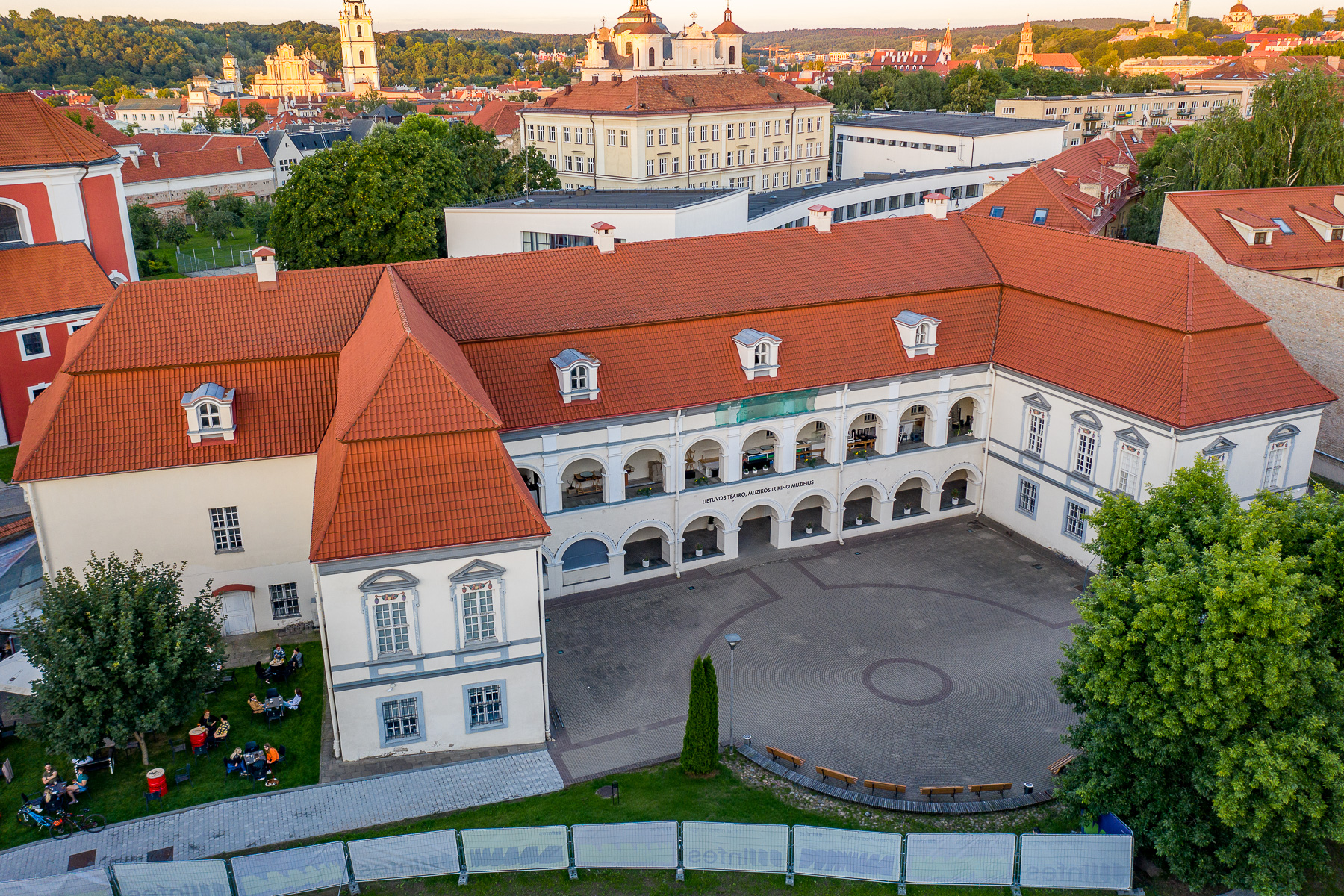
- The museum building, also known as "Radvilas Minor Palace", in Vilnius, Lithuania
- Established: 1926
- Location: Vilniaus str. 41, Vilnius, Lithuania
- Founders: Balys Sruoga and Vincas Krėvė
- Director: Nideta Jarockienė
- Employees: 51 (as of January, 2025)
- Website: lnm.lt

Lithuanian Theater, Music and Cinema Museum (Lithuanian: Lietuvos teatro, muzikos ir kino muziejus) is a museum in Vilnius, Lithuania. that collects, preserves, researches, restores and promotes the works of Lithuanian theatre, music and cinema artists living in Lithuania and abroad, the institution also engages in the promotion of the creative activities of art educational institutions and cultural organisations. It is located in the Minor Radvilos Palace (Lithuanian: Mažieji Radvilų rūmai).

The material stored in the Museum reflects life, creation, and spiritual experience of Lithuanian artists. The Museum accumulates, preserves and examines showpieces related to the history of Lithuanian theatre, music, and cinema, organize evenings in commemoration of artists of these spheres, and exhibitions of collections, conducts exhaustive topical excursions and educational programs, prepare educational publications and consult visitors. Communicating with foreign institutions, international exhibitions are also held there to present significant artists of foreign countries. Furthermore, modern art exhibitions are held there, and summers are especially rich with various events in the amphitheatre of the Museum.

== History ==
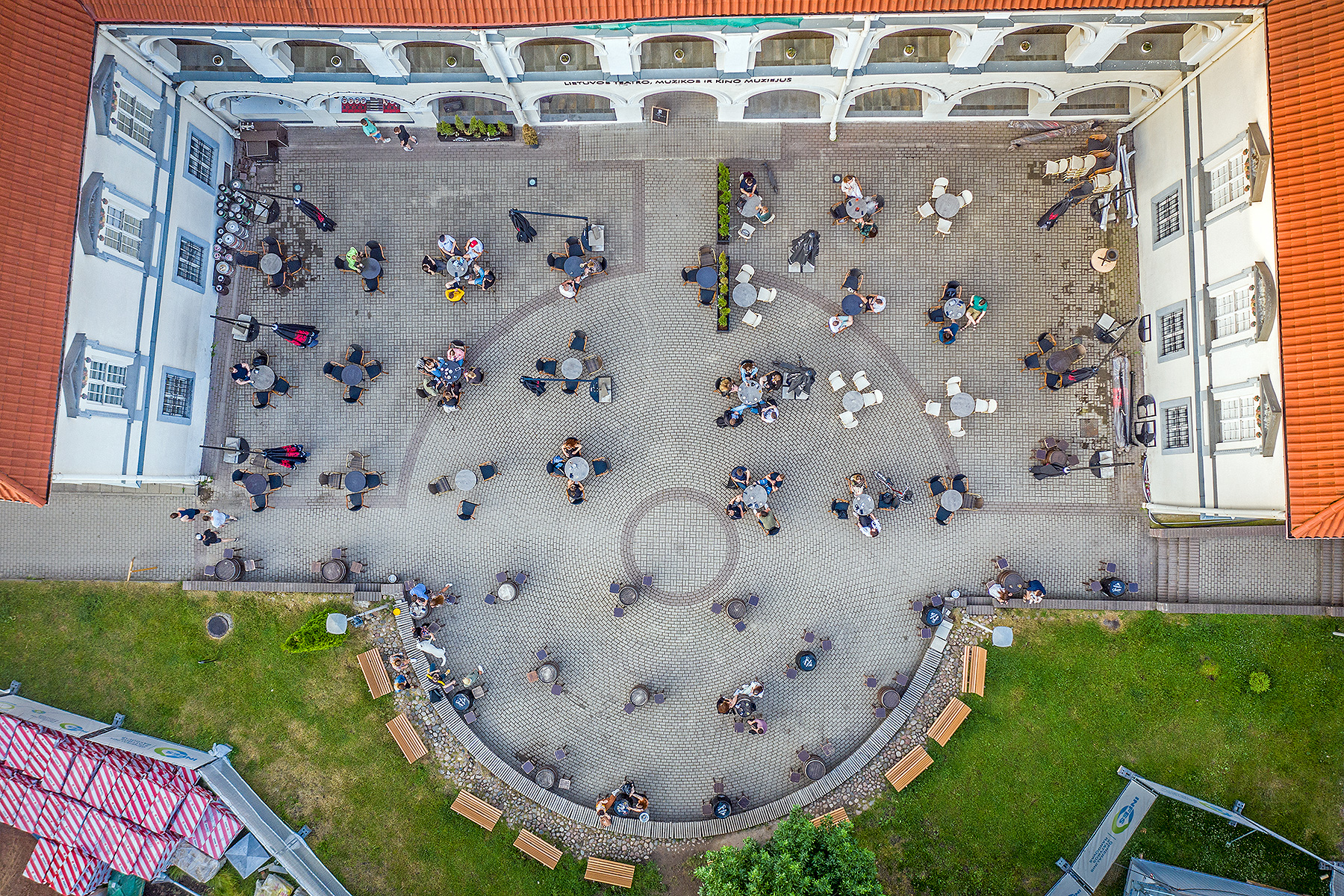
Yard

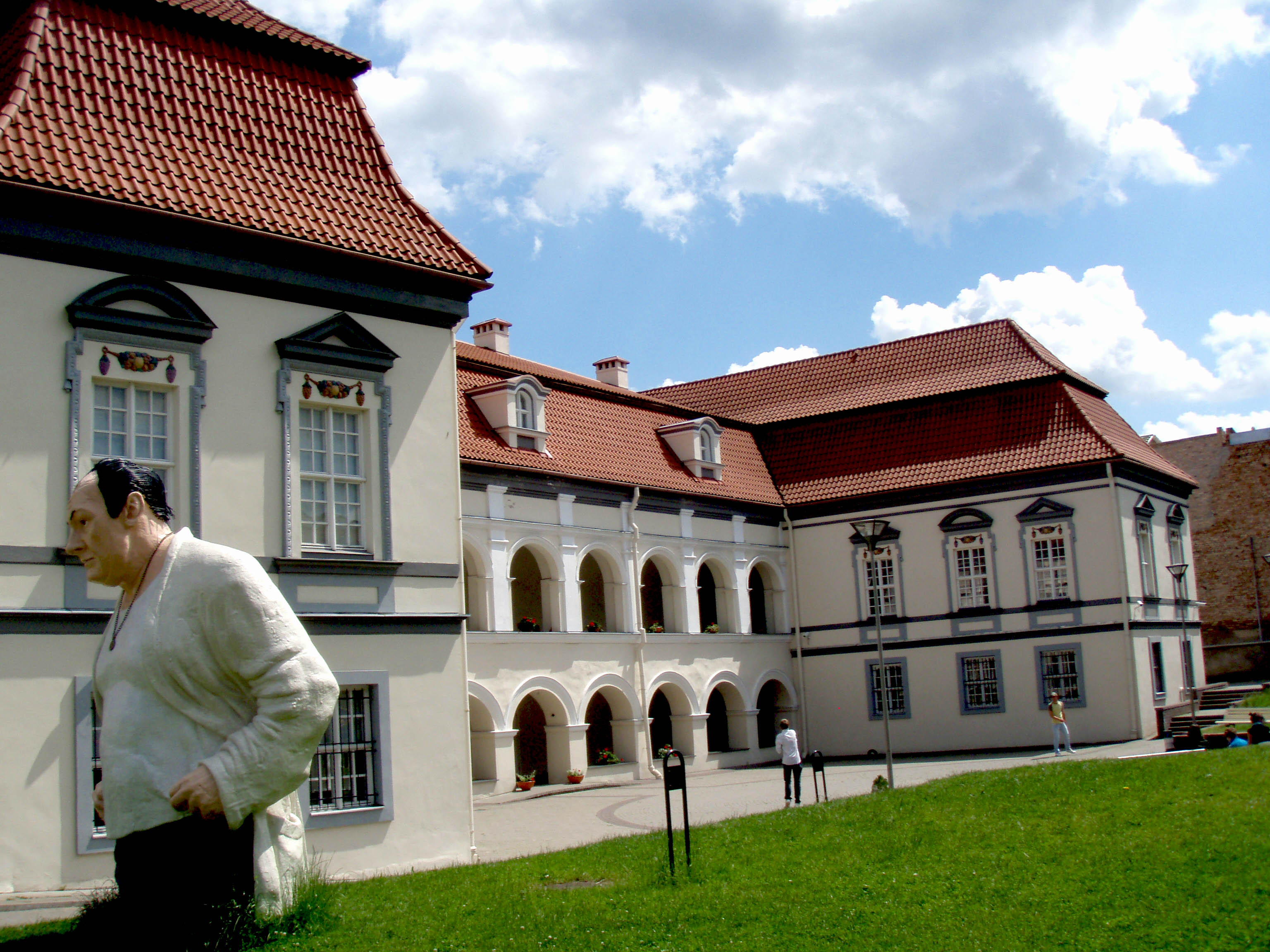
Lithuanian Theater, Music and Cinema Museum in Minor Radvilos Palace

The museum was established in 1926 in Kaunas, on the initiative of Balys Sruoga and Vincas Krėvė. Initially, it was known as the Theatre Seminar Museum of the University of Lithuania, and from 1936 to 1944, it was referred to as the State Theatre Museum. During the period of World War II, the museum's activities were suspended. Since then, the museum has undergone numerous name changes. Between 1957 and 1964, it was known as the Museum of the Lithuanian Theatre Society (Actors' House). From 1964 until 1992, it was designated the Theatre and Music Department of the Lithuanian Art Museum. Finally, from 1992 onwards, it took on its current name, the Lithuanian Theatre, Music and Film Museum. In 1996, the museum was relocated to the restored Radvilas Minor Palace in Vilnius, and in 2000, a permanent exhibition was inaugurated. The museum organises approximately 15 individual exhibitions annually (including exhibitions in other cultural institutions), approximately 30 meetings, cultural evenings, concerts and conferences. Additionally, around 10,000 new exhibits are added each year (in 2007, the museum had 258,120 exhibits). The museum also publishes exhibition catalogues, theatre programme directories, documents found in the collections, and articles in the press on various issues related to the history of theatre, music and film.
