= Raguvėlė =

- Village
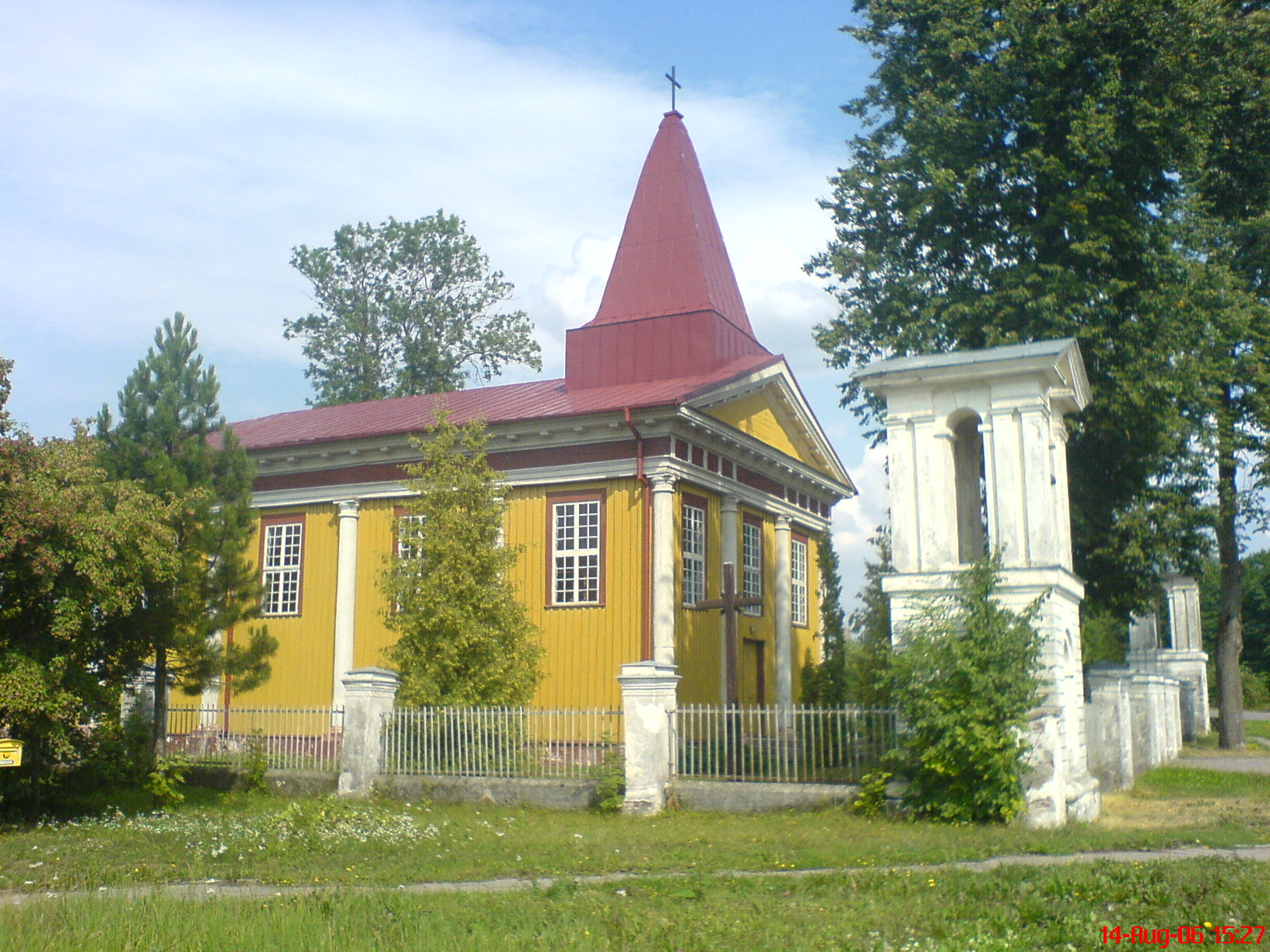
- Church of Raguvėlė

- Location within Lithuania
- Coordinates: 55°39′20″N 24°39′50″E
- Country: Lithuania
- County: Utena County
- Municipality: Anykščiai

Population (2011)
  - Total: 314
- Time zone: UTC+2 (EET)
  - Summer (DST): UTC+3 (EEST)

Raguvėlė is a village in Anykščiai district municipality, in Utena County, in northeast Lithuania. According to the 2011 census, the village had a population of 314 people. It is established near Juosta river.

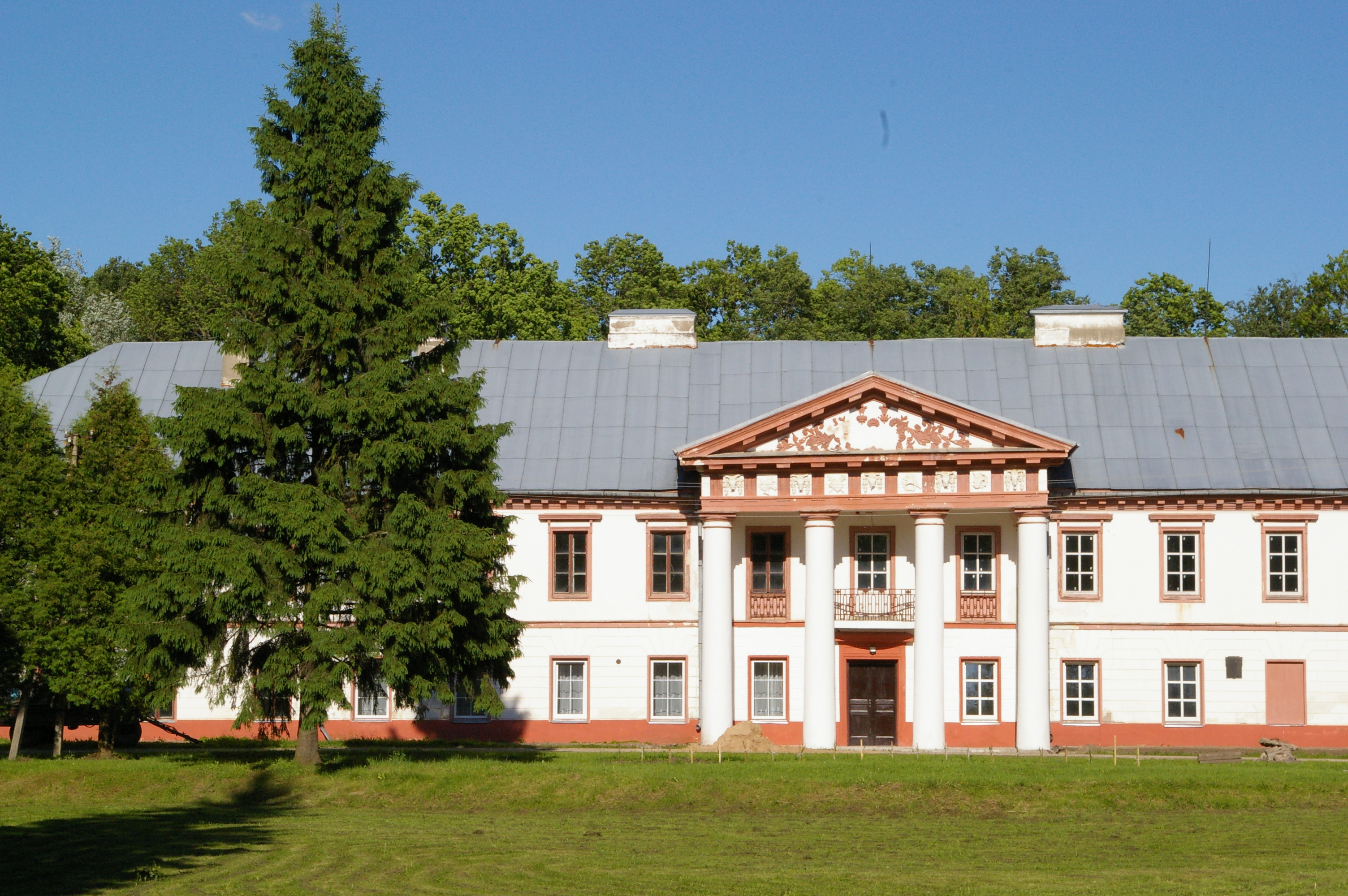
Raguvėlė Manor

== Education ==
- Raguvėlė primary school
