= Minor Radvilos Palace =

Palace in Vilnius, Lithuania

- Mažieji Radvilų rūmai
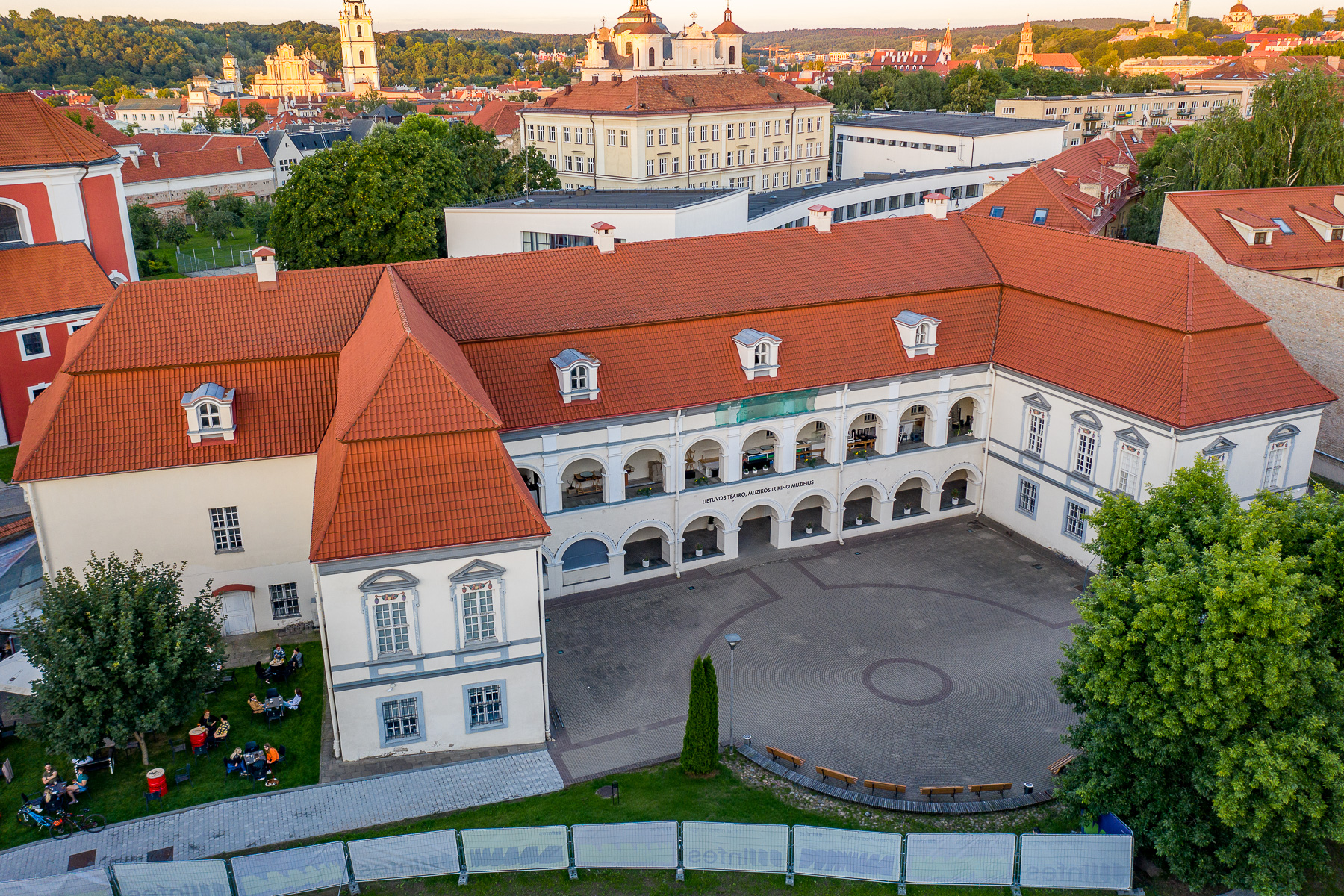

General information
- Status: Currently used as Lithuanian Theater, Music and Cinema Museum
- Type: Palace
- Architectural style: Renaissance, Baroque
- Location: Vilnius, Lithuania
- Address: Vilniaus st. 41
- Coordinates: 54°40′53″N 25°16′51″E
- Groundbreaking: 17th century
- Inaugurated: 17th century
- Renovated: 1796–1810, 1987–1989

Technical details
- Material: Masonry (brick), stones, wood
- Floor count: 2
- Floor area: 5,809 m^{2} (62,530 sq ft)

Design and construction
- Architect(s): Costante Tencalla (17th century project), Pietro de Rossi (1796–1810 reconstruction), Giedrė Juknevičienė (1987–1989 project)

Website
- www.ltmkm.lt

Minor Radvilos Palace (Lithuanian: Mažieji Radvilų rūmai; Polish: Mały Pałac Radziwiłłów) is a former palace of the Radziwiłł family in Vilnius, Lithuania. The palace was originally built in the 17th century and was reconstructed twice in 1796–1810 and 1987–1989. Currently, it houses the Lithuanian Theater, Music and Cinema Museum.
