= Church of the Immaculate Conception, Alsėdžiai =

Church building complex in Lithuania

Alsėdžiai Church Building Complex of the Immaculate Conception of the Holy Virgin Mary
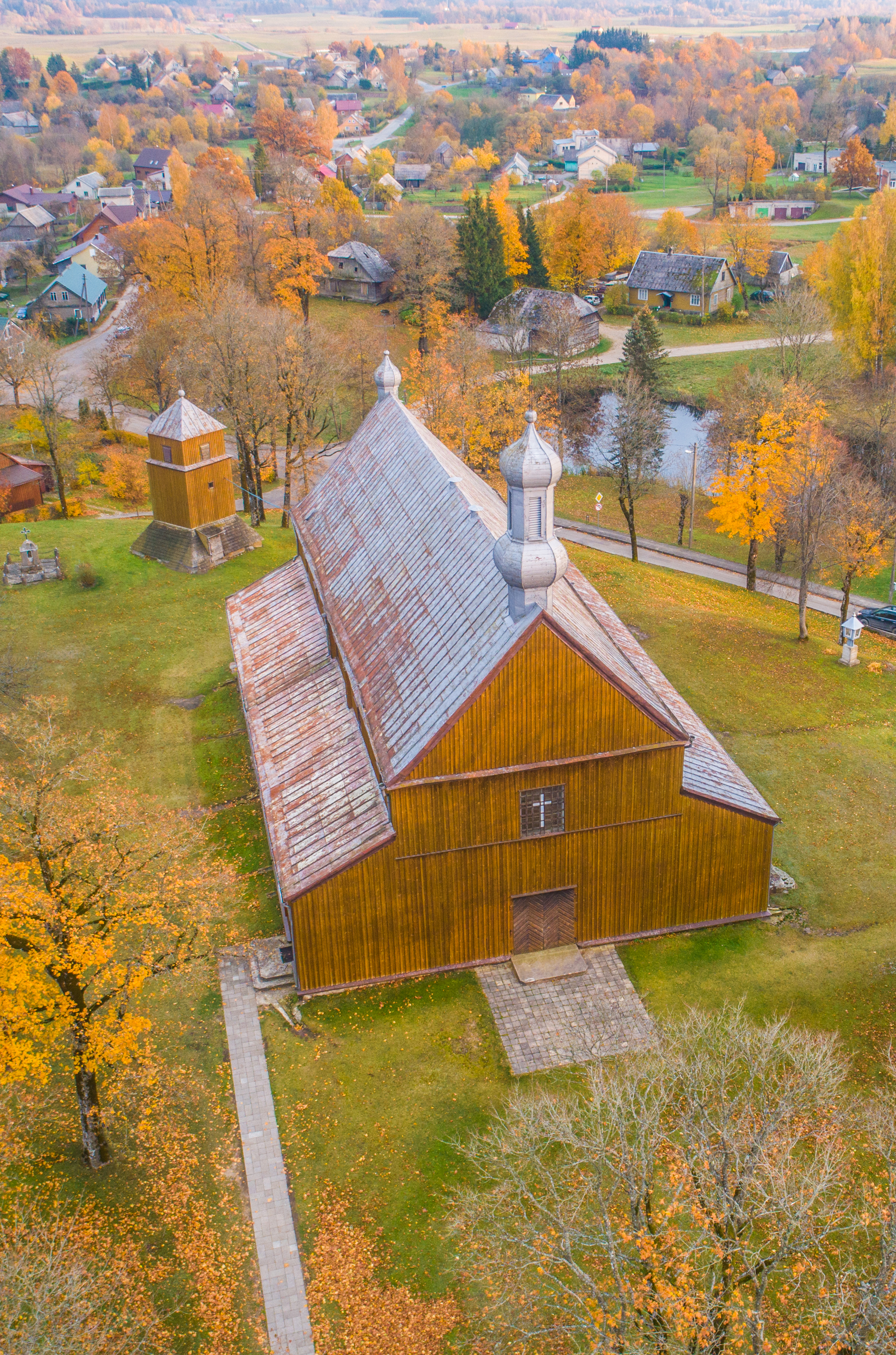
- Interactive map of the Alsėdžiai Church Building Complex of the Immaculate Conception of the Holy Virgin Mary area

General information
- Location: Alsėdžiai, Lithuania
- Coordinates: 56.030324°N 22.045994°E

Website
- www.

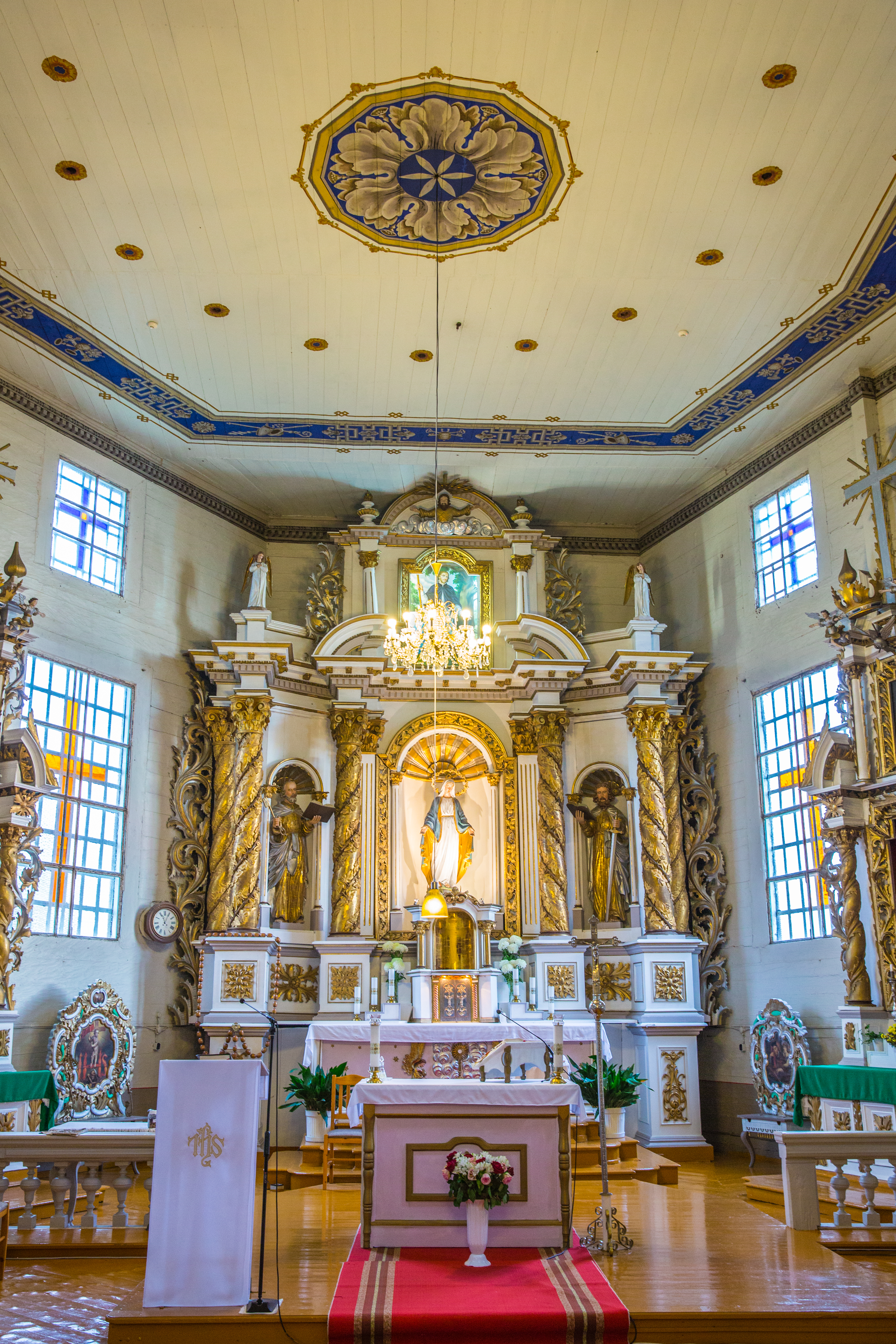
The interior of the church

In 1421–1842, Alsėdžiai belonged to the Samogitian bishops, and from 1465 it became their permanent residence. The first church in Alsėdžiai was built in the 14th century. However, neither the original church nor the one that was built in the 17th century have survived to this day.

The present-day Church of the Immaculate Conception of the Holy Virgin Mary was built in 1793, along with a chapel situated on the site of the old church.

== Architecture ==
The Church of the Immaculate Conception of the Holy Virgin Mary is a basilica style church, while its wooden structure is of a characteristically Samogitian pyramid shape. The roof of its central nave is large, double-sided and three-sided above the apse. At the apex of the pediment there are two rounded turrets, with tin covered elements and a cross. The central altar and two smaller side altars in the apses are wooden and Baroque in form with spiral columns. There are also seven culturally significant altars that are decorated with wooden carvings and small paintings. Near the church there is an 18th-century wooden bell tower. A chapel built in Alsėdžiai in the middle of the 19th century features a rectangular plan, with a three-walled apse oriented towards the east. Unusually, the entryway is not at the front but is rather on the northern façade. The size, plan and capacity of the structure are typical for a Samogitian chapel; however, the architectural forms and the interior décor are exceptionally modest.

== Gallery ==
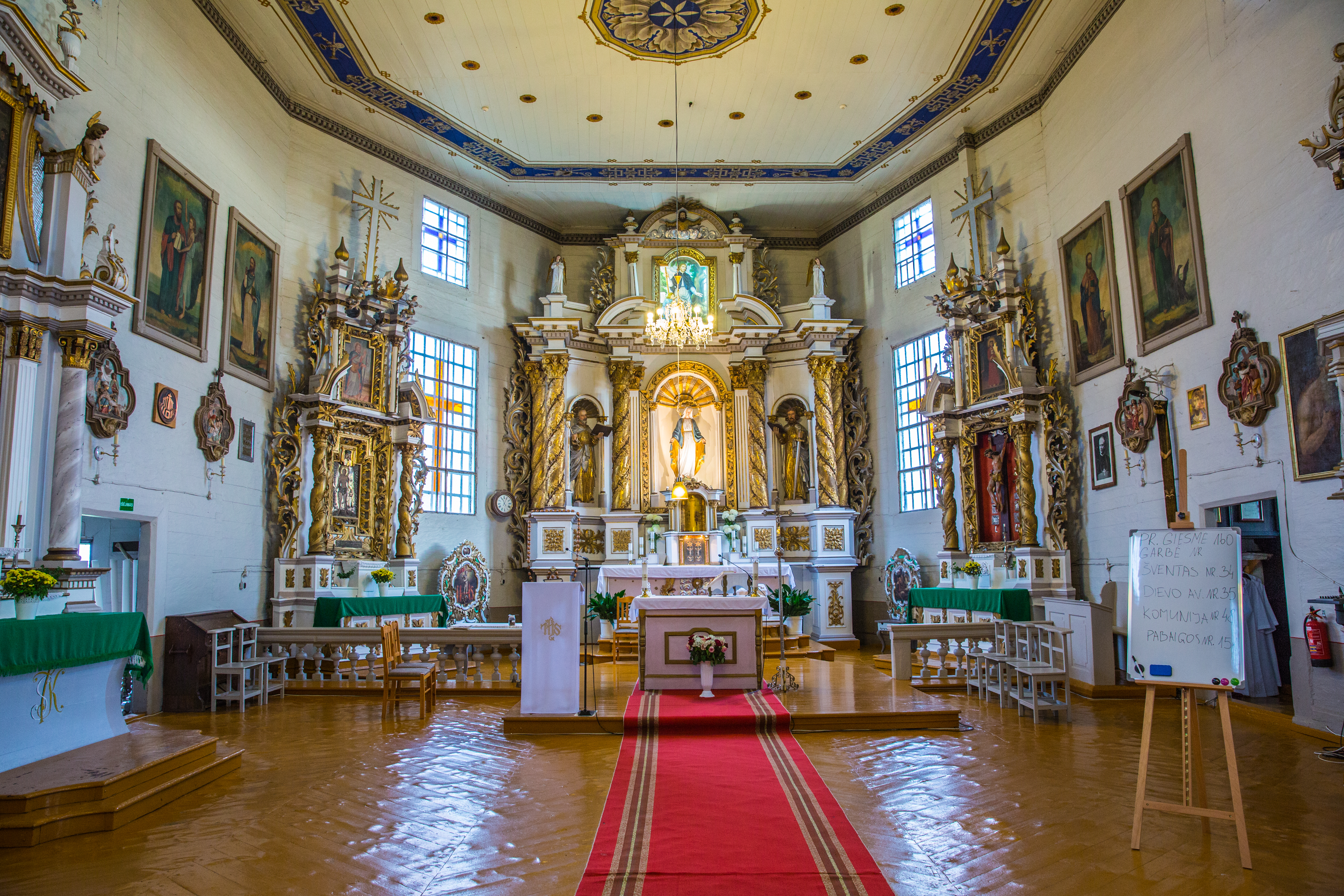

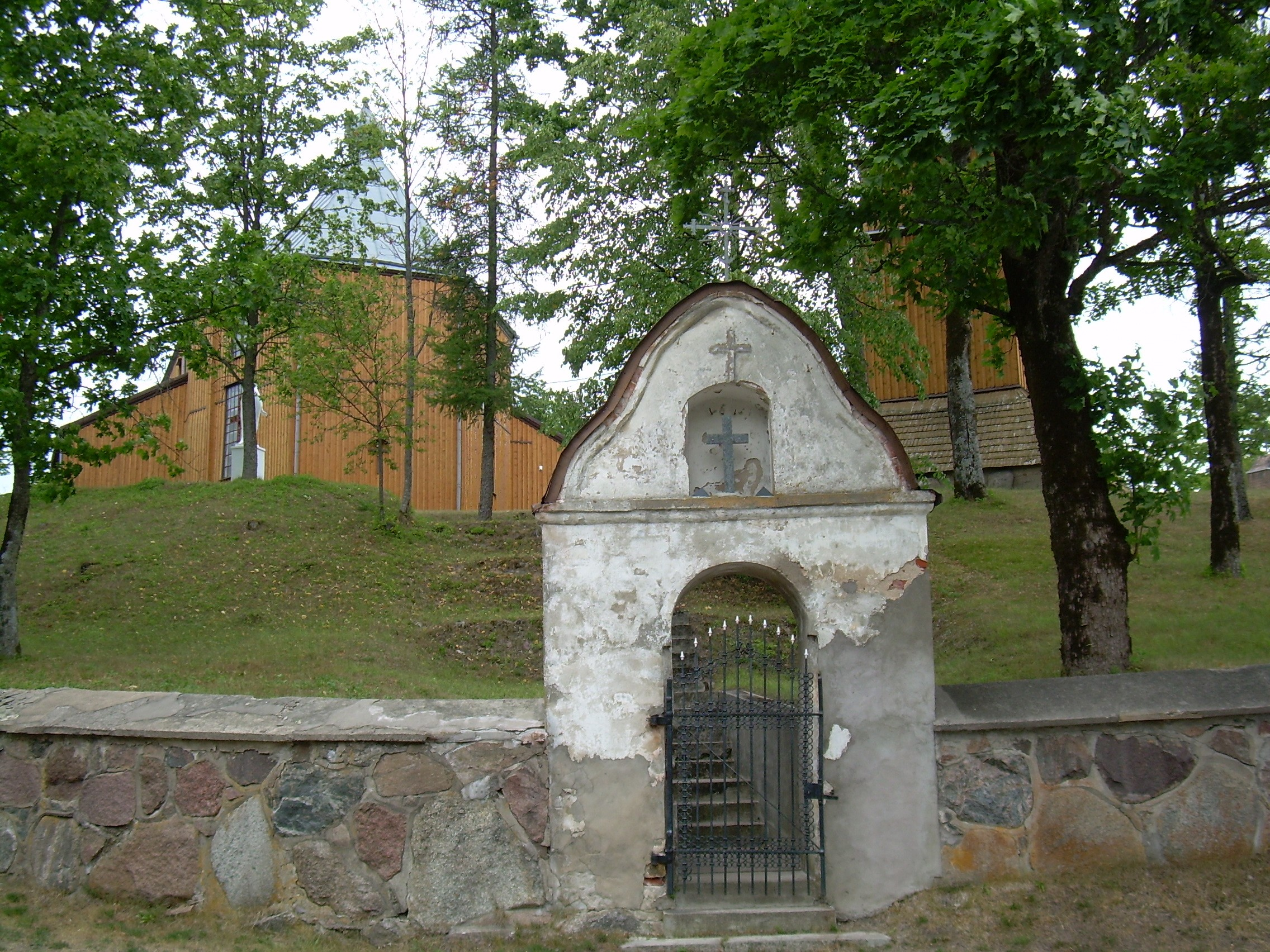

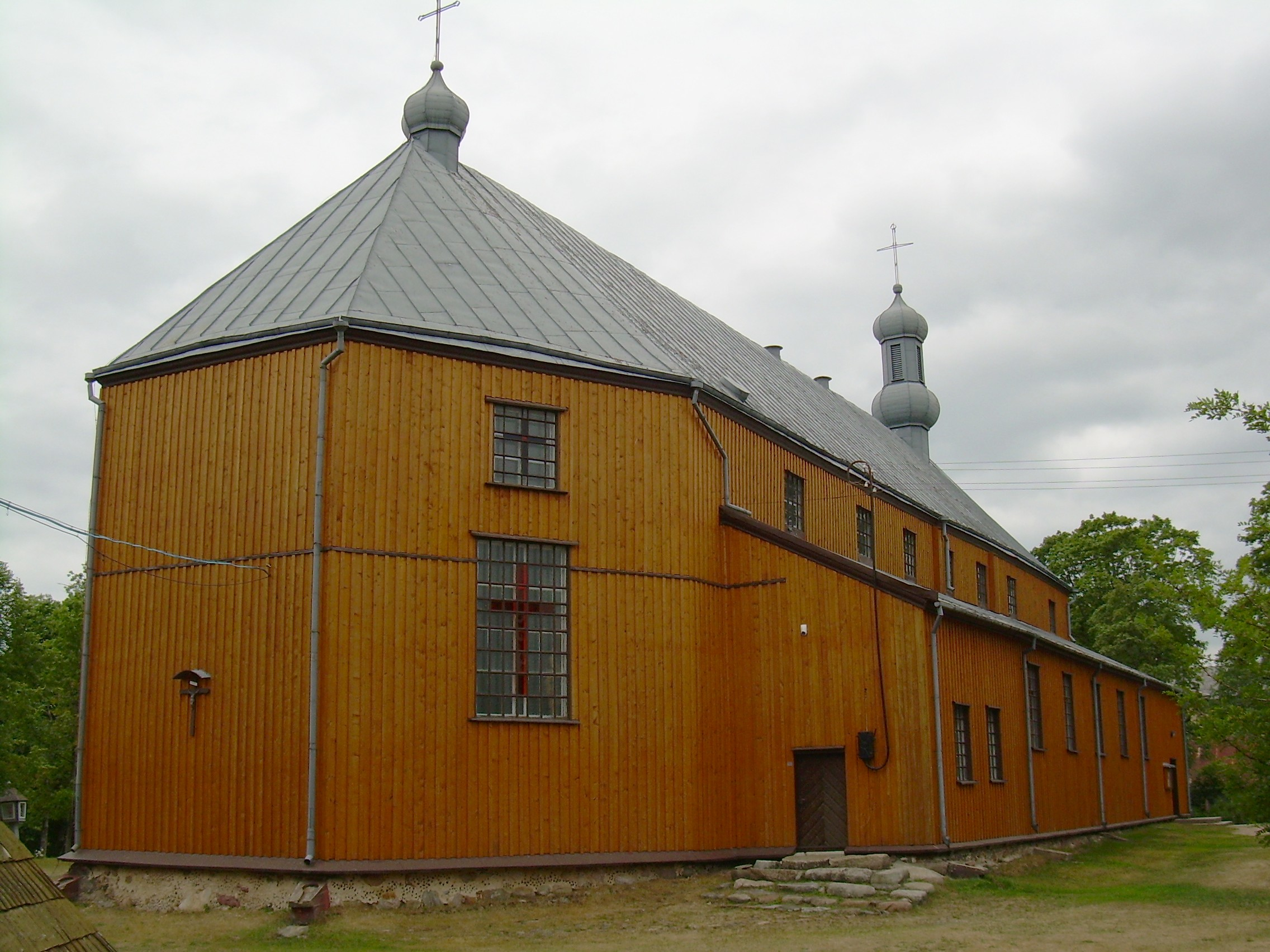

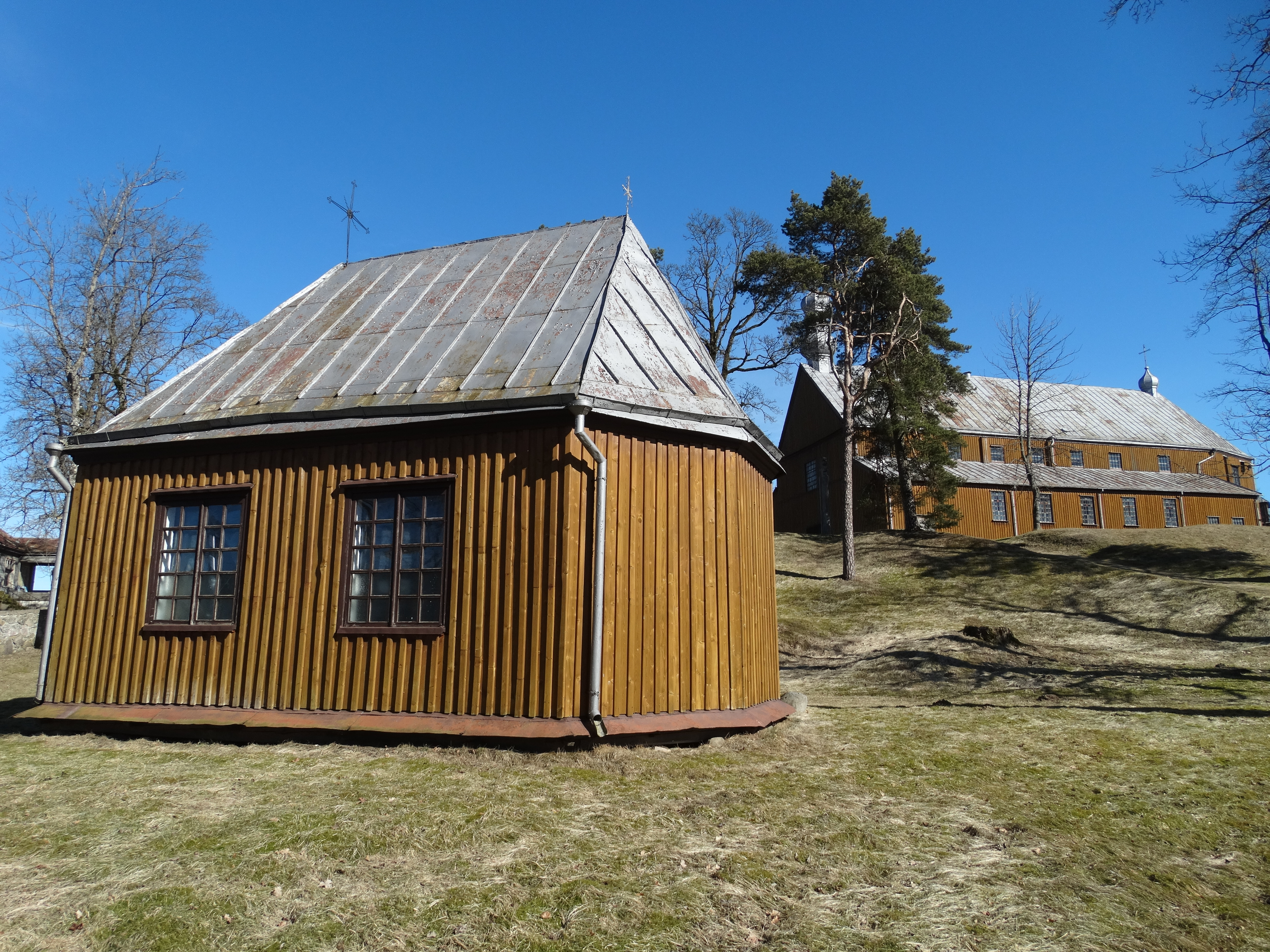

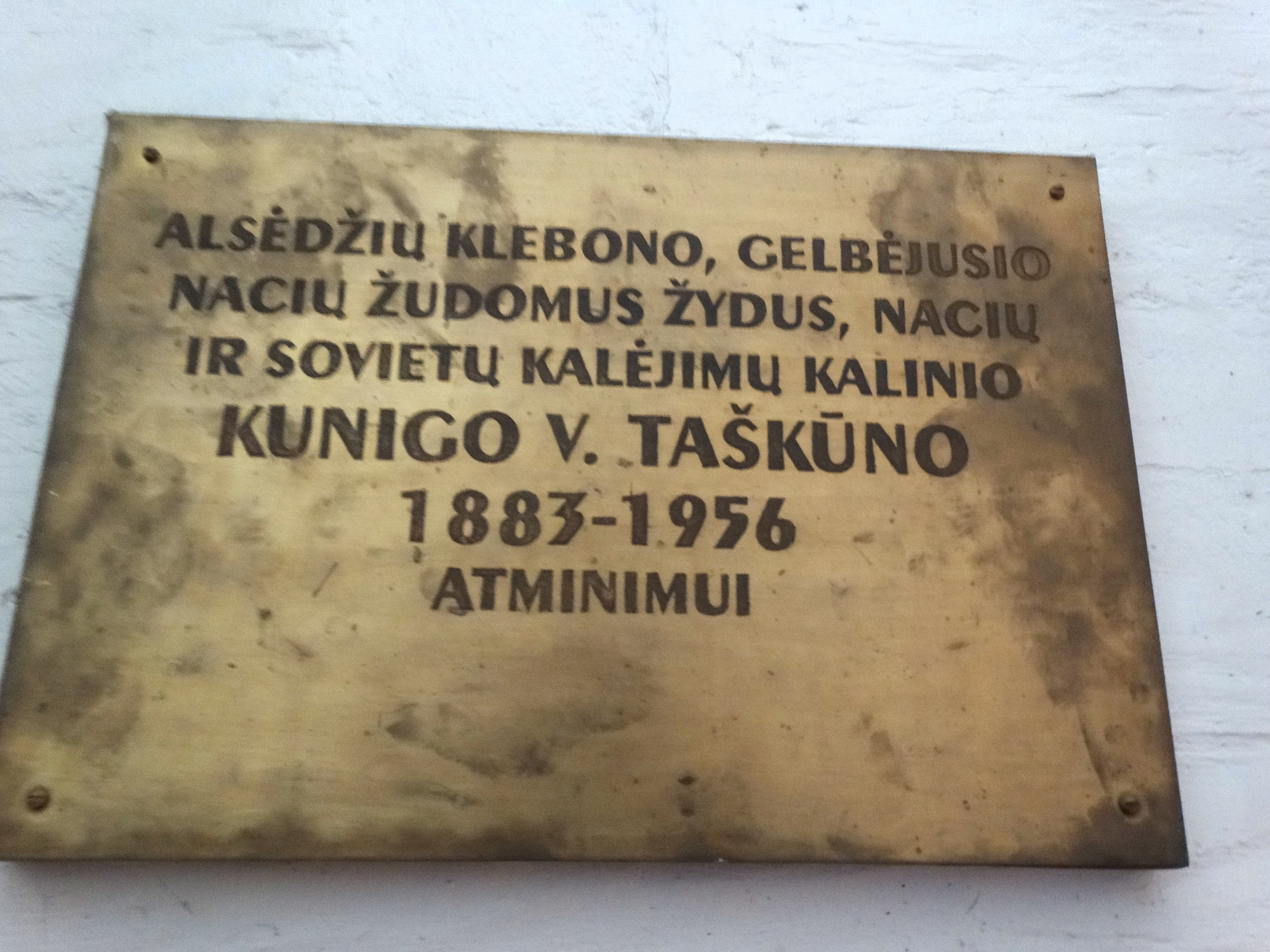

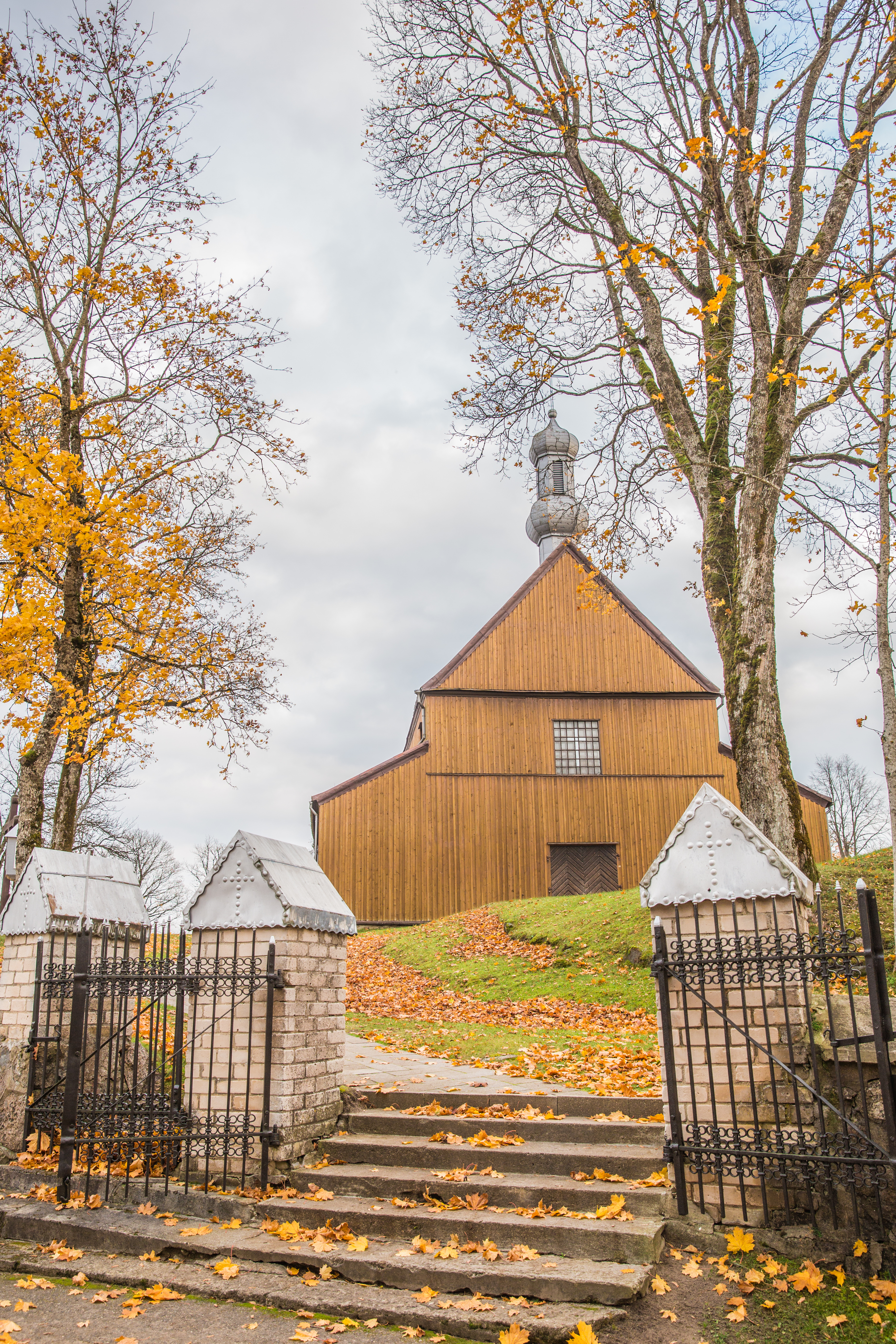

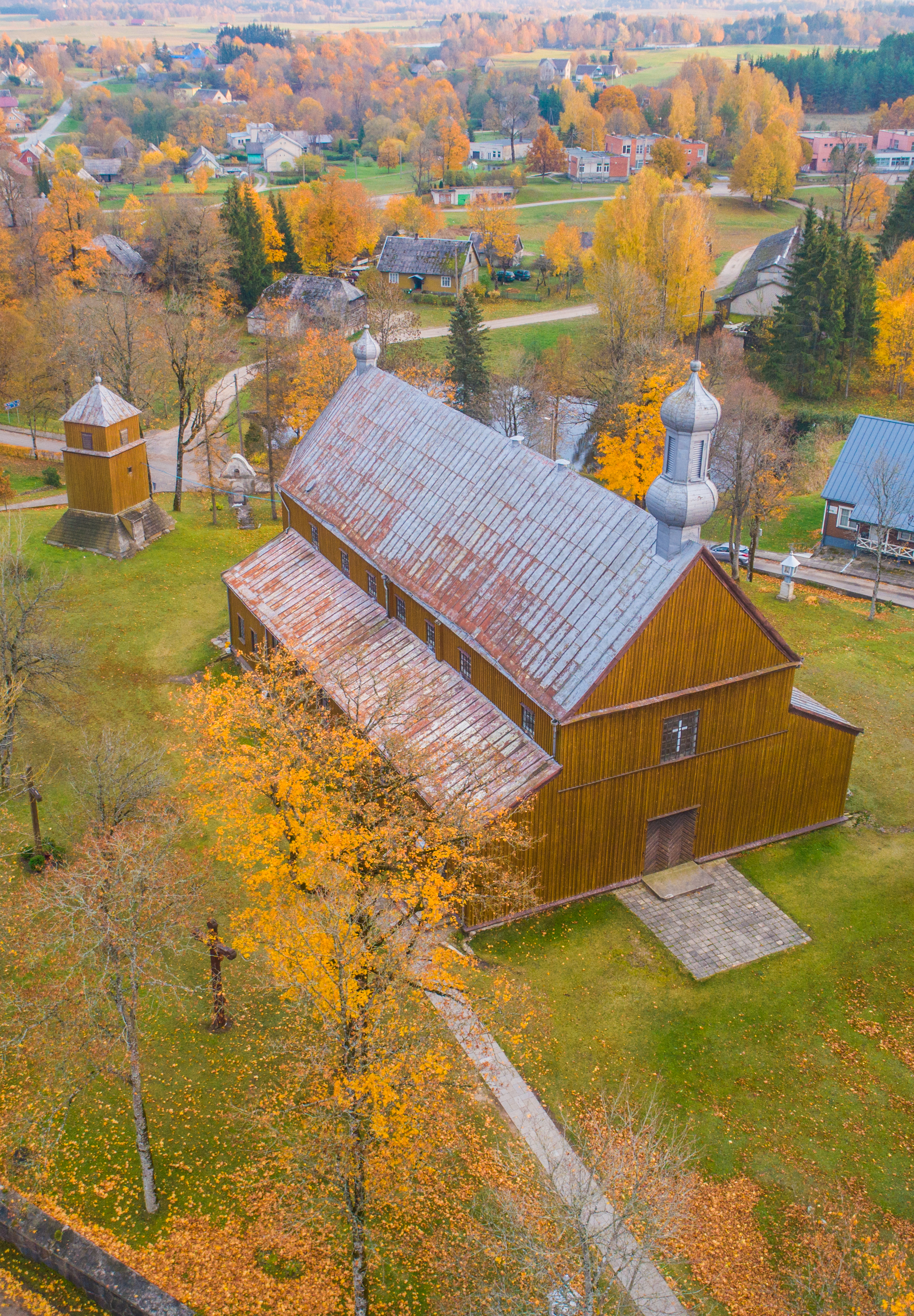

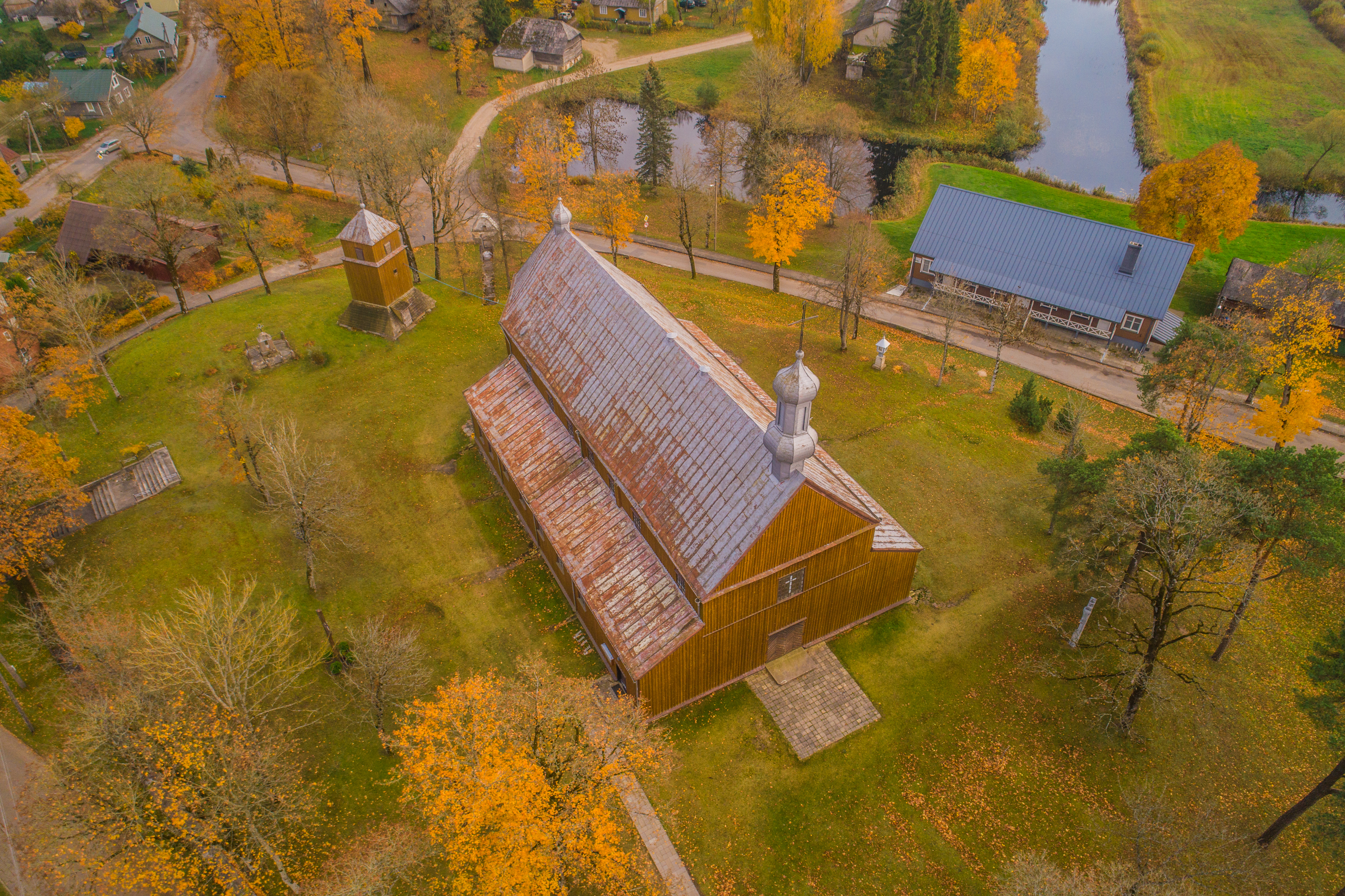
