= Raguvėlė Manor =

Manor in Anykščiai district, Lithuania

Coordinates: 55°39′20″N 24°40′8″E

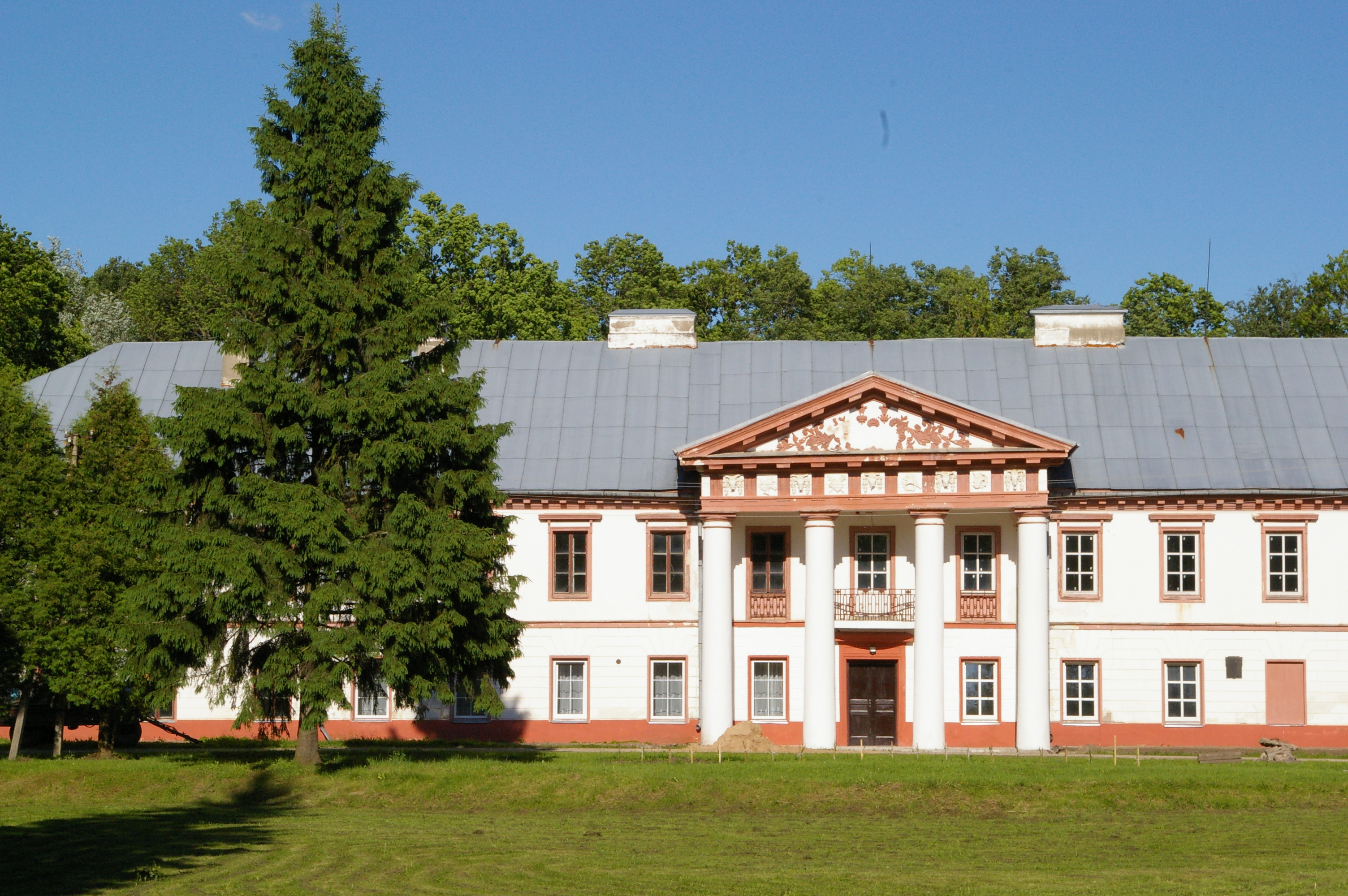
Raguvėlė Manor (2010)

Raguvėlė Manor (or Komarai Manor) is a former residential manor in Raguvėlė village, Anykščiai district.

One of the largest manor complexes in Lithuania consists of 19 buildings. Raguvėlė was owned by the Komarai family from the 18th century. The main building of the complex is a palace built in the 18th century and rebuilt in the late Neoclassical style in 1840–50 by Józef Komar and his son Konstanty.

The last owner of the palace from the Komarai was Władysław Komar, who, after moving to Raguvėlė in the 1930s, represented Lithuania in the international athletics competitions. Komar joined the Polish Union of Armed Struggle in 1939, later called the Home Army from 1942. During the German occupation of Lithuania during World War II, Władysław was the deputy head of the Landbewirstschaftungsgesellschaft Ostland for the Vilnius district. He was killed in 1944 during the Glinciszki massacre by the Ypatingasis būrys. His wife and children fled to Poland in 1945. His son, also named Władysław, became an Olympic champion in shot put in 1972.

After the war, various schools were housed in the palace, and the farm buildings were used by the kolkhoz. In 1992, the palace complex was returned to the heirs. Its current official owner is Akvilina Rimševičienė, who is related to the Komar family.
