= Aleksandr Smetanov =

Russian politician

Deputy of the Moscow City Duma of the VI convocation
- Incumbent
- Assumed office 14 September 2014
- Constituency: Moscow

Member of all-Russian political party United Russia

Personal details
- Born: Aleksandr Yuryevich Smetanov; 11 May 1962 (age 64) Moscow, Russia
- Citizenship: Russian Federation
- Party: United Russia
- Education: Moscow Polytechnic University
- Occupation: Politician, deputy of the moscow city duma

Aleksandr Yuryevich Smetanov (Russian: Александр Юрьевич Сметанов; born 11 May 1962, Moscow) is a Russian politician and statesman, and since 14 September 2014, a Moscow City Duma deputy of the 6th convocation from the United Russia party. He is a former doctor of economic Sciences.

== Biography ==
In the period from 1981 to 2001, he served in the KGB and FSB.

Since 2002 he was General Director of scientific production enterprise "Sapphire".

In 2006, the cosmonautics Federation of Russia for the establishment of space systems and their component parts has the honorary title "Honored Creator of space technology".

In 2013, the President of the Russian Federation awarded him with the medal of the order Order "For Merit to the Fatherland" II degree.

He was awarded medals "For distinction in Military service" III degree, "50 years of strategic missile forces", "50 years of space era".

He was a professor at Moscow Polytechnic University.

== Scandals and accidents ==
In 2016, Alexander Smetanov went to the police with a request to check the financial activities of the organization Dissernet working to find plagiarism in scientific papers officials. He was subsequently stripped of the academic degree of Doctor of Economic Sciences by the Higher Attestation Commission for plagiarism in his doctoral dissertation.

== Publications and publishing ==
- Newspaper Petrovka 38. Room 5 (9557) from 14 February 2017, Officially, the Word Deputy.
- The Newspaper Evening Moscow from 15 July 2016.
- Family club Perovo from 19 April 2017.
- Newspaper FAIR.RU from 7 July 2016.
