= Department of Cultural Heritage =

Organization in Vilnius, Lithuania

- Kultūros paveldo departamentas

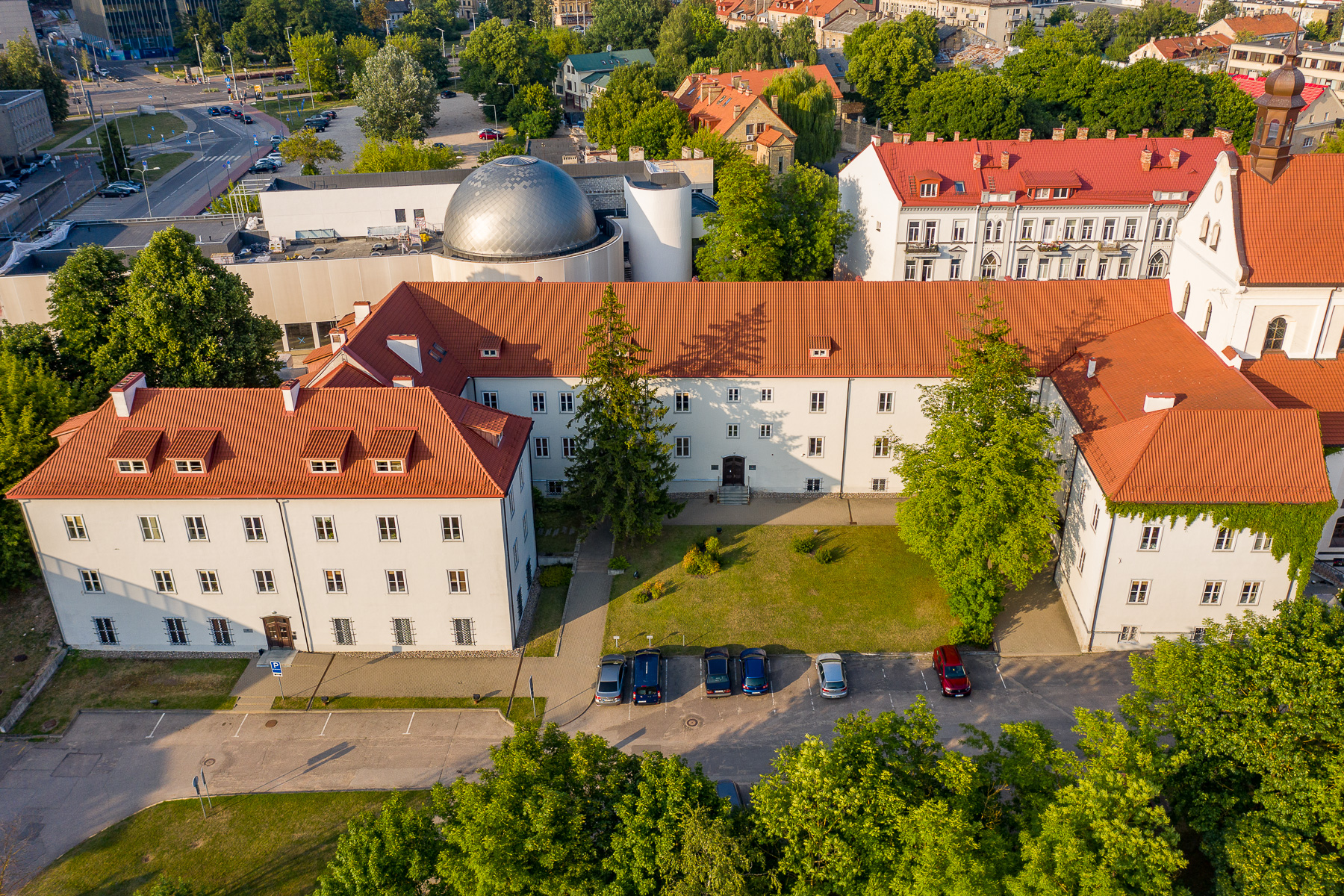
- Headquarters of the Department of Cultural Heritage

Department overview
- Formed: Original: 1919; Current: 1 March 1994; 32 years ago
- Jurisdiction: Lithuania
- Headquarters: Šnipiškių g. 3, Vilnius, Lithuania
- Employees: 161
- Department executive: Vidmantas Bezaras, Director
- Parent Ministry: Ministry of Culture
- Website: kpd.lrv.lt

The Department of Cultural Heritage (Lithuanian: Kultūros paveldo departamentas KPD) is the department of the Lithuanian Ministry of Culture responsible for protecting and documenting cultural property as well as the intangible cultural heritage.

The Department of Cultural Heritage performs the functions entrusted to it by laws and regulations for the protection of immovable cultural heritage and movable cultural property: it oversees and manages cultural property, maintains records, supervises and controls cultural heritage sites, presents cultural heritage to the public, and contributes to the development and implementation of the national policy for historic preservation.

The department maintains and compiles the Registry of Cultural Property list.

The department coordinates the European Heritage Days in Lithuania, as well as researches heritage preservation.

== History ==
After the restoration of an independent Lithuania, systematic protection of objects of cultural heritage was initiated in 1919 when the State Archaeological Commission was established. In 1936, after the adoption of the Law on the Vytautas the Great Museum of Culture, the office of the Conservator of Monuments of Lithuania was created. In 1940, the Office for the Protection of Cultural Monuments was established to take inventory of cultural property in nationalised estates and hand it over to museums; however, the outbreak of World War II stopped its activities.

In 1961, the first list of architectural monuments of national importance was approved, and in 1972, lists of archaeological, historical, architectural, urban planning, and fine arts monuments of national and local importance were approved, comprising almost 10,000 objects.

In 1967, the Scientific Methodological Council for the Protection of Cultural Monuments was established, heritage inspectorates were set up in Vilnius, Kaunas, and Klaipėda, and since 1975 every district has had a heritage conservation officer.

In 1990, the Supreme Council – Reconstituent Seimas adopted the Provisional Law on the Inspectorate of Cultural Heritage Protection; the Inspectorate of Cultural Heritage Protection was established and the Department of Heritage Management was created. In 1994, the Inspectorate of Cultural Heritage of the Republic of Lithuania and the Department of Heritage Management were reorganised, and the Department of the Protection of Cultural Values was established (since 2005 - the Department of Cultural Heritage).
