= Aukštoji Freda Manor =

Coordinates: 54°52′18″N 23°54′40″E

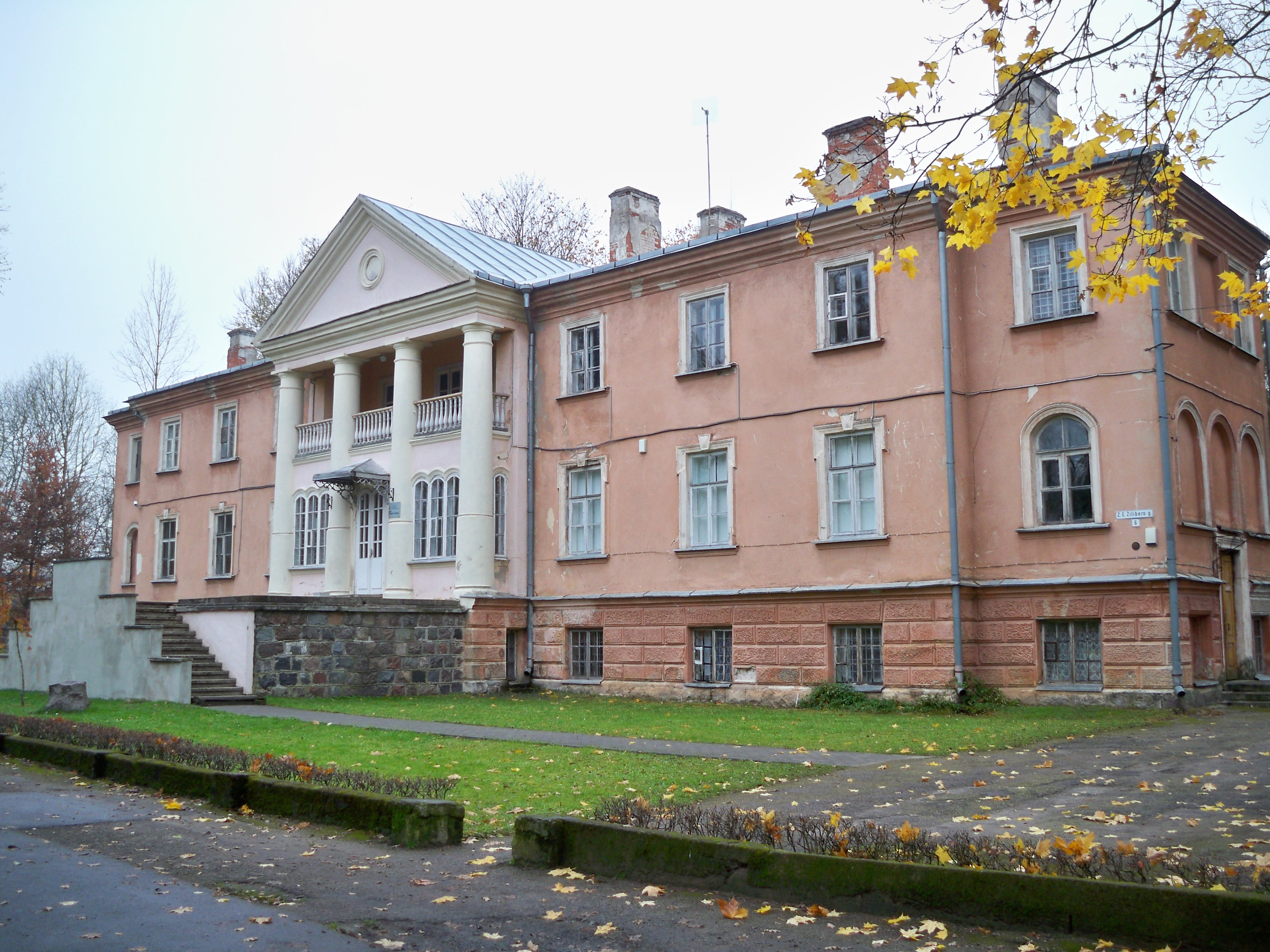
Aukštoji Freda Manor (2011)

Aukštoji Freda Manor (English: The High Freda Manor) is a former residential manor in Freda, Kaunas.

It is located right next to the Vytautas Magnus University Botanical Garden.

== Gallery ==
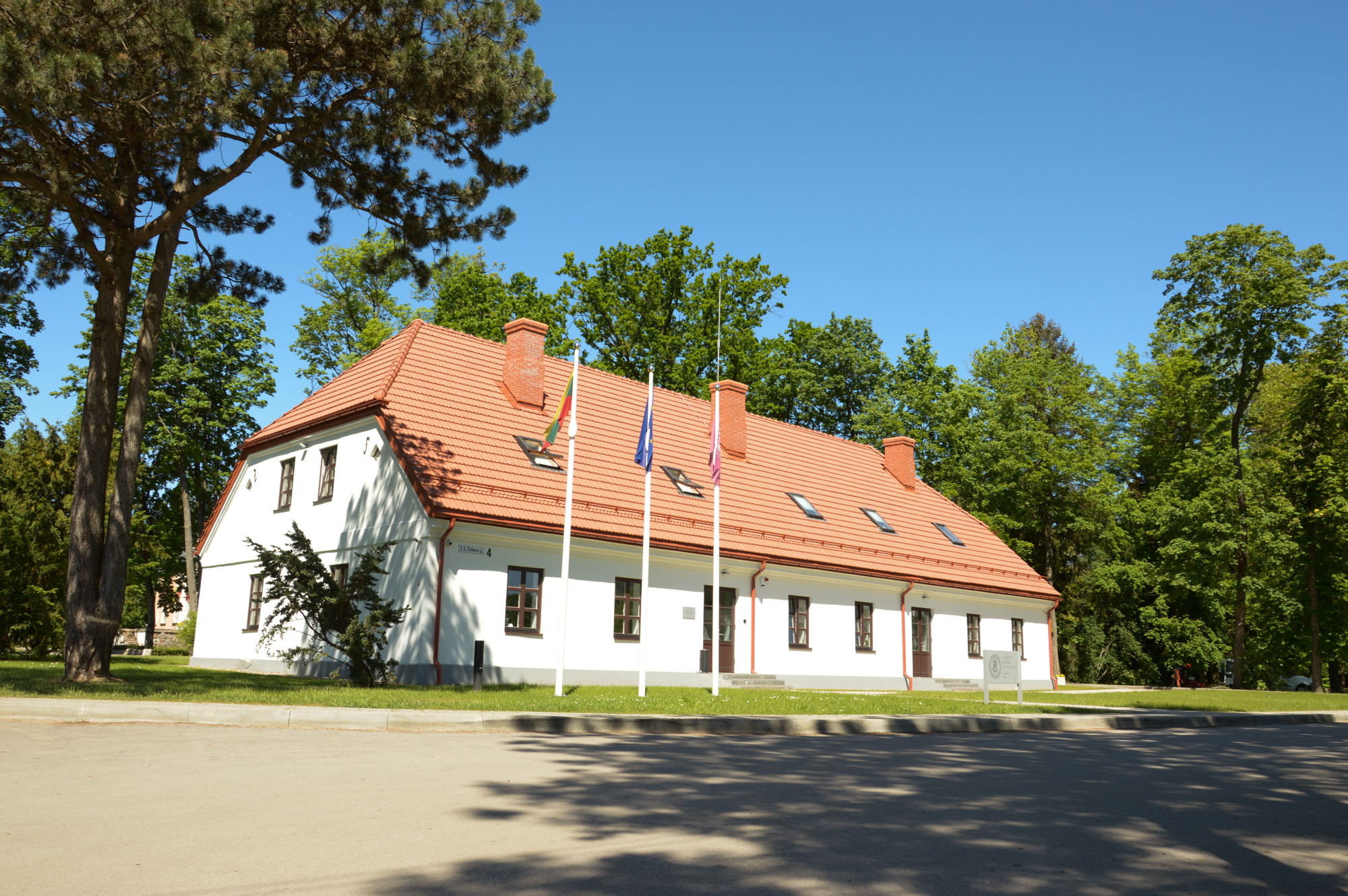
Oficina (servants' residential house)

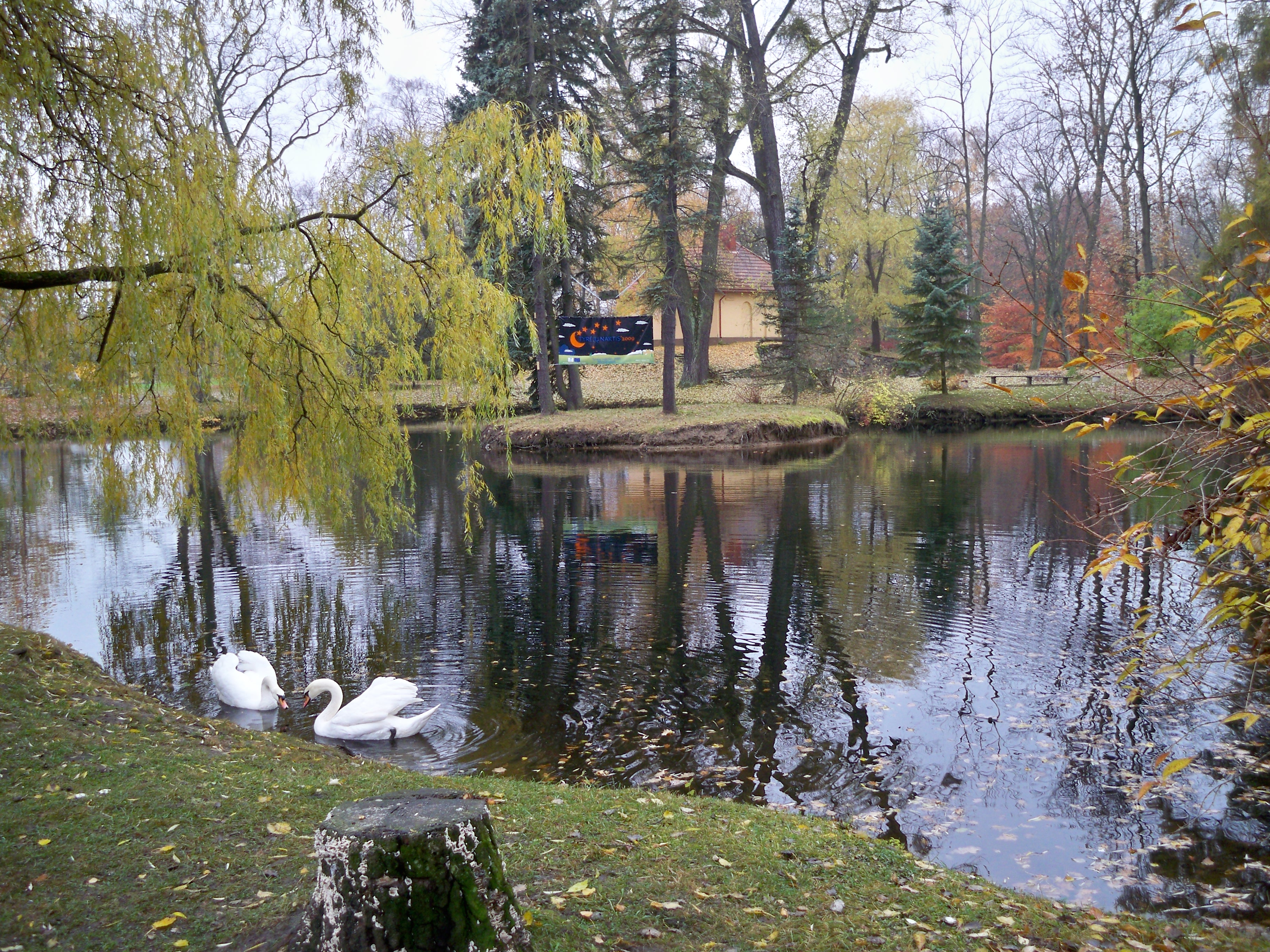
Botanical garden pond

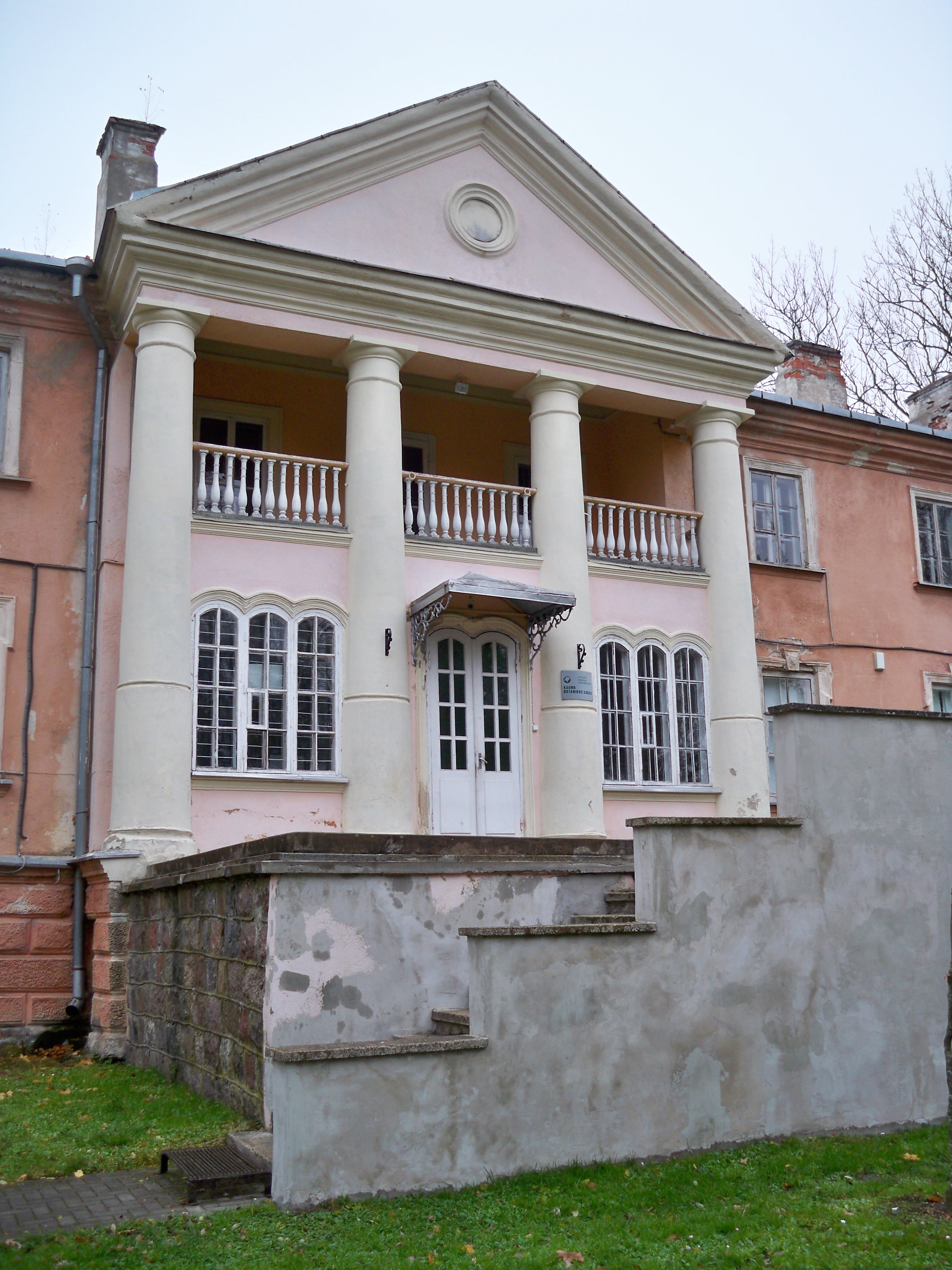

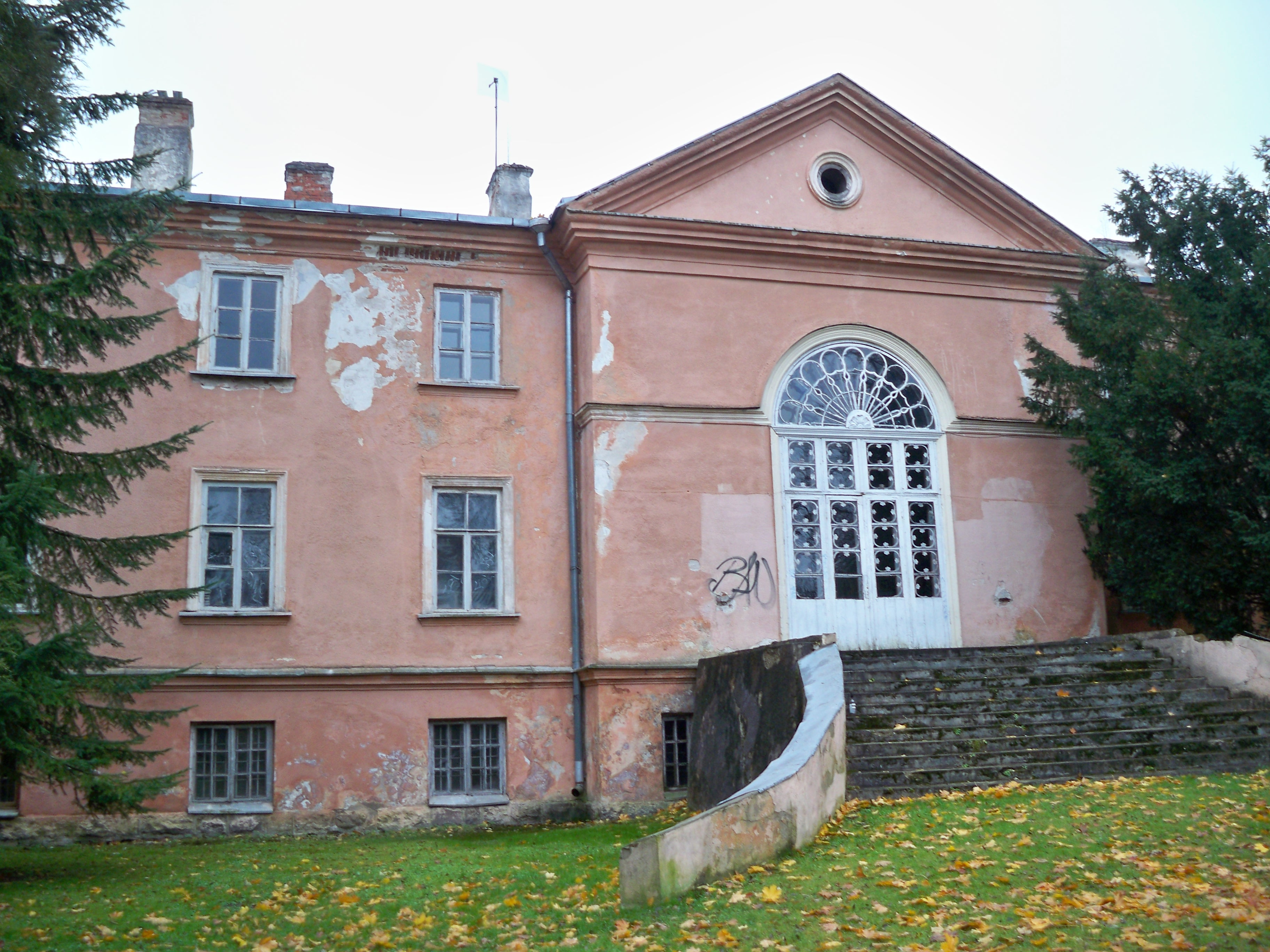
The northern facade

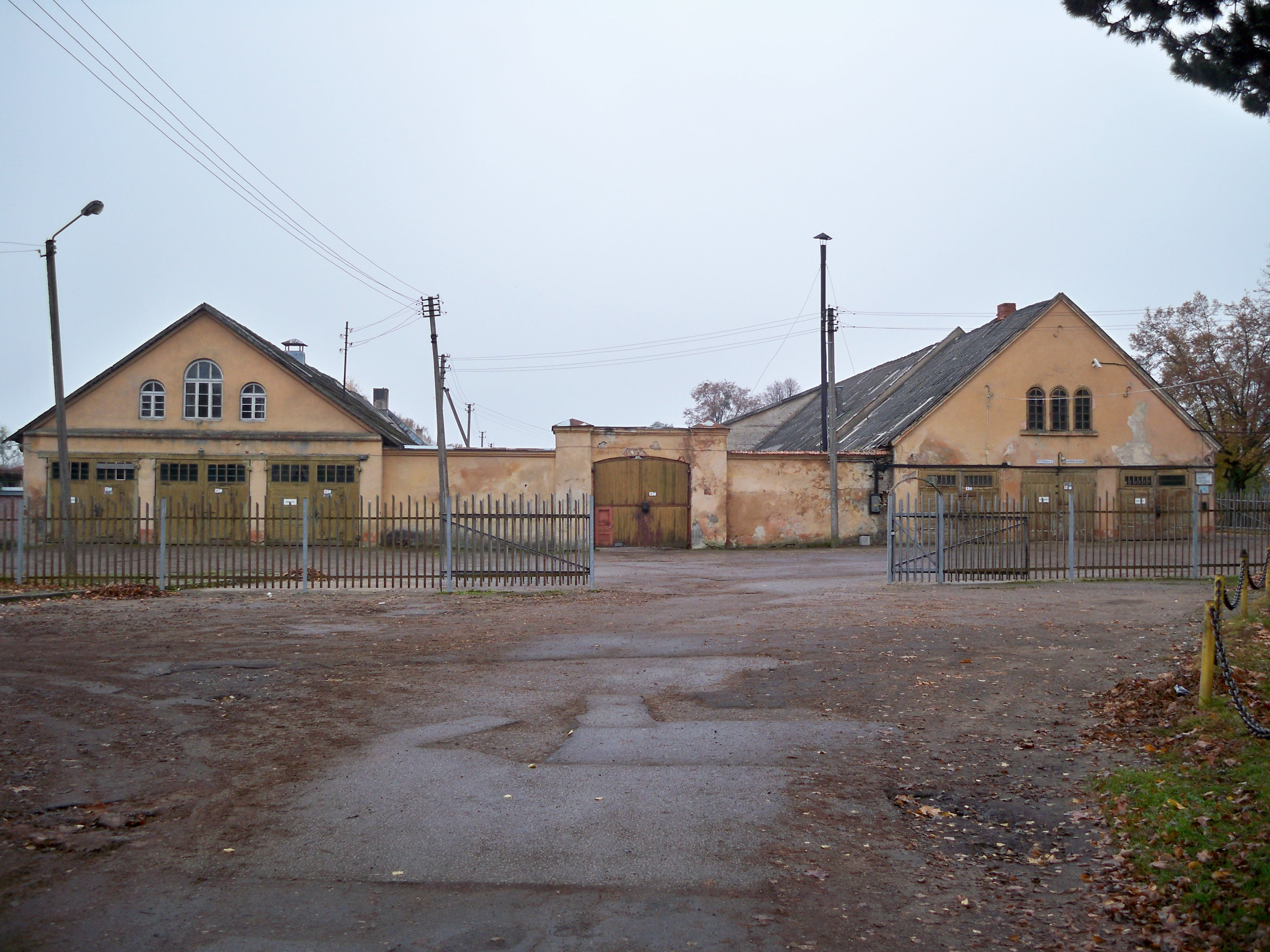
Stables

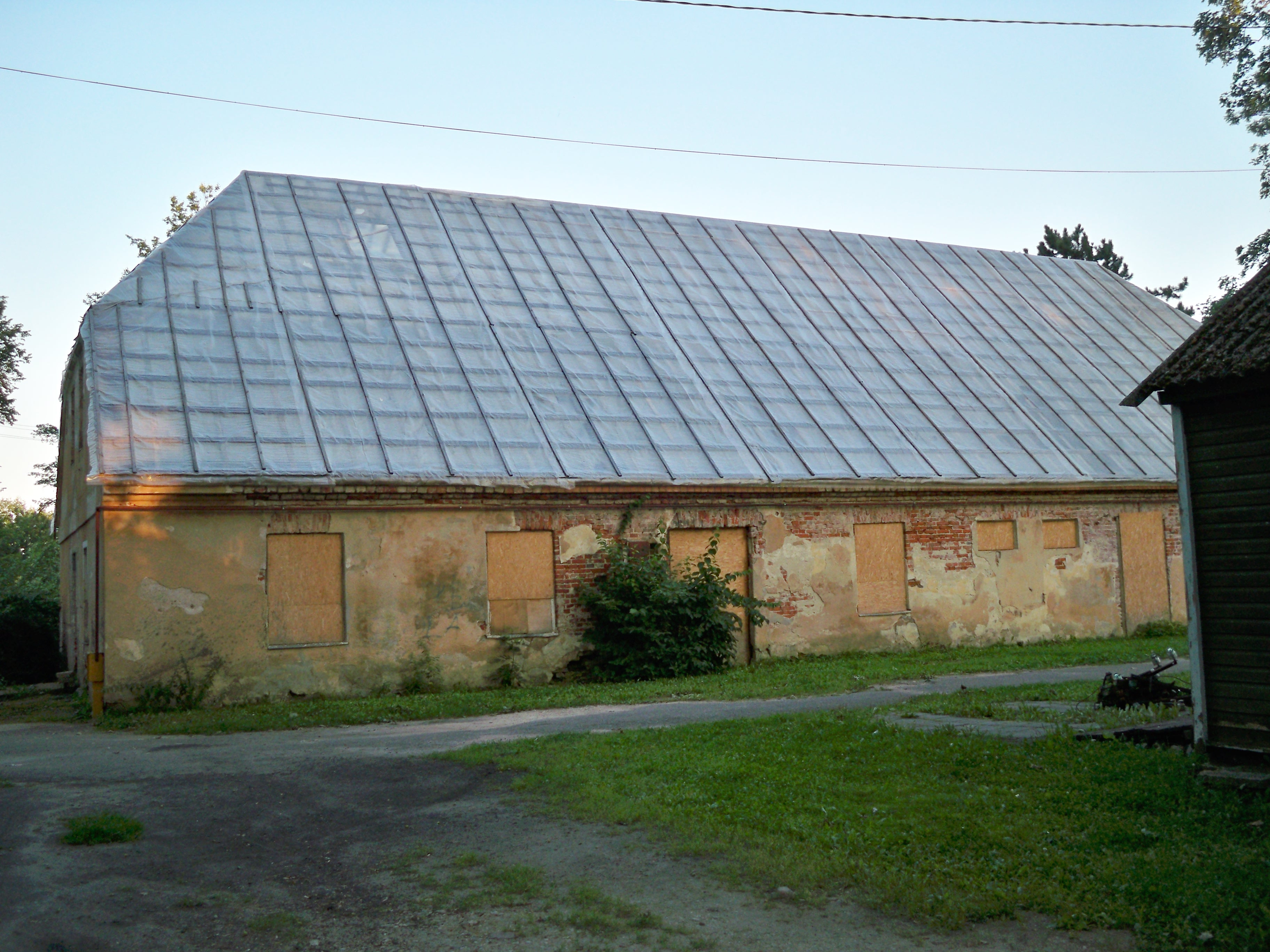
Barn
