= Vincentas Jakševičius =

Lithuanian sculptor

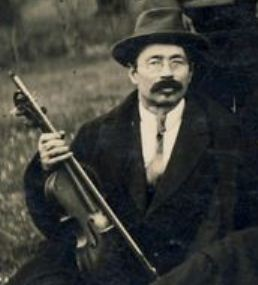
- Vincentas Jakševičius around 1928
- Born: Vincentas Jakševičius c. 1873; Naujamiestis district, Russian Empire
- Died: July 19, 1936 (aged 62–63); Kaišiadorys, Lithuania
- Resting place: Kaišiadorys Cemetery
- Occupation: Sculptor
- Notable work: Kaišiadorys Cathedral (interior), Švėkšna Manor Park
- Relatives: Brother Benjaminas Jakševičius

Vincentas Jakševičius (c. 1873 in Naujamiestis district, Russian Empire – July 19, 1936 in Kaišiadorys, Lithuania) was a Lithuanian sculptor specializing in church interiors. His works, occasionally accompanied by either his sons or his brother, include various pieces of religious art, mainly statues of the saints and altars, in Kaišiadorys, Švėkšna and various other parts of Lithuania.

== Biography ==
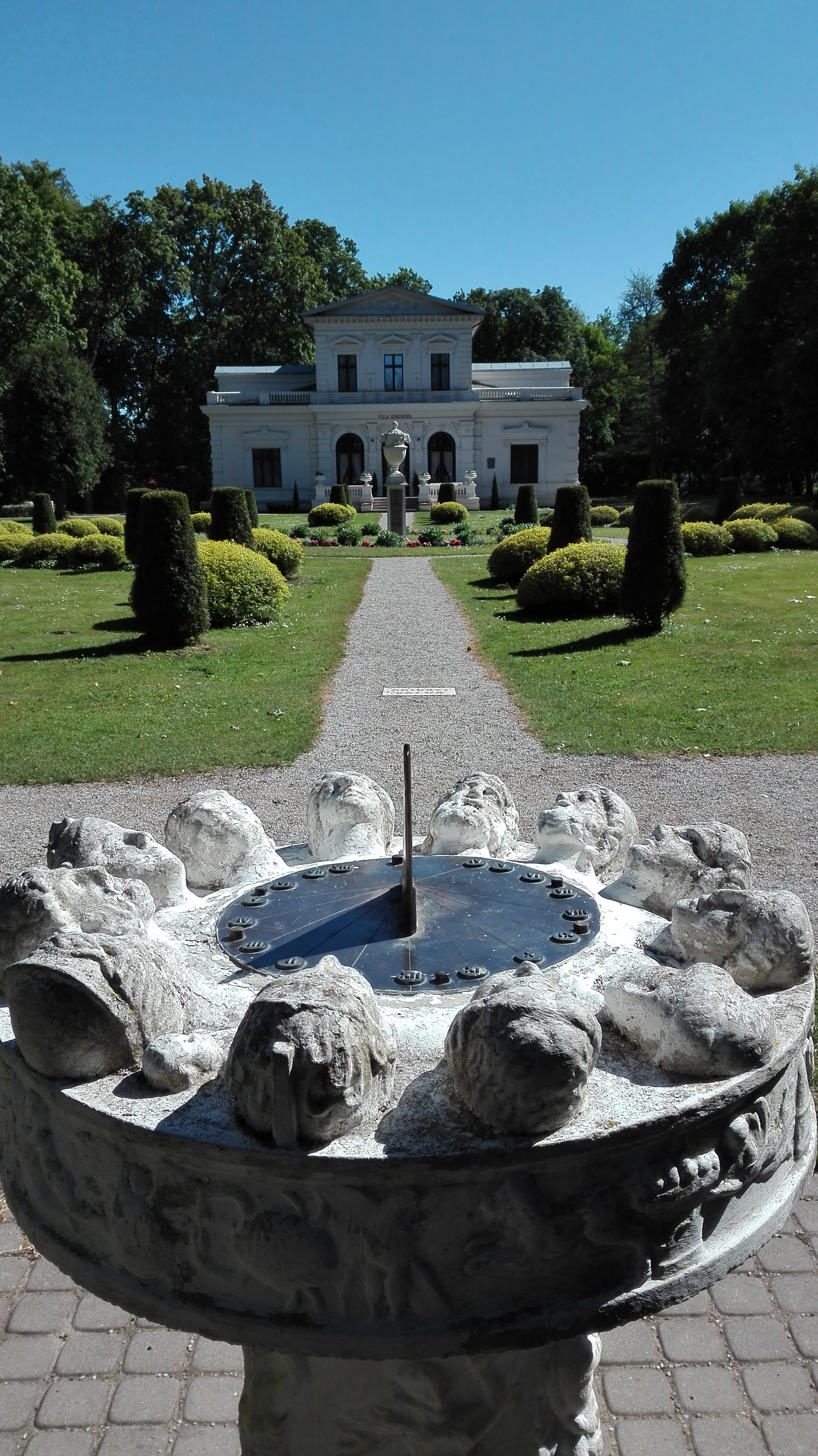
Sundial created by Jakševičius in front of the Švėkšna Manor

Vincentas was presumably the eldest among his siblings, born to a family of Aleksandras Jakševičius and Marija Guzėnaitė-Jakševičienė. His father was a carpenter and sculptor, progenitor of three generations of artists. Jakševičius' family moved to Panevėžys in ca 1887 where three youngest Vincentas' siblings were born. Jakševičius married a noble woman in 1897 and had a large family. However, out of seven of his children, three died in infancy or early childhood.

Jakševičius' talent for art was recognized at early age. According to family history, as a teenager, he carved a portrait of Tsar Alexander III of Russia which earned him free education in Vilnius and Saint Petersburg. Jakševičius moved around frequently, but settled in Švėkšna where he built a family house around 1920 on land gifted to him by the Plater family, owners of Švėkšna Manor.

Jakševičius worked with his family members, first with his father, then younger brother Benjaminas, and later with sons Silvanas (1900–1933) and Adomas (1908–1967). Working as a team, they were able to undertake larger and more complex projects. Jakševičius was a versatile artists as he could design and implement (sculpt, paint, carve) various projects. He is mostly known for his work in decorating churches: pulpits, altars, furniture (benches, ceremonial seats), sculptures, paintings, wall decor, various decorative elements, etc. He also built grottos of Our Lady of Lourdes (in Veiviržėnai, Ablinga, Gardamas, Dembava, Inkakliai) as well as grave monuments. Their major project was the interior decor of Kaišiadorys Cathedral. Jakševičius suffered a heart attack while working in Gegužinė Church on July 19, 1936. He was buried in Kaišiadorys Cemetery.

A symbolic bench to commemorate Vincentas Jakševičius' legacy in Švėkšna was unveiled in 2014. There were also exhibitions organised in Panevėžys and Šilutė to commemorate the legacy of Jakševičius' family.

== Selected works ==
- Nine exterior sculptures for Joniškis Church (1899–1901)
- Interior of Švėkšna Church (finished 1905)
- Main altar in Dembava Church (c. 1907)
- Sculptures in Švėkšna Manor Park (1912–1914)
- Church gate in Naujamiestis (1917)
- Three altars in Alanta Church (1928–1931)
- Altars, sculptures and other religious art in Kaišiadorys Cathedral (1929–1932)
- The main altar in Gegužinė Church (1935–1936)
