= Švėkšna Manor =

Coordinates: 55°30′51″N 21°37′08″E

'Villa Genowefa' at Švėkšna Manor
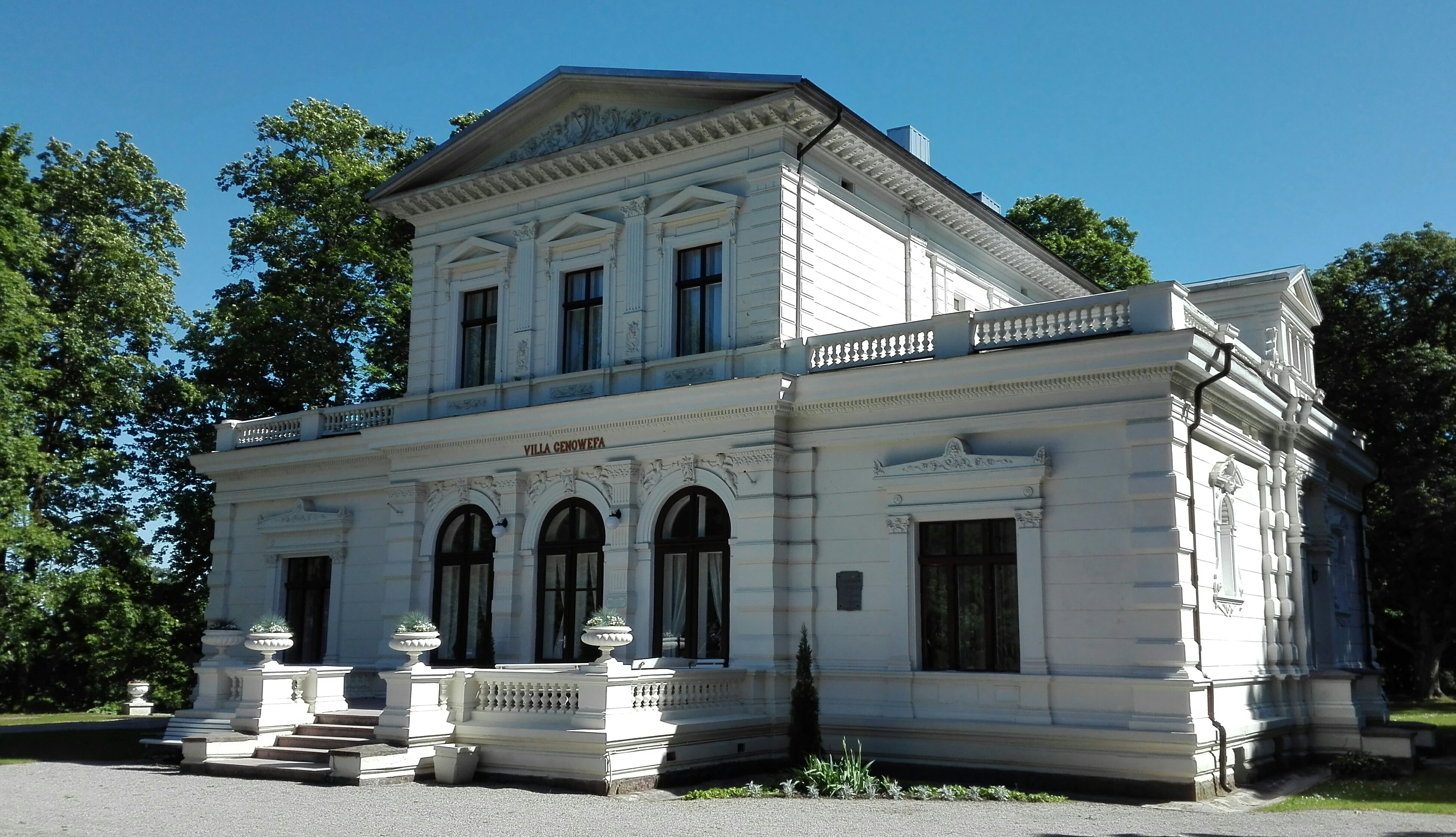
- Interactive map of the 'Villa Genowefa' at Švėkšna Manor area

General information
- Location: Parko st. 4, Švėkšna, Lithuania., Švėkšna, Lithuania
- Construction started: 1880

Švėkšna Manor is a former residential manor in Švėkšna, Šilutė district. It was last occupied by Countess Felicija Laimė Broël-Plater.

== History ==
=== The Kęsgaila family ===
Švėkšna Estate was first recorded in the 15th century. At that time, it belonged to Elder of Samogitia and Castellan of Vilnius Mykolas Kęsgaila (c. 1380 – c. 1452). Mykolas established the Kęsgaila family in Samogitia, where their power rivalled that of the Grand Duke of Lithuania. The area of Švėkšna Estate was huge, bordering on Gardamas, Rietavas, Pajūralis and the Duchy of Prussia.

The Kęsgaila family owned Švėkšna until 1569, when a Kęsgaila daughter married Jonas Zaviša. Ownership of Švėkšna then passed into the Zaviša family who owned it until 1624.

=== 1624–1766 ===
Between 1624 and 1644 Švėkšna was owned by Pajūris district overseer Hieronim Kryszpin-Kirszenstejn. Hieronim set up the first Samogitian factory here, in the form of workshops for the manufacture of glass and paper (the latter was used for Samogitian court documents).

Švėkšna changed hands frequently over the next 100 years: between 1644 and 1694 it was owned by Denhofs; 1694–1721 by Grotesai; and 1721–1766 by the Ogiński family. Over the period, the estate had begun to fall into disrepair.

=== The Broël-Plater Family ===
In 1766, the Broël-Plater family bought the estate from the Ogiński family. The first family member to rule Švėkšna was Livonian Count Wilhelm Jan Broël-Plater (1715–1769).

==== Jerzy Broël-Plater (c. 1760 – 1825) ====
Švėkšna was inherited from Wilhelm by his son, Count Jerzy Broël-Plater (c. 1760 – 1825).

Jerzy divided the estate in 1820 between his four sons:

- Švėkšna went to amateur archeologist Stefan Broël-Plater (1799 – c. 1825);
- Franciszek Broël-Plater (1798–1867) received Vilkėnas Manor;
- Jerzy Broël-Plater (1810–1836) received Gedminaičiai Manor (which no longer survives);
- Kazimierz Broël-Plater (1807–1872) received Stemplės Manor.

==== Stefan Broël-Plater (1799 – c. 1825) ====
After studying law in Vilnius, Stefan Broël-Plater traveled to Europe and the Middle East, visiting Greece, Turkey, Palestine and Egypt. He returned with souvenirs and art works. Among them could be the seven Egyptian statues his son Count Adam Broël-Plater (1836–1909) found in barrows in 1852.

When Stefan returned to Lithuania, he built a school at his own expense in Kretinga, and maintained a student dormitory in Vilnius. He was a judge of the boundary court and President of the Chamber of the Civil Court.

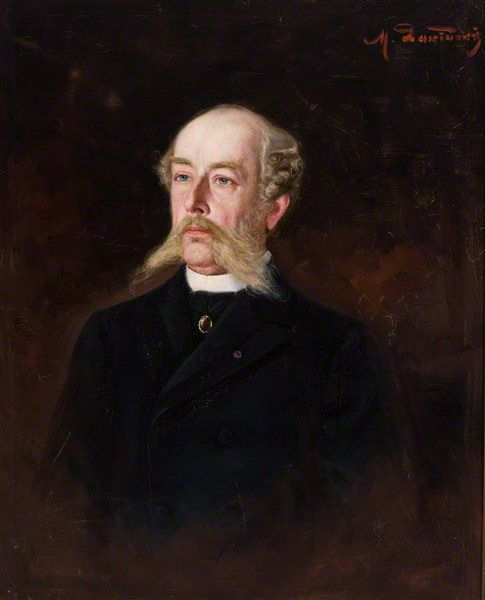
Adam Broël-Plater

When Stefan died, Švėkšna went to his son, Adam Broël-Plater. At that time, the manor house was a single-story wooden structure which lasted until 1952, when it was demolished.

==== Adam Broël-Plater (1836–1909) ====
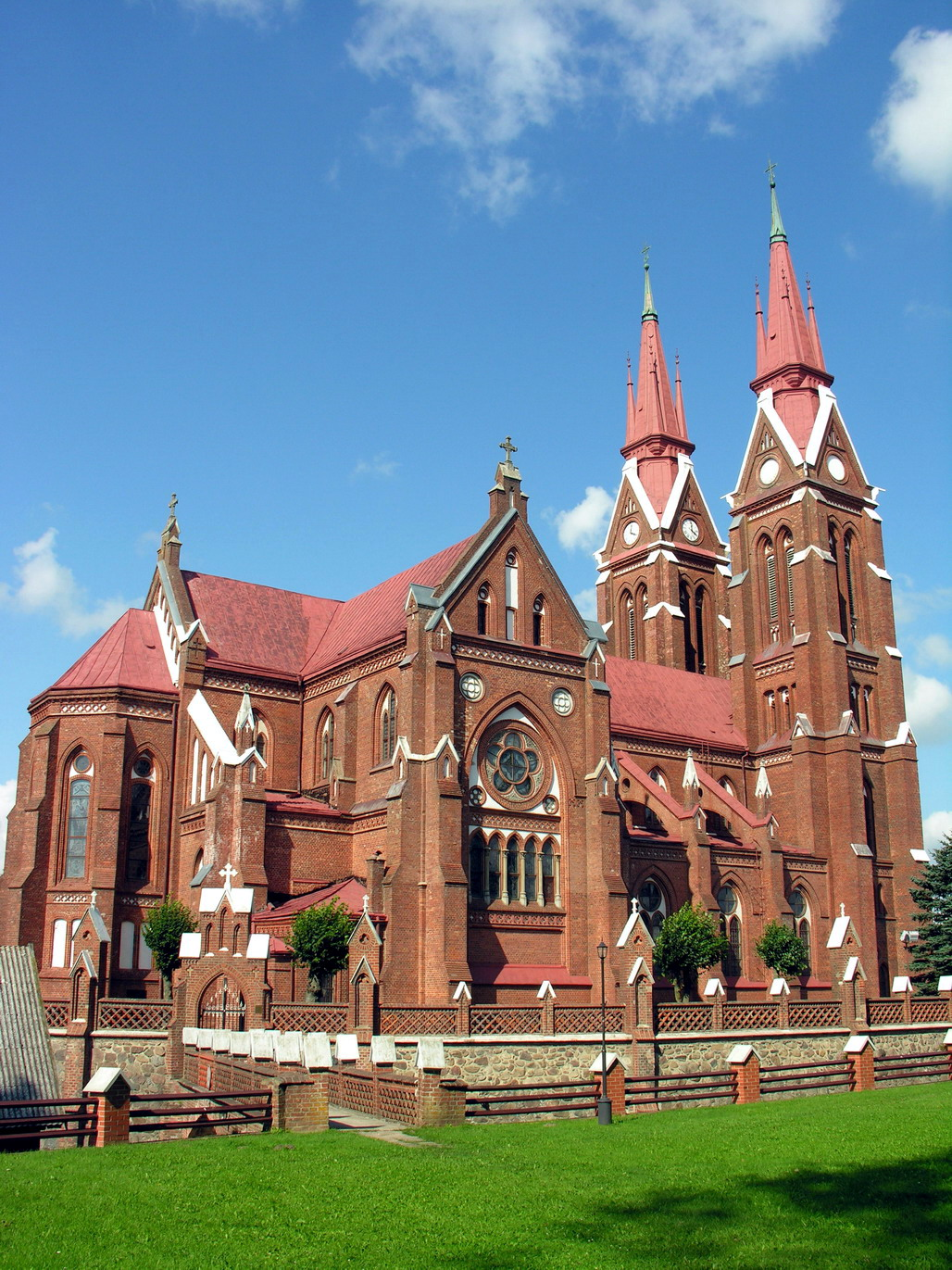
Church of St. James the Apostle in Švėkšna

Significant changes happened to the estate between the end of the 19th to the beginning of the 20th centuries. A residential zone was built on the hill overlooking the Šalna and Švėkšnalė rivers, and an agricultural and service zone was built in the Šalna River valley and along its left bank. Ponds, a mill, and a park with sculptures, steps, and foot-bridges were built. A wide avenue connected the mansion and the Church of St. James the Apostle. Adam Broël-Plater donated 50,000 rubles for the construction of the church and provided all necessary bricks and tiles that were manufactured at the estate.

Count Adam Alfred Broël-Plater inherited his father's interest in archaeology, but Adam's focus lay closer to home. He explored various places in Lithuania, including the Kernavė mounds. He became a member of Vilnius Archaeological Commission and a member of the Russian Archaeological Society of St. Petersburg.

Later in life, Adam occupied a high position in the Tsar's Palace in St. Petersburg and hosted high-ranking guests at the estate. The guests visited in order to hunt, a hobby shared by all the Švėkšna landlords. For such a purpose, a fenced-off area, covering 70 hectares, enclosed moose, roe deer and pheasants. New buildings were needed for the reception of the high-ranking guests.

In 1880, Count Adam Alfred Broël-Plater built a graceful, small Empire-style palace next to the old Švėkšna Manor house, and named it after his wife - Genowefa (b. 1852) - 'Villa Genowefa'. The building was also used for family celebrations and receptions.

==== Jerzy Floryan Broël-Plater (1875–1943) ====
After Adam died in 1909, the estate was managed by his wife, Genowefa. She was a rare guest at Švėkšna, however, preferring life in Paris.

Between 1912 and 1940 Adam and Genowefa's son, Count Jerzy Floryan Plater (1875–1943), managed the estate. In 1812, Jerzy married his second cousin, Janina Plater (1890–1940), who would inherit Vilkėnas Manor when her father died in 1922.

In 1913, Janina and Jerzy had a son, named after his grandfather, Aleksander Adam Plater (1913–1997).

===== World War I =====
When World War I began, Jerzy Plater was mobilized and appointed as Chief of Staff of the Pskov Reserve Brigade, and later as Assistant to the Chief of the Cavalry, in Luga, Russia. During the war, German Baron Weitenhorst lived in both Švėkšna and Vilkėnas. The Germans damaged the buildings at Švėkšna and destroyed the famous Manor zoo.

===== The Interwar Period =====
In 1918, during the era of Lithuanian Independence, Jerzy returned from Russia to Švėkšna and lived there until the beginning of Sovietization. He built the St. Florian and Diane sculptures, and solar clock.

In 1922, Jerzy's wife Janina inherited Vilkėnas Manor when her father died, thus reuniting the two estates.

Jerzy donated part of Švėkšna park to the gymnasium and supported it after 1925. He also participated in the life of the town. In 1935, after the death of his mother Genowefa, Jerzy inherited works of art that had been brought to her apartment in Paris, which were then transferred to Švėkšna.

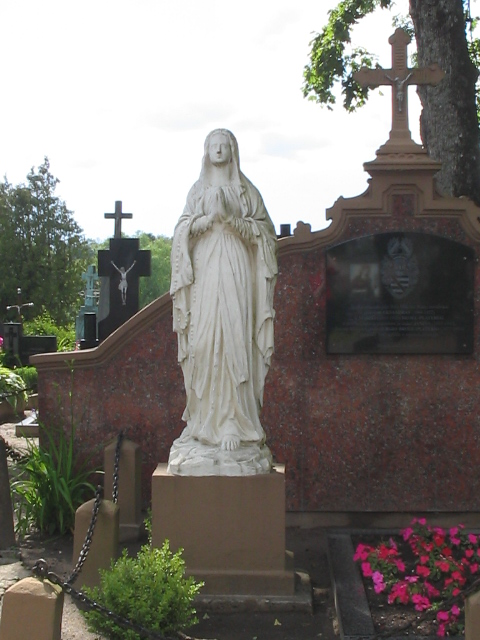
Janina Broël-Plater's grave

===== World War II =====
In 1940, the Soviets nationalized the estate and Jerzy was expelled from the manor.

The Bolsheviks burned all of the Švėkšna Manor archives and library books and destroyed many valuable works of art. Only a small number of items and pictures were taken to the Telšiai Museum, where they have been preserved until now. Jerzy Plater was deported to Siberia where he died, buried in an unknown grave.

Janina Plater lived in the mill and later in a house near the cemetery. In 1940, she fell ill and, after being taken to Kaunas Hospital, soon died. Her body was taken to the Švėkšna cemetery chapel and quietly buried in front of the family tomb. A statue of the Virgin Mary is erected on her grave. There is no inscription.

Jerzy and Janina's son Aleksander Adam Plater (1913–1997) inherited Švėkšna.

==== Aleksander Broël-Plater (1913–1997) ====
During the German occupation, Aleksander returned to the estates, and lived in Švėkšna Manor, while Vilkėnas was left to the Germans.

Aleksander married Felicja Laime Veresilka (1921–2015) in 1943. Between 1941 and 1944, Aleksander lived in Švėkšna, and taught geography, biology and public science at Švėkšna Gymnasium. In 1944 he left for Germany, where in 1945–1947 he taught at Bad Worishofen Displaced Persons' Camp School, organized the camp's Lithuanian committee and was its chairman.

He then went to the US in 1949, where he lived for the remainder of his life.

===== The Soviet Period =====
After World War II, 'Villa Genowefa' was equipped with a cinema, but the other unattended buildings were left to deteriorate.

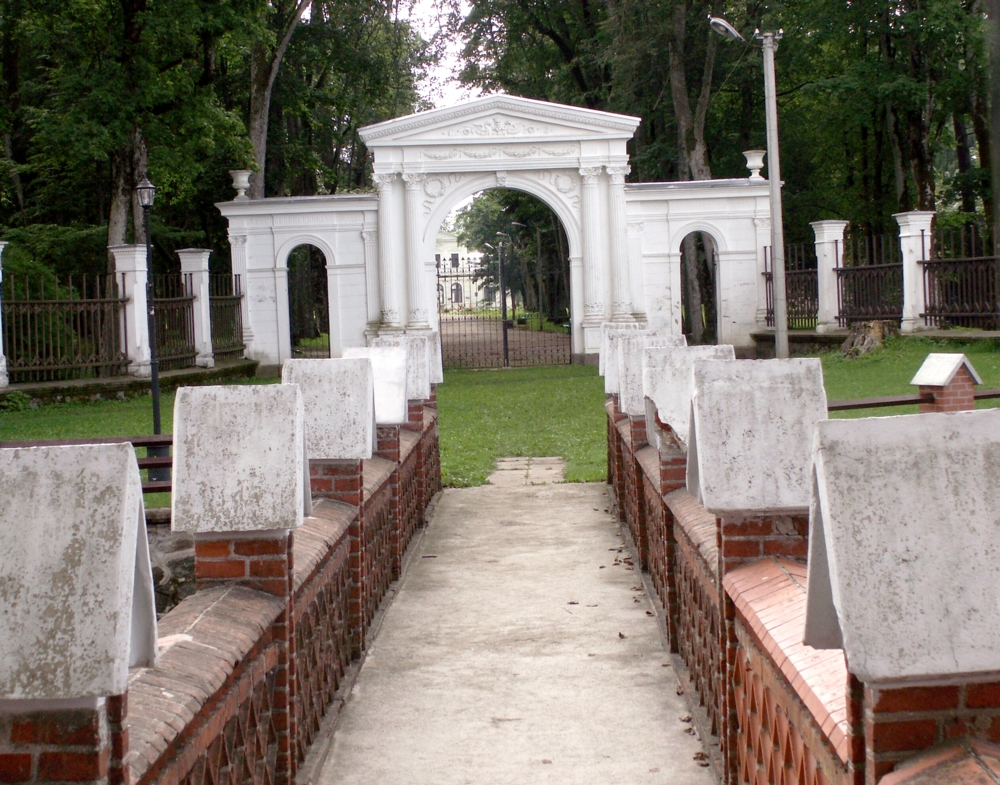
Bridge, leading to St. Jacob church.

A Soviet soldier was buried in front of the villa in the parterre and a monument was erected. The old wooden manor house was demolished c. 1952. Though only the foundations are left of Švėkšna Manor, 'Villa Genowefa' still stands.

After Lithuania regained independence, the remains of the soldier was redeemed at Švėkšna Cemetery.

==== Felicija Laimė Plater ====
In 2001, both Švėkšna and Vilkėnas Estates were returned to the Plater family: to Countess Felicija Laimė Plater, wife of Aleksander Plater (1913–1997). She repaired 'Villa Genowefa', renewed the flower beds, restored some park architecture and the stylish park gates and established a museum.

On 28 October 2015 Countess Felicija Plater died in Washington, DC. Her remains were to be brought to Lithuania and placed alongside her husband, who was buried 17 years previously, in the crypt of the Šventoji Catholic Church.
