= Vilkėnas Manor =

Coordinates: 55.4972°N 21.6343°E

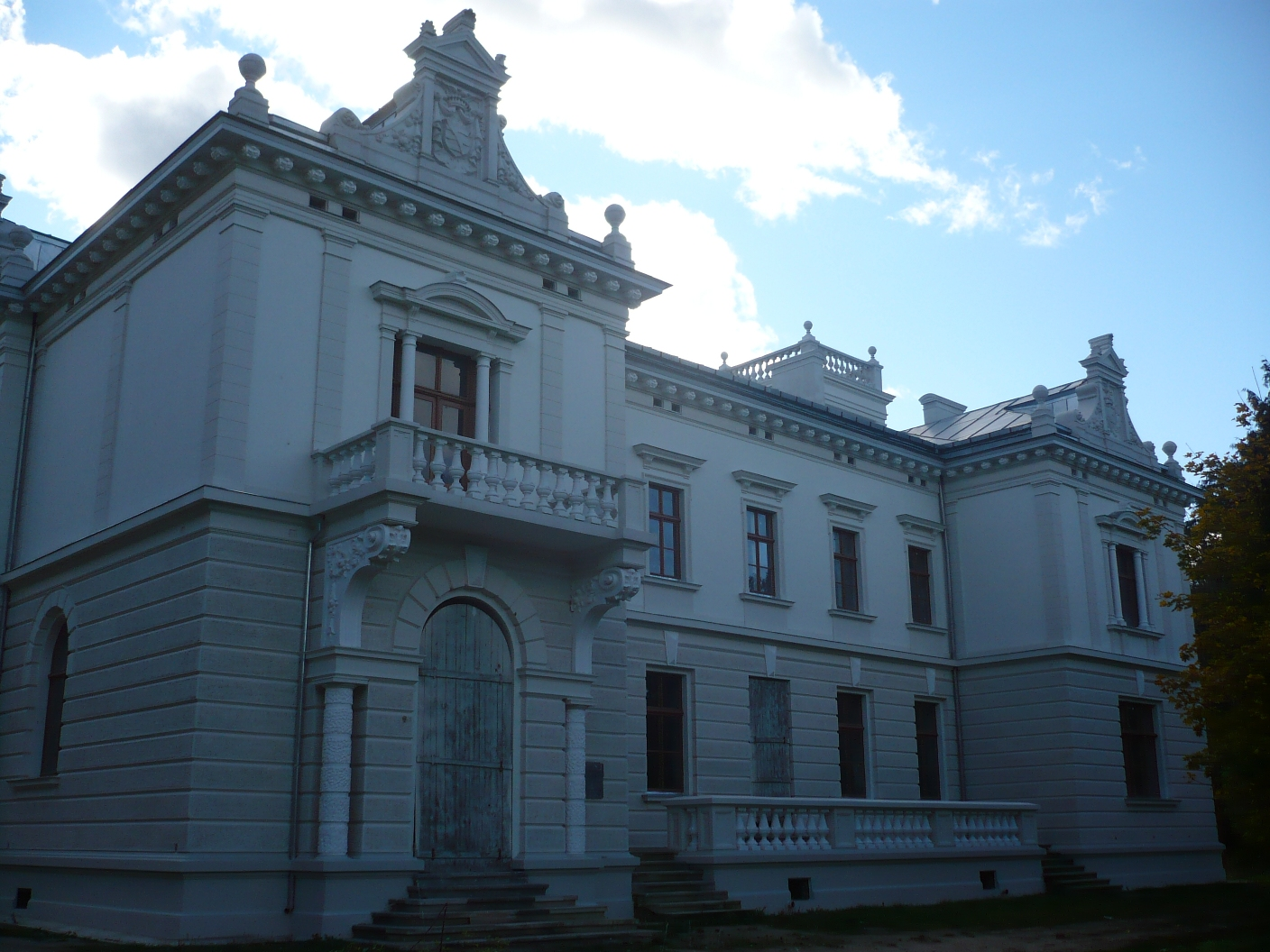
- Interactive map of the Vilkėnas Manor area

General information
- Location: Vilkėnas Village, Švėkšna 99388
- Construction started: 1880
- Completed: 1897

Vilkėnas Manor is a former residential manor in Vilkėnas Village, Švėkšna, Lithuania.

== History ==
=== Jerzy Broël-Plater (c1760-1825) ===
Vilkėnas Estate was initially part of Švėkšna Estate, mentioned since 1695. It was owned by Jerzy Broël-Plater (c1760-1825).

The Broël-Platers were a family of well-known and influential Polish counts. Their earliest known origin are in Westphalia, Germany. In the 14th and 15th centuries, members of the family were Livonian Knights. They came to the Baltic area and settled in present-day Estonia, Latvia and Lithuania.

=== Franciszek Broël-Plater (1798-1867) ===
Vilkėnas Estate became independent when in 1820, Count Jerzy Broël-Plater divided the large Švėkšna Estate between his four sons:

- Švėkšna went to Stefan Broël-Plater (1799-1864);
- Jerzy Broël-Plater(1810-1836) received Gedminaičiai Manor (which no longer survives);
- Kazimierz Broël-Plater (1807-1872) received Stemplių Manor;
- Franciszek Broël-Plater (1798-1867) received Vilkėnas.

=== Aleksander Broël-Plater (1845-1922) ===
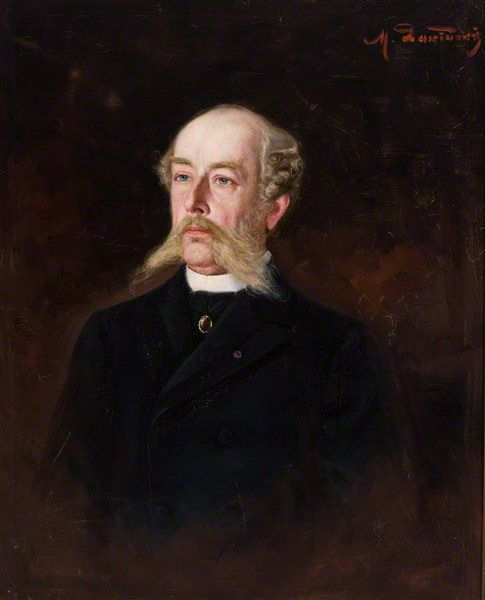
Adam Broël-Plater (1836-1909)

When Franciszek Broël-Plater died in 1867, his son, Aleksander Broël-Plater (1845-1922) inherited Vilkėnas.

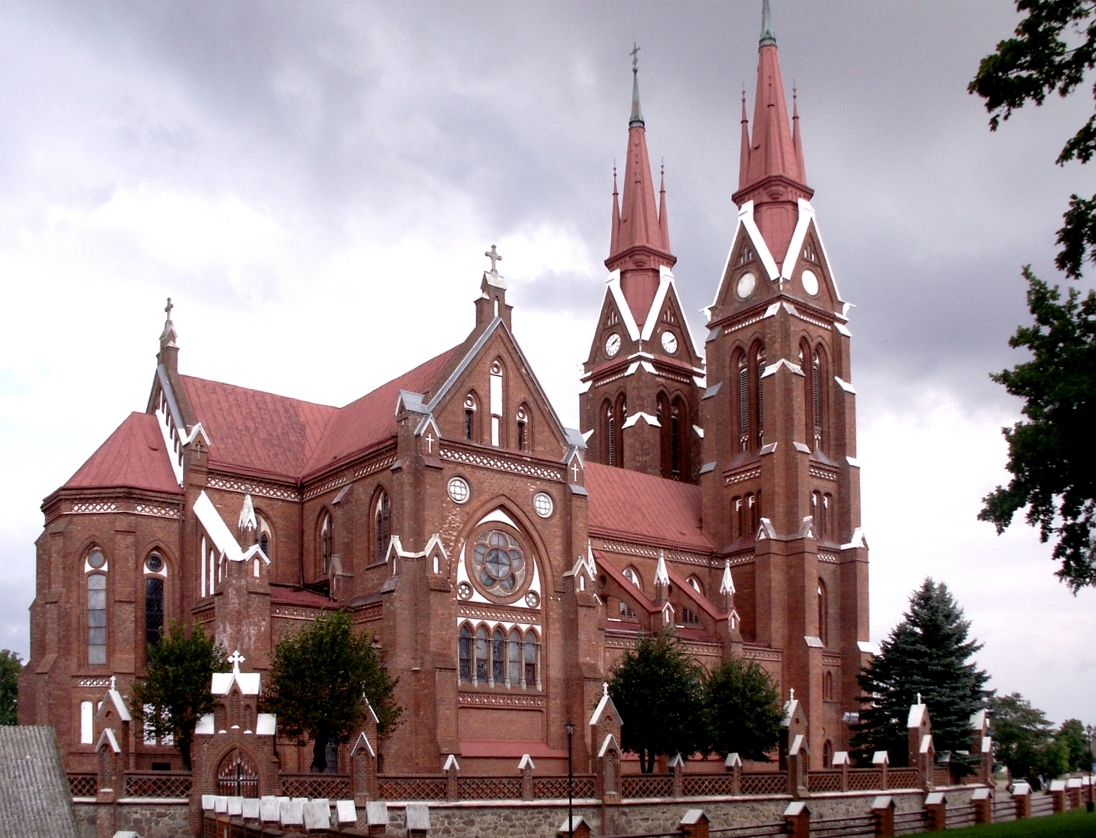
St. James the Apostle Church in Švėkšna

Between 1880-1897, Aleksander built the two-storey Neo-Renaissance manor house with a tower on a high terrace. It was the most impressive of all the former Broël-Plater estates in Švėkšna district. In 1880, at the initiative of Aleksander's wife, planting in the park also started.

Along with his cousin, Adam Broël-Plater (1836-1909) (Grand Marshal of the Tsar's Palace, later the Marshal of the Nobility of Vilnius Province and the Chairman of the Vilnius Land Bank), Aleksander Broël-Plater donated 50,000 rubles for the construction of the church of St. James the Apostle in Švėkšna, providing all the necessary bricks and tiles which were manufactured on their estates. The main altar was made in Tirol, Austria, and donated by Alexander.

Aleksander Broël-Plater and his wife Maria had two daughters, Olga Broël-Plater (1889-1952) and Janina Broël-Plater (1890-1940). In 1912, Janina married her second cousin, Count Jerzy Broël-Plater (1875-1943), owner of Švėkšna. In 1913, Janina and Jerzy had a son, named after his grandfather, Aleksander Broël-Plater (1913-1997).

==== World War I ====
When World War I began, Jerzy was mobilized and appointed as Chief of Staff of the Pskov Reserve Brigade, and later as Assistant to the Chief of the Cavalry, in Luga, Russia.

During the war, German Baron Weitenhorst lived in both Švėkšna and Vilkėnas. In the summer of 1918, Jerzy returned to Švėkšna.

=== Janice Broël-Plater (1890-1940) ===
When Alexander Broël-Plater died in 1922, Vilkėnas was inherited by his daughter, Janice Broël-Plater (1890-1940). As Janice was married to her second cousin Jerzy Broël-Plater, owner of Švėkšna, Švėkšna and Vilkėnas manors were reunited into one estate again. With the land reforms of 1923, however, the family lost much of their land. After 1925, Jerzy gave part of Švėkšna park to build a gymnasium building.

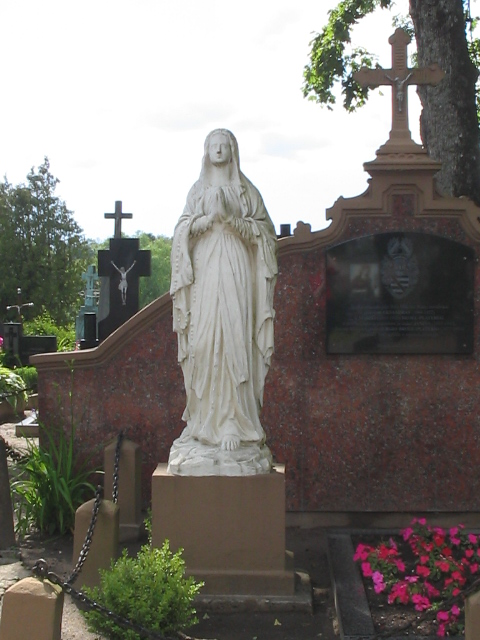
Janice Broël-Plater's grave

==== World War II ====
In 1940, Vilkėnas was nationalized, and units of the Russian Army settled there. The Broël-Platers were expelled from the manor houses.

Janice Broël-Plater lived in the mill and later in a house near the cemetery. In 1940, she fell ill and, after being taken to Kaunas Hospital, soon died. Her body was taken to the Švėkšna cemetery chapel and quietly buried in front of the family tomb. A statue of the Virgin Mary is erected on her grave. There is no inscription. Jerzy Broël-Plater was deported to Siberia where he died in 1943, buried in an unknown grave. During the German occupation, Jerzy’s son Alexander Broël-Plater (1913-1997) returned to the estates, but lived in Švėkšna Manor, while Vilkėnas Manor was left to the Germans.

Alexander married Countess Felicija Laimė Broël-Plater (1921-2015) in 1943. Between 1941-1944, Alexander lived in Švėkšna, and taught geography, biology and public science at Švėkšna Gymnasium. In 1944 he retired to Germany, where in 1945-1947 he taught at Bad Worishofen Displaced Persons’ Camp School, organized the camp's Lithuanian committee and was its chairman. He then went to the US in 1949, where he lived for the remainder of his life. He died in Washington, DC in 1997.

=== The Soviet Era ===
Several years after Alexander left, a children's home was set up in Vilkėnas Manor. New buildings erected during the Soviet period destroyed the estate’s authentic design. It housed a sanatorium school until 1979. Later the mansion was later handed over to the Šilutė hydraulic transmission factory. It was then abandoned.

=== Independent Lithuania ===
In 1993 Vilkėnas Manor, the park and several other buildings, were returned to the legitimate heir, Alexander’s widow, Countess Felicija Laimė Broël-Plater (1921-2015), who at her own expense repaired parts of Švėkšna and Vilkėnas Estates. On October 28, 2015 Countess Felicija Broël-Plater died in Washington, DC, USA. Her remains were to be brought to Lithuania and placed alongside her husband, who was buried 17 years previously, in the crypt of the Šventoji Catholic Church.

The building is registered as Unique object code 1016 in Lithuania's Registry of Heritage Buildings.

== The Park ==
The park covers an area of 13 hectares with about 70 species of trees and shrubs including some rare trees
