= Benjaminas Jakševičius =

Lithuanian sculptor and partisan

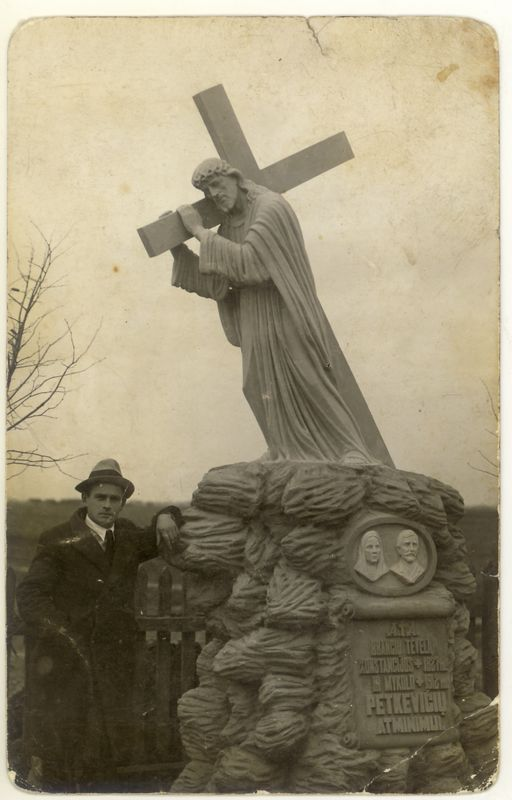
- Jakševičius next to one of his works in 1930s
- Born: Benjaminas Jakševičius; March 31, 1895; Panevėžys, Russian Empire
- Died: August 13, 1979 (aged 84); Kaunas, Lithuanian SSR, Soviet Union
- Resting place: Kavarskas Cemetery
- Occupation: Sculptor
- Notable work: Panevėžys Cathedral (1929–1930, interior), sculptures in Troškūnai
- Spouse: Elžbieta Jakševičienė (1925–1932)
- Children: 4 (Irena, Birutė, Vytautas and Algimantas)
- Relatives: Father Aleksandras Jakševičius, Brother Vincentas Jakševičius

Benjaminas Jakševičius (March 31, 1895 – August 13, 1979) was a Lithuanian sculptor and partisan. Together with his brother Vincentas and nephews Silvanas and Adomas, he contributed to religious art by building sacred statues and altars, mainly in Panevėžys, Švėkšna and various other parts of Lithuania. He also built several sculptures, predominantly religious ones, in Troškūnai, Kavarskas, Burbiškis, Upytė, Raguva and Pasvalys.

== Biography ==
Jakševičius was the youngest among his brothers, born to a peasant family. His father Aleksandras was a carpenter and sculptor.

In 1915 he worked for his oldest brother, Vincentas. At the same year he was summoned to the civil service in the Tsarist army. He was released from the service later due to his illness and lived in Yekaterinburg Governorate for a while. In 1918 he came back to Lithuania, where he lived mostly in Švėkšna and Panevėžys from 1922 to 1925 while engaging in creating religious art. Later he moved to Kavarskas and married Elžbieta Striogaitė on November 28, 1925, with whom he had four children. However, he was soon left a widower, as his wife died in 1932, leaving four small children. Benjaminas Jakševičius lived in Kavarskas until 1945, at the same time traveling to other places where he worked as a sculptor and church decorator.

In July 1945, he joined anti-Soviet resistance movement and was a member of "Liūtas" and "Žaibas" squads (parts of Vytis district, codename Dzedunia and Šaltekšnis. He was caught in 1948 in Miknevičius' forest, not far away from Raguva and sentenced to 25 years of imprisonment in GULAG. He spent most of his prison term as a deportee in the Mordovian ASSR. In 1960s he was allowed to move to any Soviet republic, except Lithuanian SSR, but he came back to Lithuania nevertheless and was under surveillance by KGB until his death.

Jakševičius died on August 13, 1979, in Kaunas and was buried in Kavarskas Cemetery in the family grave with the white concrete sculpture of St. Mary created by him.

Two of his sons, Vytautas and Algimantas, were folk artists. His oldest daughter Irena Jakševičiūtė-Sabūnienė, a former active helper of Lithuanian partisans during the postwar years, was posthumously recognized as a Lithuanian freedom fighter (laisvės kovų dalyvis).

== Legacy ==
The wooden chess carved by Jakševičius and some of his photos are on exhibition in the Ninth Fort, as well as one family photo in Antanas Baranauskas and Antanas Vienuolis-Žukauskas memorial museum.

Many sculptures and gravestones made by Jakševičius are a part of Lithuanian National heritage.
