= Burbiškis Manor =

Burbiškis Manor may refer to:

- Burbiškis Manor (Anykščiai)
- Burbiškis Manor (Radviliškis)
