= Vilnius Land Bank =

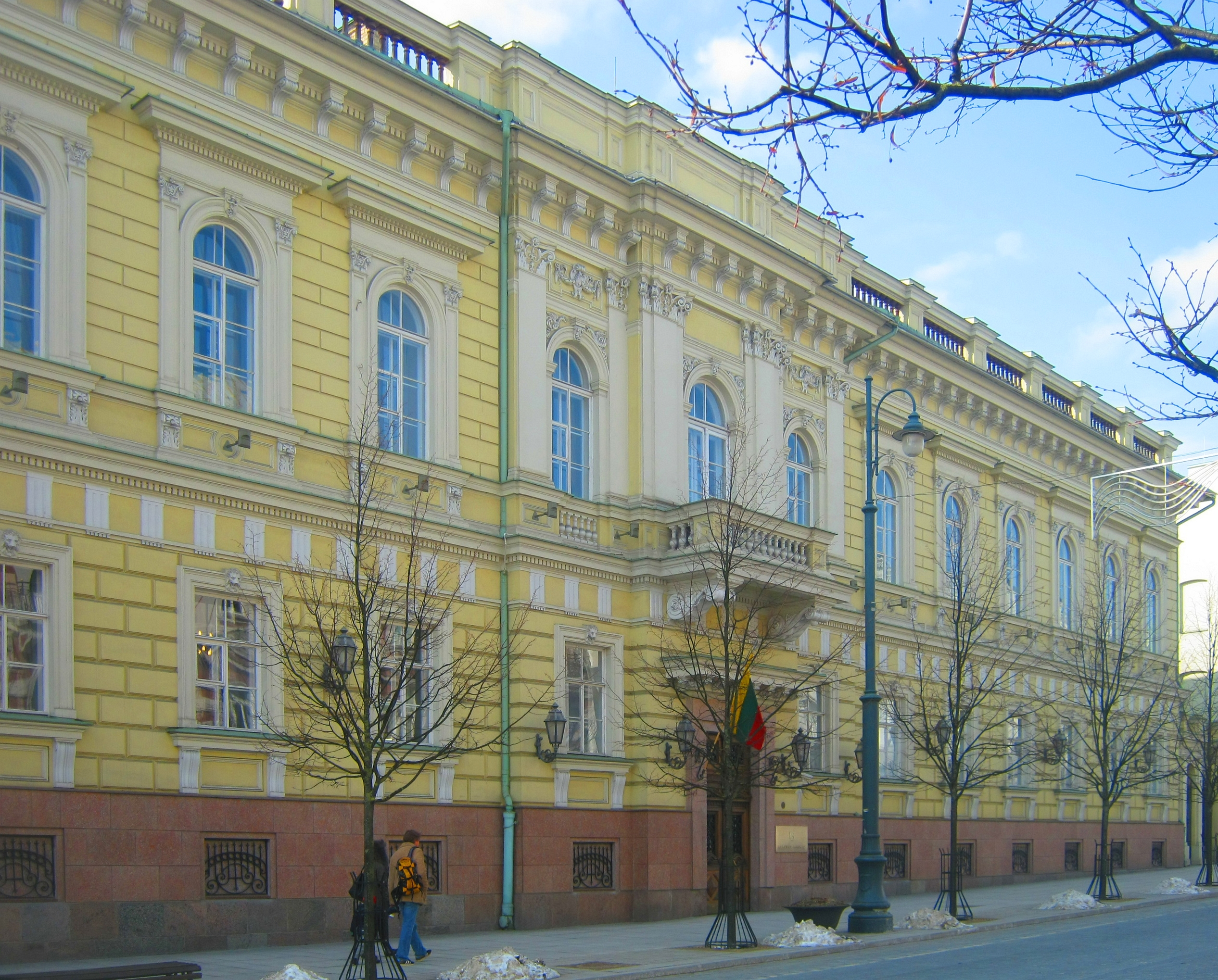
- Former headquarters of Vilnius Land Bank (present-day headquarters of Bank of Lithuania on the Gediminas Avenue)
- Native name: Виленский земельный банк Wileński Bank Ziemski
- Company type: Joint-stock company
- Industry: Banking
- Genre: Mortgage bank
- Founded: 9 August 1872
- Defunct: 1939
- Fate: Dissolved
- Headquarters: Vilnius (Vilna, Wilno), Russian Empire (later Second Polish Republic)
- Area served: Northwestern Krai; Vilnius Region
- Key people: Adam Alfred Plater (Chairman in 1900–1908); Józef Montwiłł; Nikolay Zubov (Chairman in 1872–98); Paweł Piotr Kończa (Chairman in 1909/1910–15); Aleksander Meysztowicz (Chairman in 1918–26, 1932–39)
- Products: Long-term mortgages
- Total assets: 114 million złoty (1936)
- Total equity: 6.3 million złoty (1936)
- Number of employees: 131 (1915)

Vilnius Land Bank (Lithuanian: Vilniaus žemės bankas, Polish: Wileński Bank Ziemski, Russian: Виленский земельный банк) was the first bank established in Vilnius, present-day Lithuania. It was a private joint-stock mortgage bank serving the Northwestern Krai of the Russian Empire. Its mission was to provide loans collateralized by real estate to manor owners (agriculture) and city residents (industry). As it could not accept deposits, the bank issued mortgage bonds to raise funds for the loans. The bank was established in 1872 after a banking reform. It was one of eleven land banks operating in the Empire, and grew to be one of the largest. Despite several economic crises, particularly the one caused by the Russian Revolution of 1905, the outstanding loans grew from 5 million rubles in 1874 to 148.8 million in 1912. Both Lithuanians and Russians complained that the bank was controlled by and served the Polish interests. During World War I, the bank was evacuated to Petrograd (Saint Petersburg). After the war, in 1920, it returned to Vilnius, which became part of the Second Polish Republic. It continued to operate at diminished volumes until the Soviet invasion of Poland in 1939.

== Historical background ==
At the time of the Emancipation reform of 1861, there were no credit facilities available to landowners. The State Bank of the Russian Empire (predecessor of the Central Bank of Russia) was founded in 1862 but did not deal in mortgages. A new law was passed in May 1872 which allowed the Ministry of Finance of the Russian Empire to approve new banks with less than 5 million rubles in capital. That greatly simplified approval procedures as new banks no longer needed approvals from the State Council or the Tsar. However, Finance Minister Mikhail Reytern was afraid that a rapid expansion of the banking network could cause banks to fail. He prohibited the establishment of new banks in cities where one already existed and limited the number of banks to two per province. Therefore, entrepreneurs hurried to establish new banks in various regional centers. In total, eleven land banks were established in 1871–1873. Their initial combined equity was 13.5 million rubles.

== Founders and personnel ==
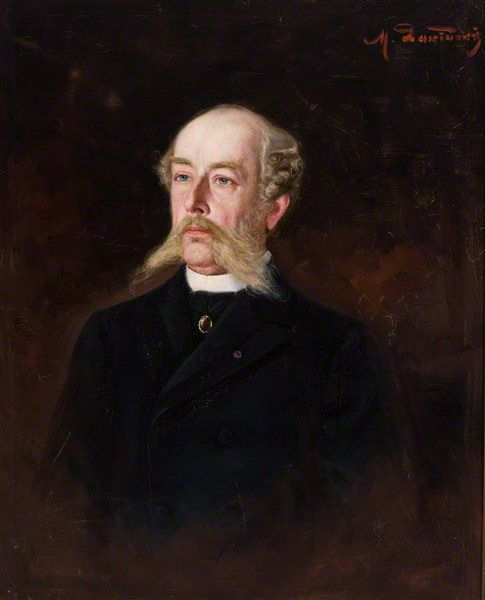
Adam Plater, one of the founding shareholders and chairmen of the board

Vilnius Land Bank was approved on 9 August 1872 and began operations in December. It was founded by the same group of people who founded the Vilnius Private Commercial Bank. It was established by the largest landowners in the former Grand Duchy of Lithuania (Peter Wittgenstein, son of Ludwig zu Sayn-Wittgenstein-Berleburg, Nikolay Zubov of Zubov family, Adam Alfred Plater), Russian nobles (Anatoly Baryatinsky, Nikolai Levashov), Russian politicians (Nicolas de Benardaky, Boris Obukhov, Colonel Vladimir Giuliani (Владимир Юрьевич Джулиани), General Pyotr Pavlovich Durnovo), bankers from Saint Petersburg (Joseph Günzburg, Leon Rosenthal, I. Gonzaga-Pavlichinsky (И. Л. Гонзаго-Павличинский)), engineer Konstantin Mikhailovsky, and others. The founders raised 1.2 million rubles in capital (down from initial plans of 1.5 million). It was allotted the territory of the Northwestern Krai and Pskov Governorate. It held monopolistic privileges in Vilnius, Kaunas, and Grodno Governorates until 1886 when St. Petersburg – Tula Land Bank was allowed to operate in these territories as well. In the Vitebsk, Minsk and Mogilev Governorates, the bank competed with the Moscow Land Bank.

In the 1870s, the largest shareholders were business people from Saint Petersburg, including Vladimir Giuliani (665 shares or 14%) and Leon Rosenthal (600 shares or 12.5%), while local nobles Zubov and Plater only had 30 shares each. The ownership later shifted with local nobles becoming the majority shareholders. In 1905, Komar family owned 403 shares, Plater family owned 714 shares, Protasewicz family owned 330. The bank was governed by a 5-member board elected for three years. The initial five members included four founders, namely Giuliani, Zubov, Wittgenstein, and Mikhailovsky. Up to 1915, about 20 people served on the board. The longest serving members of the board were Adam Alfred Plater (32 years; chairman in 1900–1908), Józef Montwiłł (27 years), Nikolay Zubov (26 years; chairman in 1872–1898), and Paweł Piotr Kończa (26 years; chairman in 1909/1910–1915). In addition to salary and dividends, board members received an annual bonus which averaged 11,881 rubles in 1892–1902. The number of employees grew from 45 in 1885 to 131 in 1915. They received annual salary increases and bonuses. Among the employees were several prominent Lithuanian politicians and activists, including Antanas Smetona, Mykolas Biržiška, and Jurgis Šaulys.

== Headquarters ==
In 1887, the bank purchased a plot of land along the St. George Avenue (present-day Gediminas Avenue). It measured 702 square Russian fathoms (one Russian fathom is about 2.1 metres (6 ft 11 in)). The bank held an architectural competition for the design of its headquarters and received 17 submissions. The chosen design by architect Vikentijus Gorskis, who was also an employee of the bank, was for a two-floor building with a basement symmetrically designed in the neoclassical and neorenaissance style. The construction started in fall 1889 and was completed by spring 1891. The interior boasted a rich decor, which was restored to its original state in 1994–1997. The building was shared with the Vilnius Private Commercial Bank, established in 1873. In 1910, the building was expanded by adding two avant-corps in the inner yard. At the same time, the building was connected with a newly built concert hall (present-day Lithuanian National Drama Theatre) and a residential building creating a complex architectural assemble. In 1928, the vestibule was reconstructed to include a revolving door and a white marble dual staircase. In the Lithuanian SSR, the building was used by the Gosbank (State Bank of the Soviet Union) and has served as the headquarters of the Bank of Lithuania since Lithuania's declaration of independence in 1990.

== Financial operations ==
=== Lending ===
New long-term loans (in thousands of rubles)
Years	Amount
1873–1877	9,908.2
1878–1882	14,593.7
1883–1892	67,554.0
1893–1902	111,211.0
1903–1909	52,042.0
Total	255,308.9

The bank offered loans to income-producing manor owners (about 70–80% of total loans) or property owners in cities. Long-term loans were paid not in cash, but in mortgage bonds which provided for a fixed annual interest to their holders. Initially, that interest was 6%. Twice a year, the borrowers had to pay the interest to mortgage bondholders plus a 1% administrative fee to the bank. This fee was lowered several times and in the 1900s it was 0.25% for manor owners and 0.5% for city residents. The loans were provided for only up to 60% of the appraised value of the mortgaged real estate. The terms of the long-term loans varied over the years. Initially, the loans for manor owners were offered for 43.5, 48.67, or 54.5 years. More terms were added later, the longest being 66.17 years. The loan terms for city residents were shorter: initially up to 27.5 years and later up to 38.33 years. Most borrowers (more than 80% in 1912–1914) opted for the longest possible loans. Short-term loans, for one to three years, were available only for up to 10% of the appraised real estate value.

The outstanding loans grew from 5 million rubles in 1874 to 148.8 million in 1912. Correspondingly, mortgaged properties grew from 148 manors (approx. 192,700 dessiatins of land) in 1874 to 12,480 manors (approx. 4,135,200 dessiatins or approx. 45,000 km^{2} (17,000 sq mi)) in 1914. Already by 1895, 15% of all privately owned land in the Russian Empire was mortgaged to land banks and Vilnius Land Bank commanded a 4% share. The average manor size dropped showing that the loans were taken out by smaller nobles and, in some cases, well-to-do peasants. The bank was very conservative in its lending practices, often using very low valuations of mortgaged properties for which it faced criticism and pressure both from the shareholders and the clients. The average loan per dessiatin increased from 12.4 rubles in 1874 to 28.6 rubles in 1913.

The default rate was low (just 0.8% or 434,000 rubles in 1890), but increased sharply during economic downturns. In the early 1890s, due to an agricultural crisis (caused by international trends as well as the Russian famine of 1891–92) and a tariff war with Germany, the default rate increased to 1.9 million rubles in 1895 and 2.9 million rubles or 3.8% in 1898. The defaults increased during the Russian Revolution of 1905 and were 4.1 million rubles in 1907. The bank offered many forms of relief to the struggling nobles, protecting local Polish landed nobility and attracting ire of Russian regulators. Russification policies called for a two-thirds land ownership by Russians and prohibited Catholic gentry and Jews from purchasing land. Therefore, there were very few land sales (as nobles could not repurchase the land later on) and auctioning foreclosed land was one of the few ways for Russians to acquire it. In 1905–1906, the bank foreclosed and sold a record 55 manors in auctions.

The share of urban borrowers kept slowly increasing to about 30% of all loans but those were riskier loans. The share of loans to merchants, who were mostly Jewish, was particularly low – just 2.2% in 1889 when the average of other banks was 13.5%. A big jump in urban loans was seen in 1892 due to the agricultural crisis (from 8 million to 13.4 million). These loans helped industrialisation, but were blamed for a construction boom which later resulted in a bust. From 1901 to 1907, the bank auctioned 659 urban properties but managed to sell only 452 and suffered 2 million rubles in losses. There were no restrictions of Catholic nobles or Jews on acquiring urban properties. In 1902, to reign in the perceived abuses, the government limited urban loans to 30% of outstanding loans. Despite the losses and regulations, the bank continued to lend to city residents and the outstanding loans amounted to 35.9 million and represented 2,891 properties in 1915.

=== Mortgage bonds ===
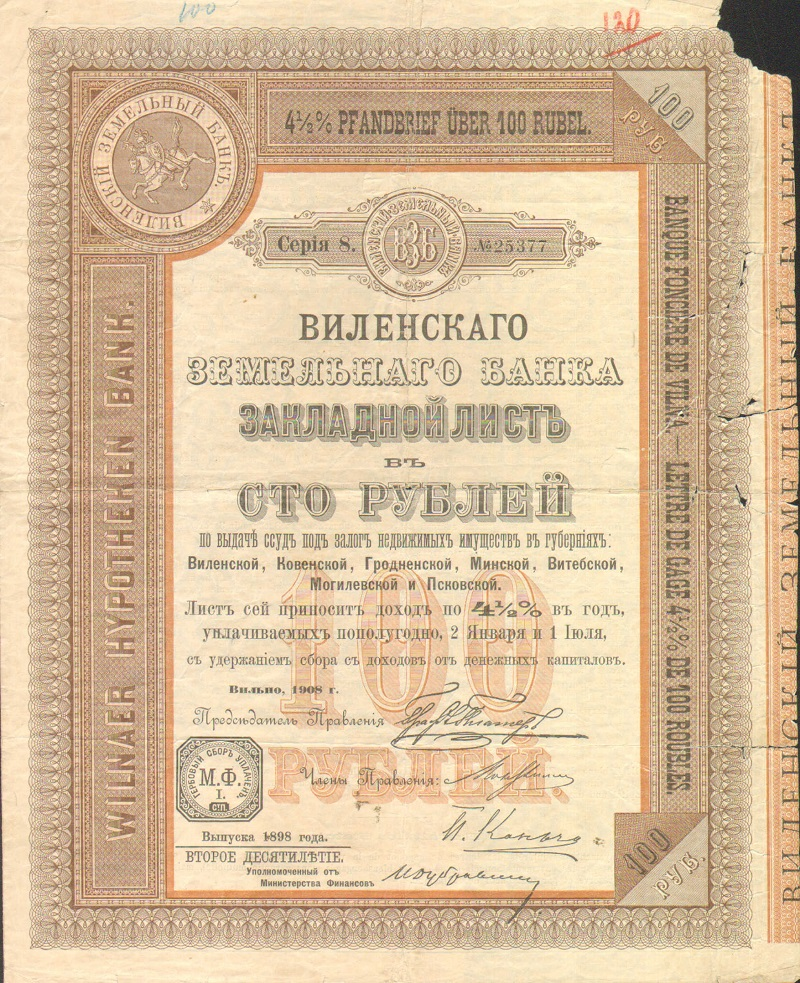
Mortgage bond issued by Vilnius Land Bank in 1908

The mortgage bonds were a way for the bank to raise funds. The bonds, nominal value 100 rubles, were sold to the public by the borrower or the bank. The bank guaranteed redemption of the bonds with its capital and the mortgaged property. A market developed for these bonds. Initially, the market price fluctuated between 81 and 93.25 rubles. Due to the Russo-Turkish War (1877–1878), the price dropped to 78 rubles. When prices rebounded and stabilized at 92–96 rubles, Russian government ordered to lower the interest rate to 5% in 1886. In 1895, the bonds traded at 99–102 rubles and the government lowered the interest to 4.5%. In 1900, among Russian land banks, only Moscow Land Bank had more outstanding mortgage bonds. During the Russian Revolution of 1905, the bond price dropped to 68 rubles. After the revolution, the market recovered and in early 1913 Vilnius Land Bank had 146.5 million rubles worth of mortgage bonds outstanding. In 1913 they traded at an average of 86 rubles.

=== Capital and reserves ===
According to banking regulations, the bank could lend not more than 10 times its capital. Therefore, as lending increased every year, new shares had to be issued almost annually. Up to 1902, the bank issued 33,700 additional shares (nominal value 250 rubles). The shares were first offered to existing shareholders who often bought majority of the new shares using their annual dividends. In 1896, Vilnius Land Bank had third largest capital among land banks after Moscow and Kharkiv banks. In 1898, Vilnius Land Bank had a profit of 1.6 million rubles, second largest after Moscow Land Bank (1.9 million). In 1912–1914, Vilnius Land Bank was the second largest, after the Bank Handlowy w Warszawie, among Polish banks in terms of capital. The annual dividend grew from 4.35% in 1873, 8% in 1874, and 14.0–14.9% in 1878–1885, to 16% in 1896–1900. The dividends dipped to 13.12% in 1904. The bank took great care to keep the dividend high and consistent, cutting bonuses for board members and even reducing bank's capital in a bad year. The capital grew to 10.6 million rubles in 1913–1914. This capital was used to provide short-term loans and any excess was required to be invested in Russian government bonds.

The bank was also required to have a reserve capital which could be used to cover losses, guarantee 8% annual dividend, or timely payment of interest on mortgage bonds in case of a borrower's default. The reserve capital had to be at least a third (later half) of its stock capital and at least a third of it had to be invested in Russian government bonds or deposited with the State Bank of the Russian Empire. Investment income from Russian government bonds and 5% of annual profit were transferred to this reserve capital. From 1883, newly issued shares were required to be sold at a premium over the nominal face value to build up the reserve. The bank achieved the required reserve level (4.8 million rubles) in 1904. From 1899, the bank had a second special reserve to cover investment losses. Due to requirements of keeping capital invested (mostly stocks of railway companies and Russian government bonds), the bank suffered significant losses (10.4 million rubles) in 1900–1905.

== After World War I ==
Vilnius Land Bank returned to its old headquarters in Vilnius, now part of the Second Polish Republic, in 1920 and continued to issue mortgages and mortgage bonds. The bond interest rates varied between 4.5%, 5%, 8% and 10%. The bonds were denominated both in Polish złoty and in U.S. dollars until the 1934 devaluation of the U.S. dollar. In the post-war years, the bank raised its capital only twice, in 1925 and 1928, but continued to keep its annual dividend high at 8% to 13%. It continued to pay the annual dividend even during the Great Depression. However, its lending volume in 1930 was only 23% of pre-war lending. In 1935, the bank organized an auction for 160 urban properties and 447 rural properties encompassing approximately 400,000 hectares (990,000 acres) of land. In 1936, it was ranked the 8th largest private bank in Poland in terms of capital (6.3 million złoty); at the time, it had total assets of 114 million złoty. Aleksander Meysztowicz was chairman of the bank for most of the interwar period (1918–1926, 1932–1939).

== See also ==
- List of banks in Lithuania
- List of banks in Poland
