= Jonas Žukas =

Lithuanian organ player and teacher

Jonas Žukas (12 November 1907 in Švėkšna, Lithuania – 8 December 2004 in Towson, Maryland) was a Lithuanian organ player and teacher. He performed for more than 50 years in Lithuania, Germany, United States, and Canada. Since 2006, an organ competition of his name is held annually in Lithuania.

Žukas was born to a family of an organist. From 1926 to 1933, he studied organs with Juozas Naujalis and fortepiano with Balys Dvarionas in Kaunas. With a stipend from the Ministry of Culture, Žukas continued his studies at the Conservatoire de Paris with Marcel Dupré and École Normale de Musique de Paris. After his return to Lithuania in 1937, he lectured at the Kaunas Conservatoire. His first public concert of works by Bach, Mendelssohn, Franck, and Widor was held on November 28, 1937. After St. Michael the Archangel Church acquired modern organs, Žukas held a series of concerts.

In 1944, he retreated to Germany, where he played at various churches and studied composition with Wolfgang Fortner. In 1949, he emigrated to the United States and settled in Woodhaven, Queens. His first show in the U.S. was held in 1950 at the Annunciation Church in Brooklyn. Later he performed in a variety of venues, including The Town Hall and Carnegie Hall in New York, Cathedral of Mary Our Queen in Baltimore. In 1984, on the 500th anniversary of Saint Casimir, he performed at the Cathedral Basilica of Saints Peter and Paul, Philadelphia. In 1987, his concert for the 600th anniversary of the Christianization of Lithuania from Immaculate Conception Church in Washington DC was broadcast by Voice of America to Lithuania.
