= Burbiškis =

- Village
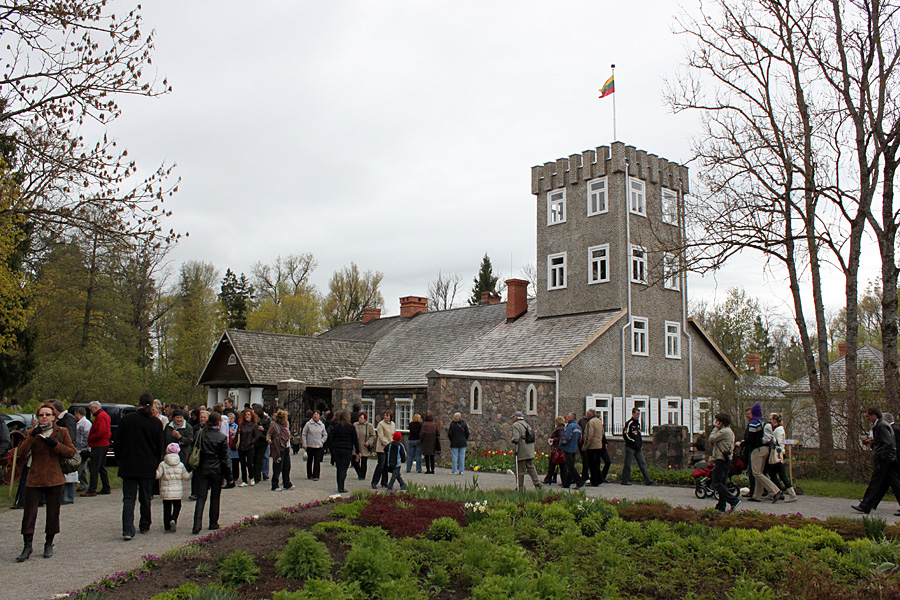
- Burbiškis Manor

- Location of Burbiškis
- Coordinates: 55°47′N 23°53′E
- Country: Lithuania
- Ethnographic region: Samogitia
- County: Šiauliai County
- Municipality: Radviliškis district municipality
- Eldership: Pakalniškiai eldership

Population (2001)
  - Total: 7
- Time zone: UTC+2 (EET)
  - Summer (DST): UTC+3 (EEST)

Burbiškis is a small village in northern Lithuania, between Šiauliai and Panevėžys. According to census of 2001, it had 7 residents.

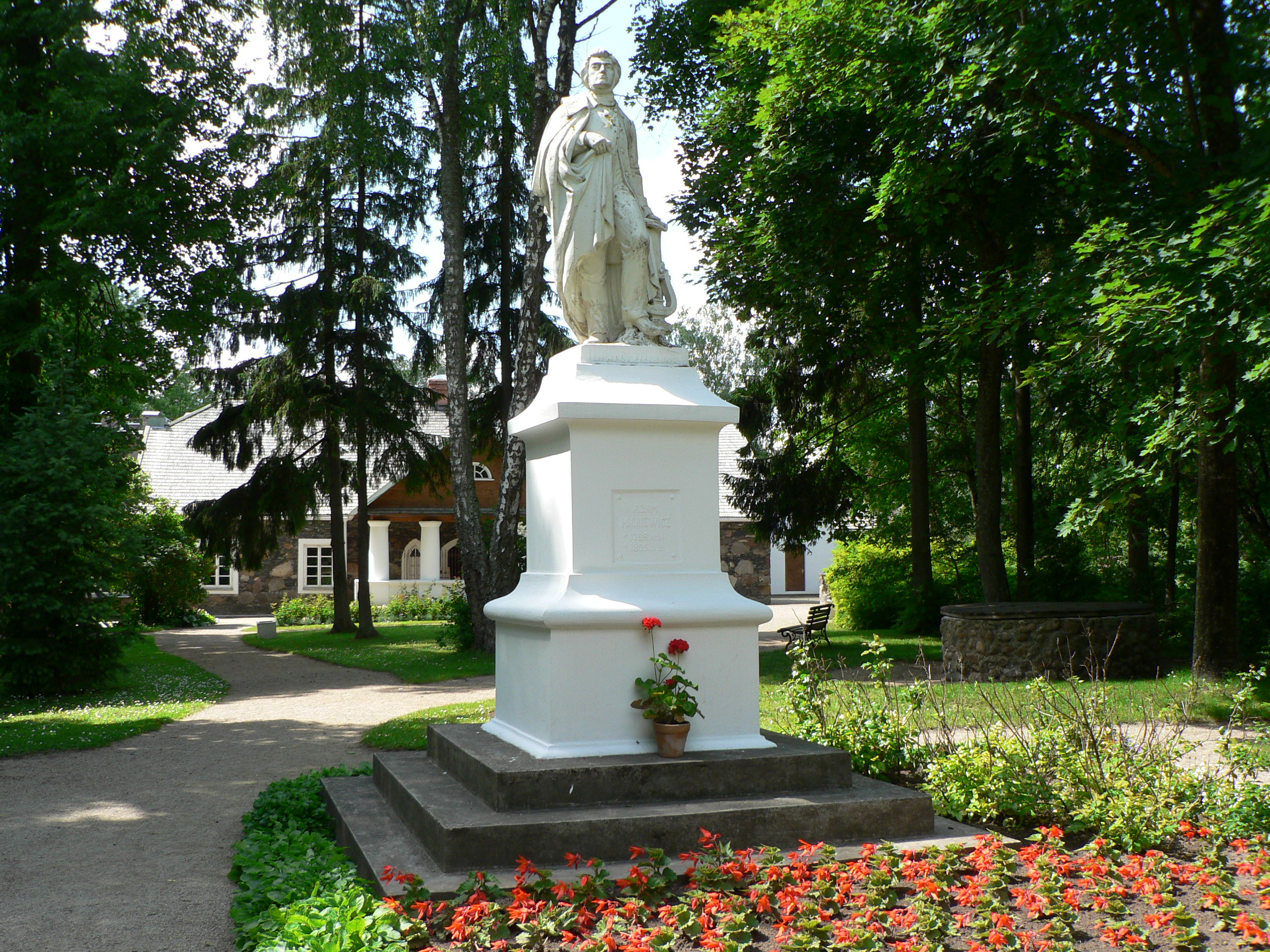
Monument to Adam Mickiewicz

Burbiškis features a Neo-Gothic manor house, first mentioned in 1618. The first owners, the Burba family, gave the village its name. From 1819 to 1941, the manor belonged to the Bażeński family. Michał Ignacy Bażeński's son Michał was married to Marija, poet and daughter of cultural activist Petras Vileišis. Kornel Makuszyński, a renowned Polish writer of children's and youth literature, was married to Emilia Bażeńska, daughter of Michał Ignacy. The couple lived in Burbiškis in 1912–14.Therefore, in the early 20th century, Burbiškis was one of the places for cultural meetings of intelligentsia.

The manor is quite well preserved with some original interior. The manor houses a small museum and a guesthouse. The buildings are surrounded by a 28-hectare (69-acre) park with man-made lakes that feature 15 islands connected by 12 bridges. The park also has monuments to Romantic poet Adam Mickiewicz (erected in 1911), medieval ruler Vytautas the Great (1912), Saint Mary. Every spring the park hosts a festival showcasing some 400 different varieties of tulips.
