= Švėkšna Eldership =

Eldership of Lithuania

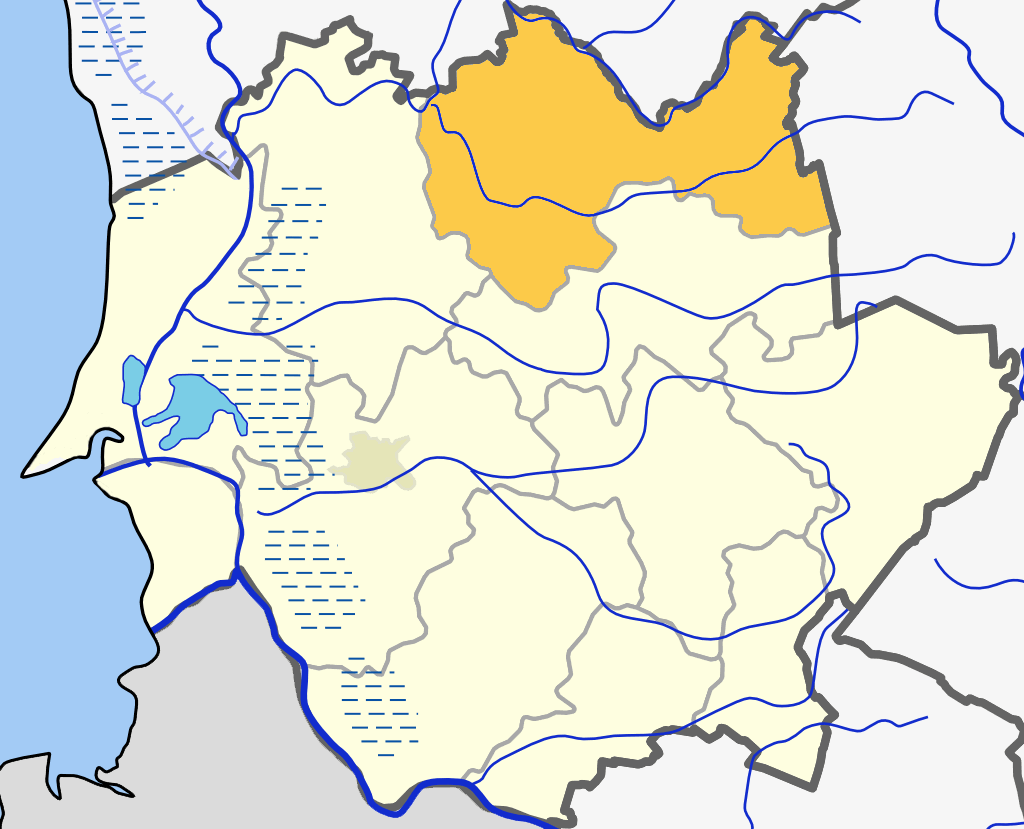
Švėkšnsko eldership, Šilutė district

The Švėkšna Eldership (Lithuanian: Švėkšnos seniūnija) is an eldership of Lithuania, located in the Šilutė District Municipality. In 2021 its population was 2690.
