= Adam Alfred Plater =

Polish-Lithuanian noble

Adam Alfred Gustaw Count Broel-Plater
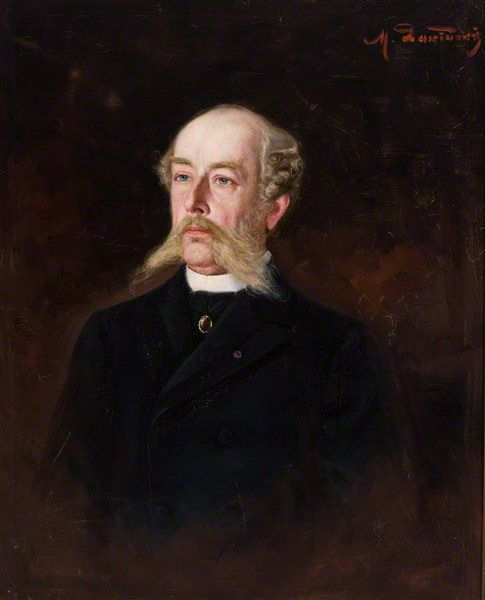
- Portrait of Adam Plater
- Born: 23 April 1836; Vilnius, Russian Empire
- Died: 24 December 1909 (aged 73); Švėkšna, Russian Empire
- Occupations: Archaeologist, public figure

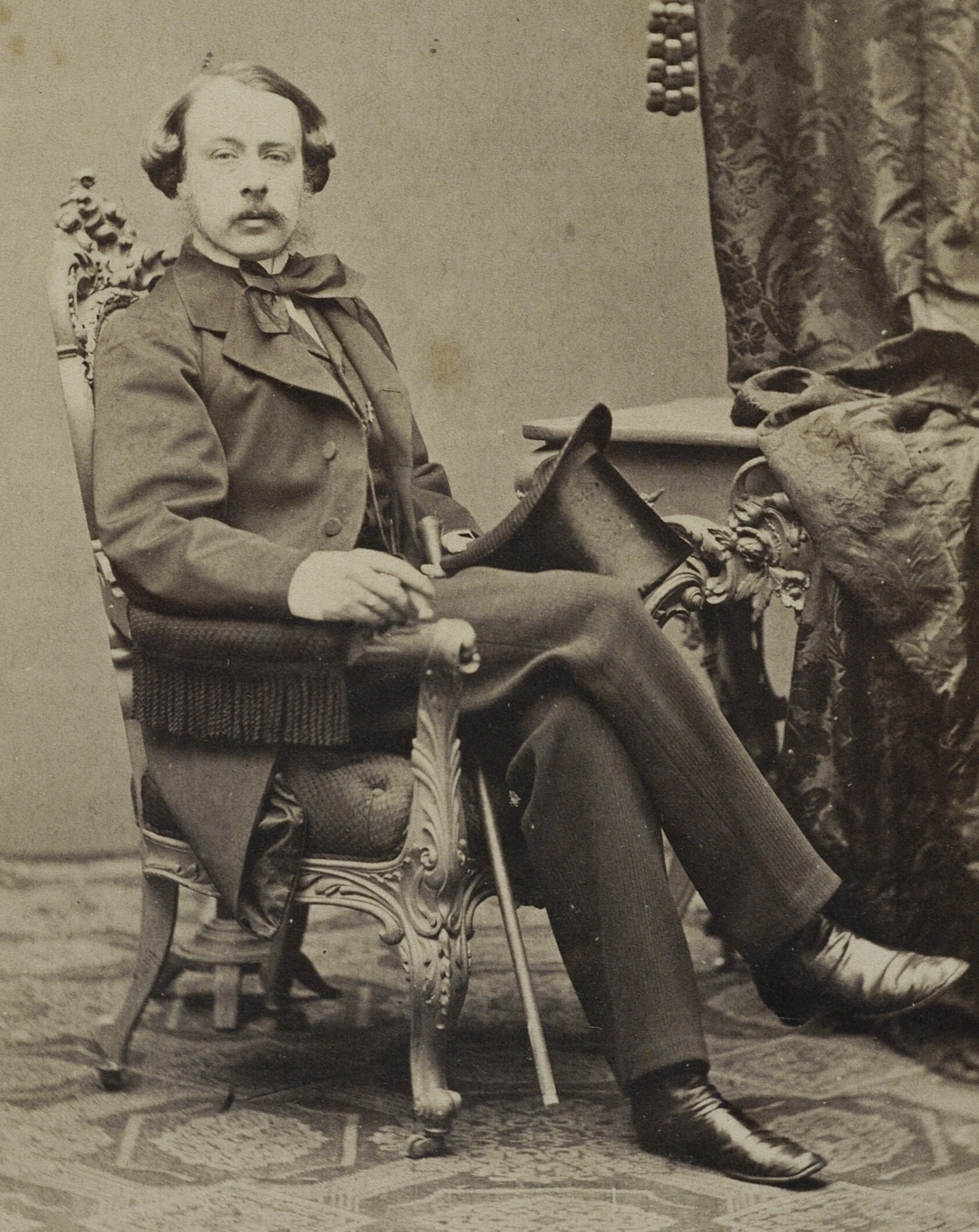
Adam Plater in the 1860s

Adam Alfred Gustaw Count Broel-Plater (23 April 1836 – 24 December 1909) was a Polish-Lithuanian noble known as collector and archaeologist. He was also a marshal of nobility of the Vilna Governorate.

== Biography ==
Adam Alfred Plater was born into the noble Plater family. He inherited the Švėkšna estate from his parents. Later, thanks to his influence at court, despite being Polish, he obtained the right to acquire estates in the Northwestern Krai. He acquired the Vepriai estate with the town and manors of Kowalaki and Bataniszki in the Ukmergė County. Plater sponsored construction of both Roman Catholic and Evangelical Lutheran churches in Švėkšna.

After completing his education, he travelled around Western Europe as well as Greece and the Middle East. He became interested in archaeology from an early age. At age 15, he began excavating ancient graves near his family's estate in Švėkšna. In one of the tumulus he discovered seven Egyptian amulets which modern archaeologists cannot explain and suggest that they were brought by the Plater family from Egypt. He also excavated 72 tumuli near Rokantiškės (suburb of Vilnius) and researched tumuli and hillforts in Kernavė. He started collecting souvenirs and monuments connected with the pagan period of the Lithuania and Polish history. He gathered a rich library of Polish old prints and a collection of numismatics. In 1860, he was invited to the Vilnius Archaeological Commission and later to the St. Petersburg Archaeological Society.

In 1857 he took up the post of honorary superintendent of the Švenčionys Gymnasium. In 1861, he became the marshal of the Raseiniai County. He took positions loyal to the Russian government and fought the influence of the "whites" in the region. Nevertheless, after the outbreak of the January Uprising, he accepted the nomination for the insurgent chief of the district. After the collapse of the uprising, having a choice of death, he allegedly agreed to become marshal of the Vilna county. In August 1863, together with his father, he was one of the first landowners to sign a pledge of allegiance to the Tsar in Vilnius. Nevertheless, Plater supported the Lithuanian National Revival and is rumored to have smuggled the prohibited Lithuanian press.

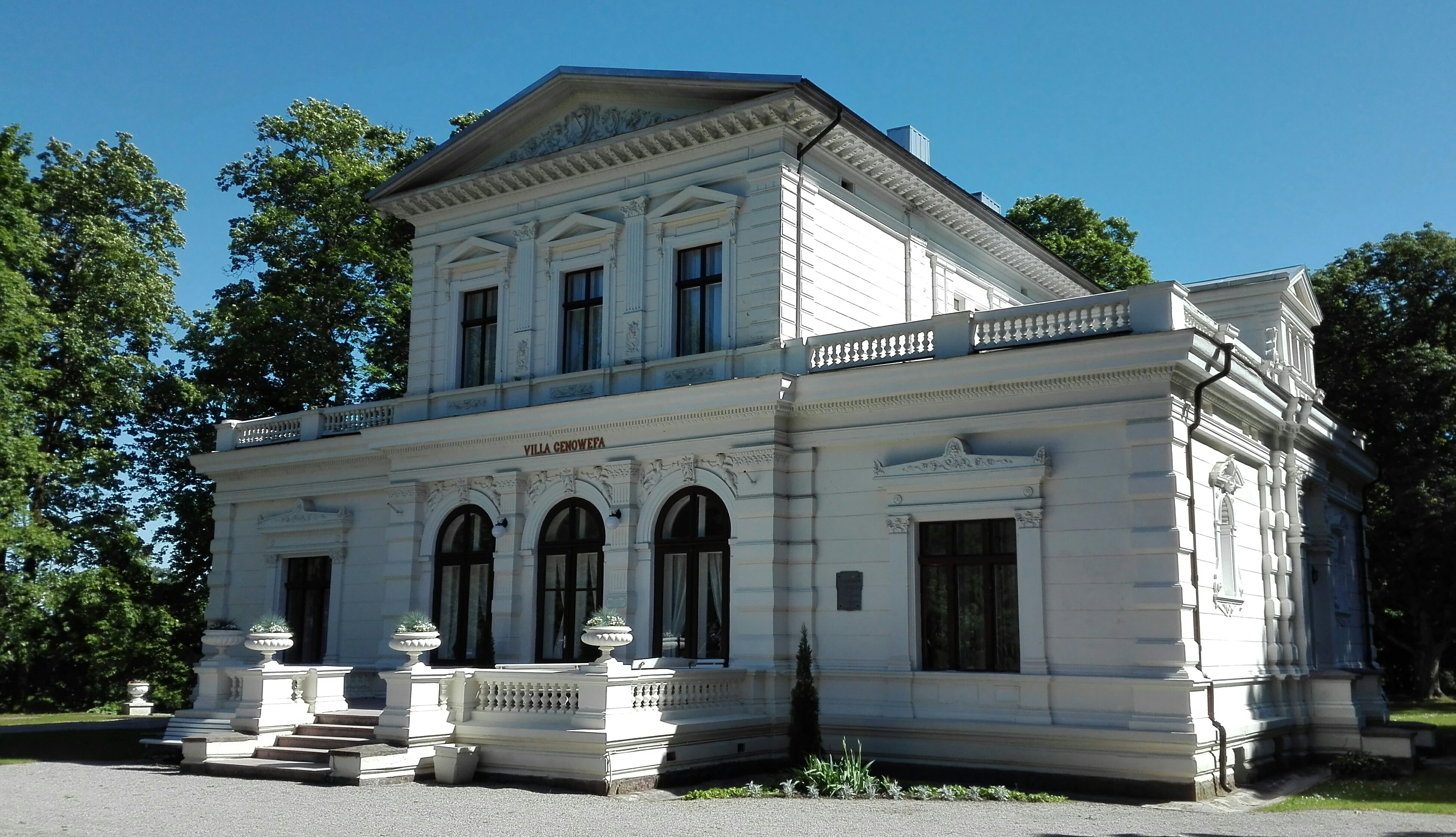
Plater's manor in Švėkšna

On 29 January 1864, he became a marshal of Vilna County, then in 1878 of Vilna Governorate. In 1888 he became the Russian Stallmeister, in 1903 the Hofmeister, and finally an Active Privy Councillor. He received various Russian orders: Saint Vladimir 2nd class (1894), White Eagle (1896) and Saint Alexander Nevsky (1900). He was the only Pole present at the unveiling of the monument to Mikhail Muravyov in Vilnius in 1898.

In 1872, he became one of the founders of the Vilnius Land Bank and served on its board for 32 years, including as chairman in 1900–1908. On 21 October 1878, he became president of the Vilnius Charity Society. He also served as chairman of the committee for the reconstruction of St. Anne's Church in Vilnius.

He died on 24 December 1909 in Švėkšna. He is buried in a crypt under the main altar of the Švėkšna church. He donated his numismatic collection to the Potocki family from Krzeszowice and his archaeological collection (about 450 items) to the Museum of the Society of Friends of Science in Wilno.

== Family ==
He was the son of Stefan Emeryk Plater and Alojza Alina Żaba-Marcinikiewicz. In 1872, in the Holy Cross Church in Warsaw, he married Genowefa Pusłowska, daughter of Wandalin Pusłowski and Jadwiga Gołąbek-Jezierska. She had two sons with her: Marian Stefan Wandalin (1873–1951) and Jerzy Floryan Felicjan (1875–1943).

== Sources ==
- Kieniewicz, Stefan (1981). "Adam Alfred Gustaw Plater". Polski Słownik Biograficzny (in Polish). Vol. 26. Wrocław. p. 646.
- Wilczyński, Jan Kazimierz (1858–1866). Rodowód hrabiów z Broël Platerów (in Polish). Paris.
