= Burbiškis Manor (Anykščiai) =

Coordinates: 55°30′5″N 25°13′0″E

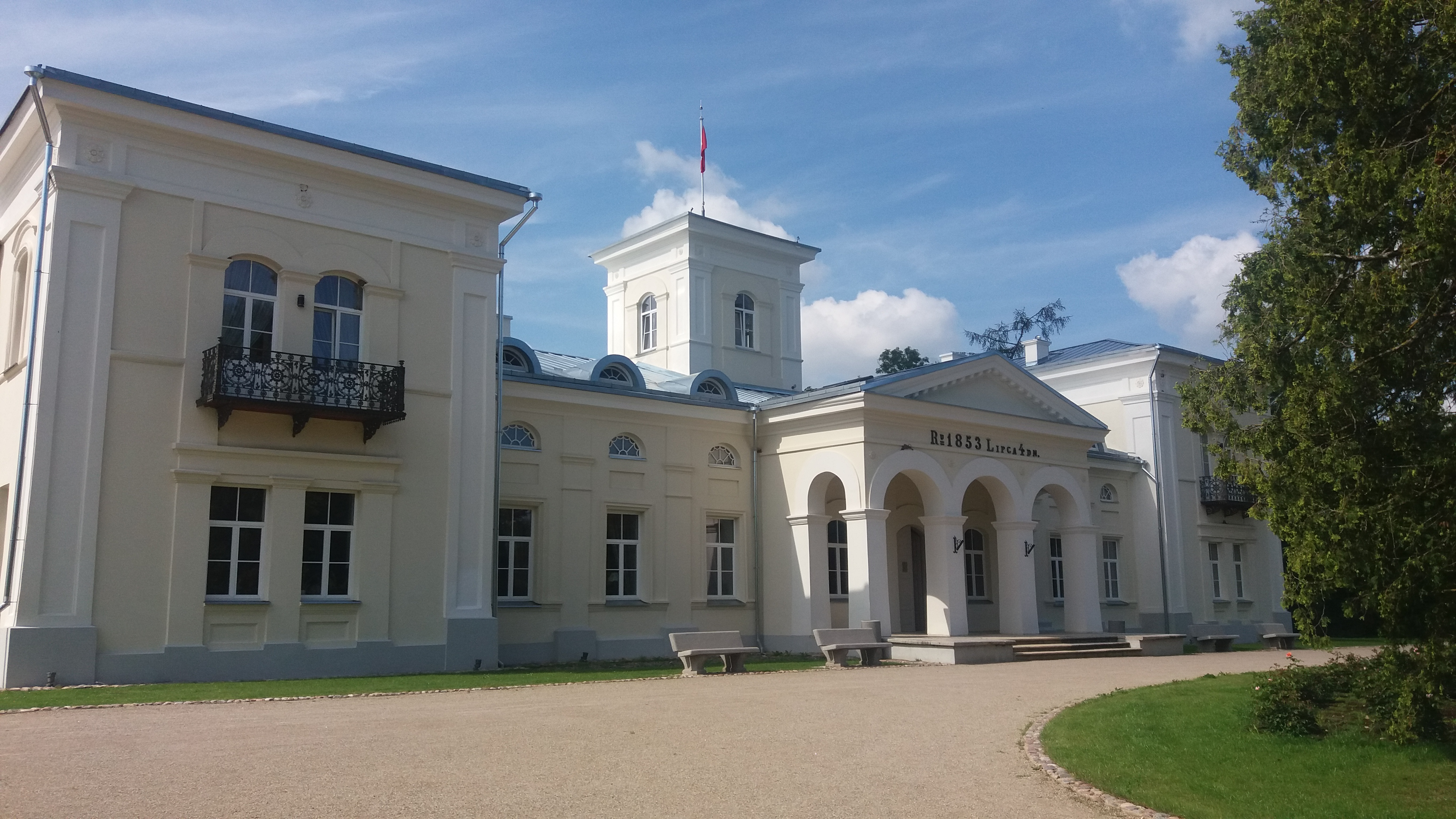
- Burbiškis Manor after the reconstruction (2016)
- Interactive map of the Burbiškis Manor area

General information
- Type: Residential manor
- Location: Burbiškis, Lithuania
- Construction started: 1853
- Construction stopped: 1857
- Renovated: 4 March 2015

Burbiškis Manor is a former residential manor and park in Burbiškis, Anykščiai District Municipality, near the Anykšta river, built in 1853–1857. On 4 March 2015 the manor was opened after the reconstruction.
