= Gardamas =

- Town
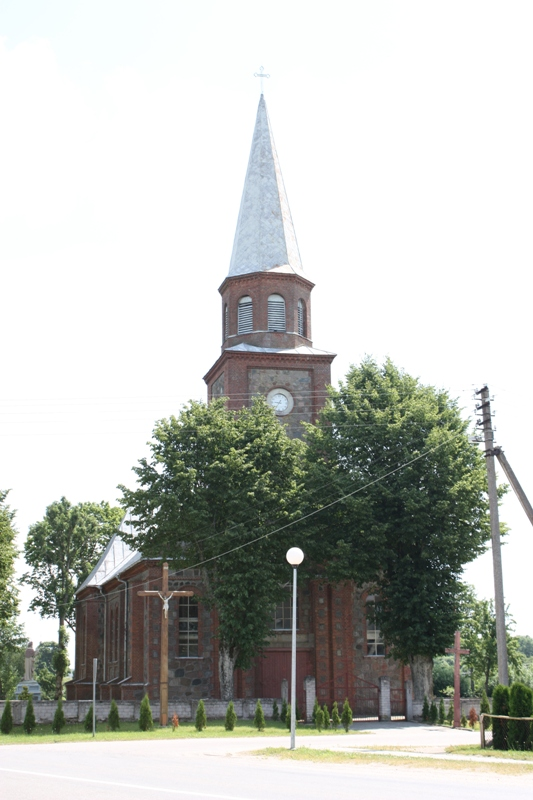

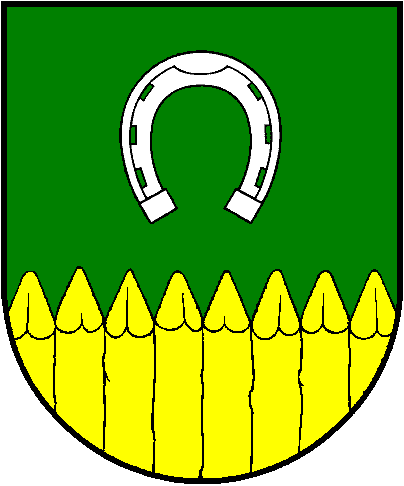
- Seal

- Location within Lithuania
- Coordinates: 55°24′30″N 21°39′40″E
- Country: Lithuania
- County: Klaipėda County

Population (2011)
  - Total: 398
- Time zone: UTC+2 (EET)
  - Summer (DST): UTC+3 (EEST)

Gardamas is a small town in Klaipėda County, in northwestern Lithuania. According to the 2011 census, the town has a population of 398 people.

== History ==
In 1304 Gardamas was destroyed by the Teutonic Order. In 1561, Gardamas was mentioned a village, by the parish in Valaki . Gardamas appeared in 1679 on the Prussia map. In 1706, Kvėdarna Paco Gardamo built the first church in Gardamas.
