= Švėkšna =

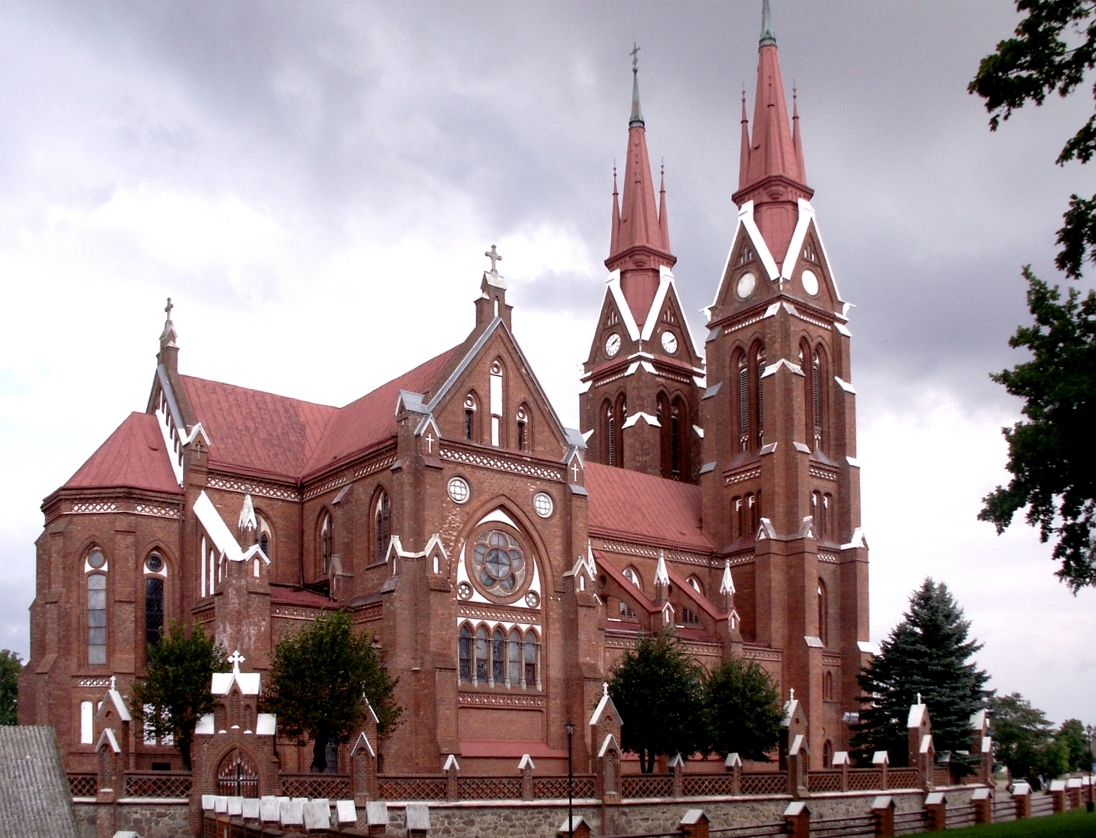

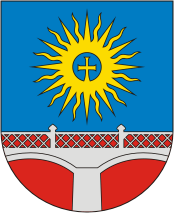
- Coat of arms

- Location within Lithuania
- Coordinates: 55°31′0″N 21°37′40″E
- Country: Lithuania
- County: Klaipėda County
- Municipality: Šilutė district municipality
- Elderate: Švėkšna elderate
- Capital of: Švėkšna Eldership
- Established: disputed

Population (2021)
  - Total: 1,334
- Time zone: UTC+2 (EET)
  - Summer (DST): UTC+3 (EEST)

Švėkšna is a town in the Šilutė District municipality, 21 km northeast of Šilutė, Lithuania. It is the administrative center of Švėkšna Eldership. There are 29 streets in the town. In the western part of the town flows the river Švėkšnalė.

There is a mental hospital in the town, as well as a health care centre, pharmacy, "Saulės" secondary school, affiliates of music and art schools of Šilutė, kindergarten, recreation center, library, museum, 2 churches, the renovated synagogue, the parish's nursing home, the planning department, a post office, police station and fire house.

== History ==
Švėkšna has been mentioned since the 14th century. Supposedly, the settlement could have been established after the Treaty of Melno in 1422, when the danger of the Teutonic Knights had declined. On March 8, 1503, Švėkšna was mentioned in the act of Linkuva church's foundation and subsidy. In 1509, Švėkšna belonged to Stanislovas Kęsgaila, the Elder of Samogitia.

In 19th century Švėkšna was a property of Plater family. At the time a bridge connecting church and manor was built. At the end of 19th century during Lithuanian press ban it was one of major centre's for distributing Lithuanian literature in Latin print.

In 1941, at least 20 Jews were murdered in a mass execution by an Einsatzgruppe. The execution was carried out by order of SS-Sturmbannführer Hans Joachim Böhme, commander of Gestapo Tilsit. The murder site is in the old Jewish cemetery on the outskirts of the town on Aušros street, there is a monument at the location.

On January 18, 2000, the coat of arms of Švėkšna were granted by the presidential decree.

== Notable people ==
- Jonas Žukas (1907–2004), Lithuanian organ player and teacher
