= Noriūnai =

- Village
- Location within Lithuania
- Coordinates: 55.805°N 24.896°E
- Country: Lithuania
- County: Panevėžys County

Population
  - Total: 928
- Time zone: Eastern European Time (UTC+2)
  - Summer (DST): Eastern European Summer Time (UTC+3)

Noriūnai is a village in Kupiškis District Municipality, Panevėžys County, Lithuania. The population was 928 in 2011.

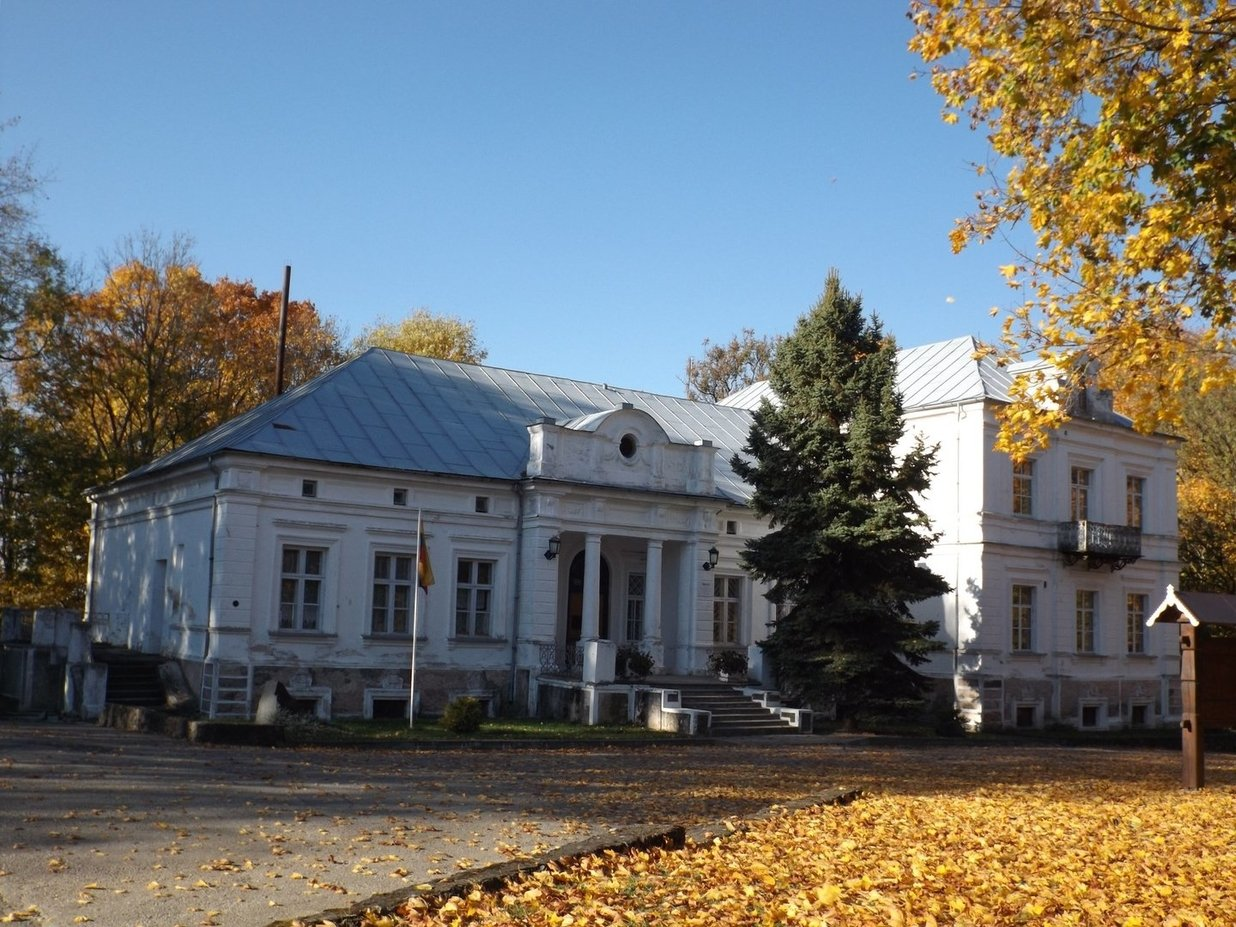
Noriūnai Manor

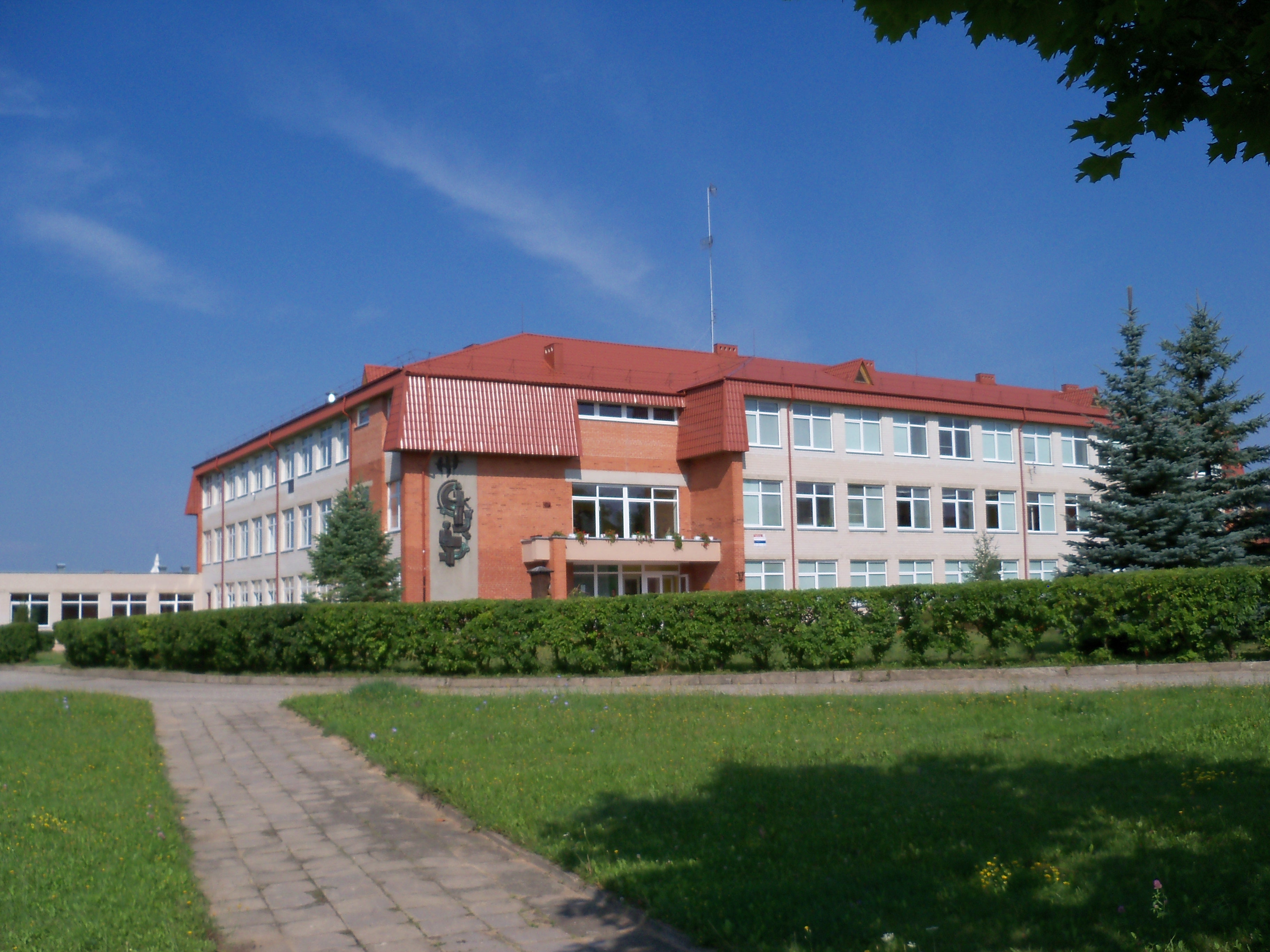
Noriūnai School

== See also ==
Noriūnai Manor
