= Noriūnai Manor =

Coordinates: 55°48′00″N 24°53′19″E

Noriūnai Manor is a former residential manor in Noriūnai village, Kupiškis district in Lithuania. The Manor complex was started in 1665 and consists of the main building, farm laborers outbuildings and park.

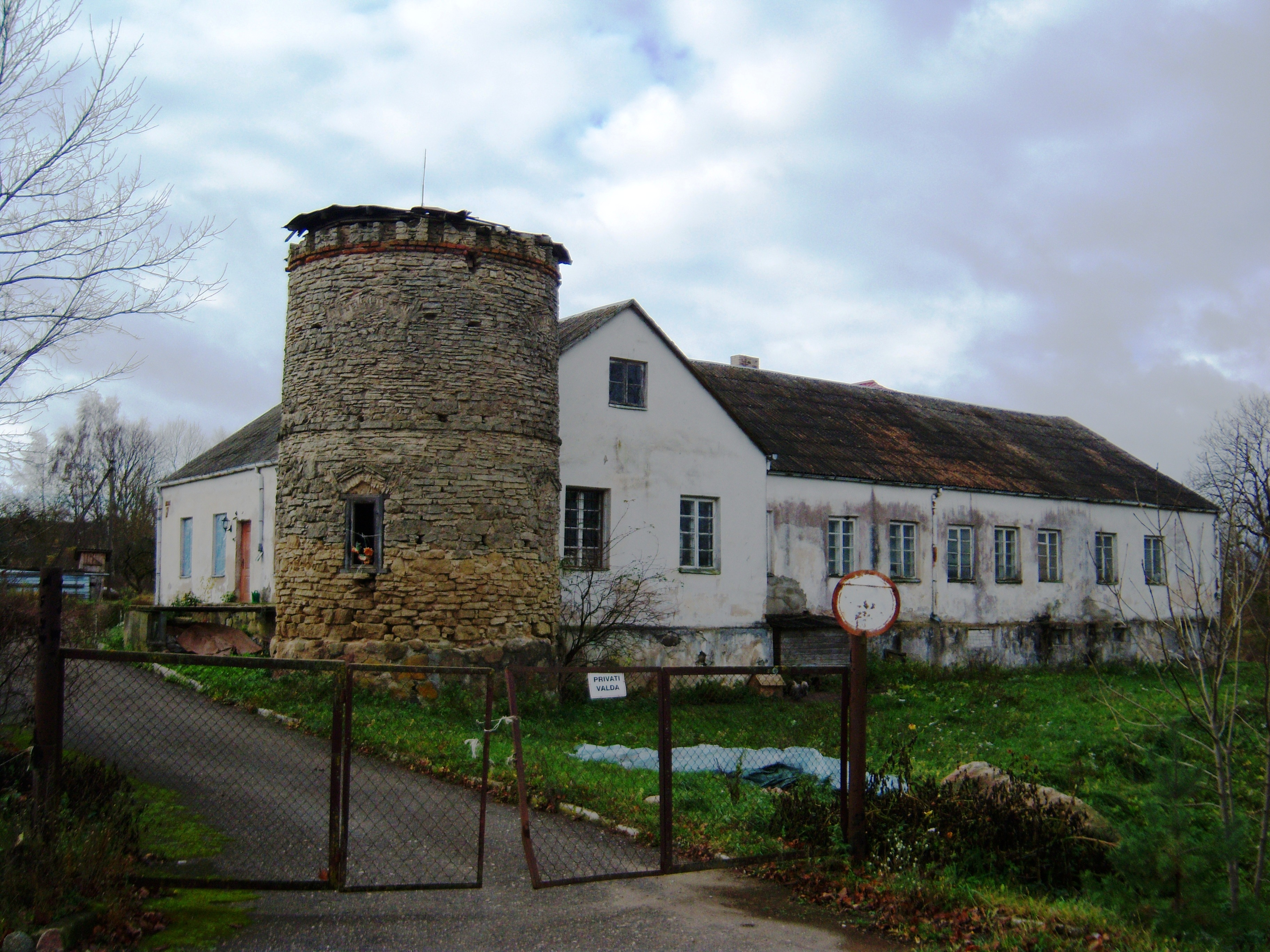
